= Health in Bangladesh =

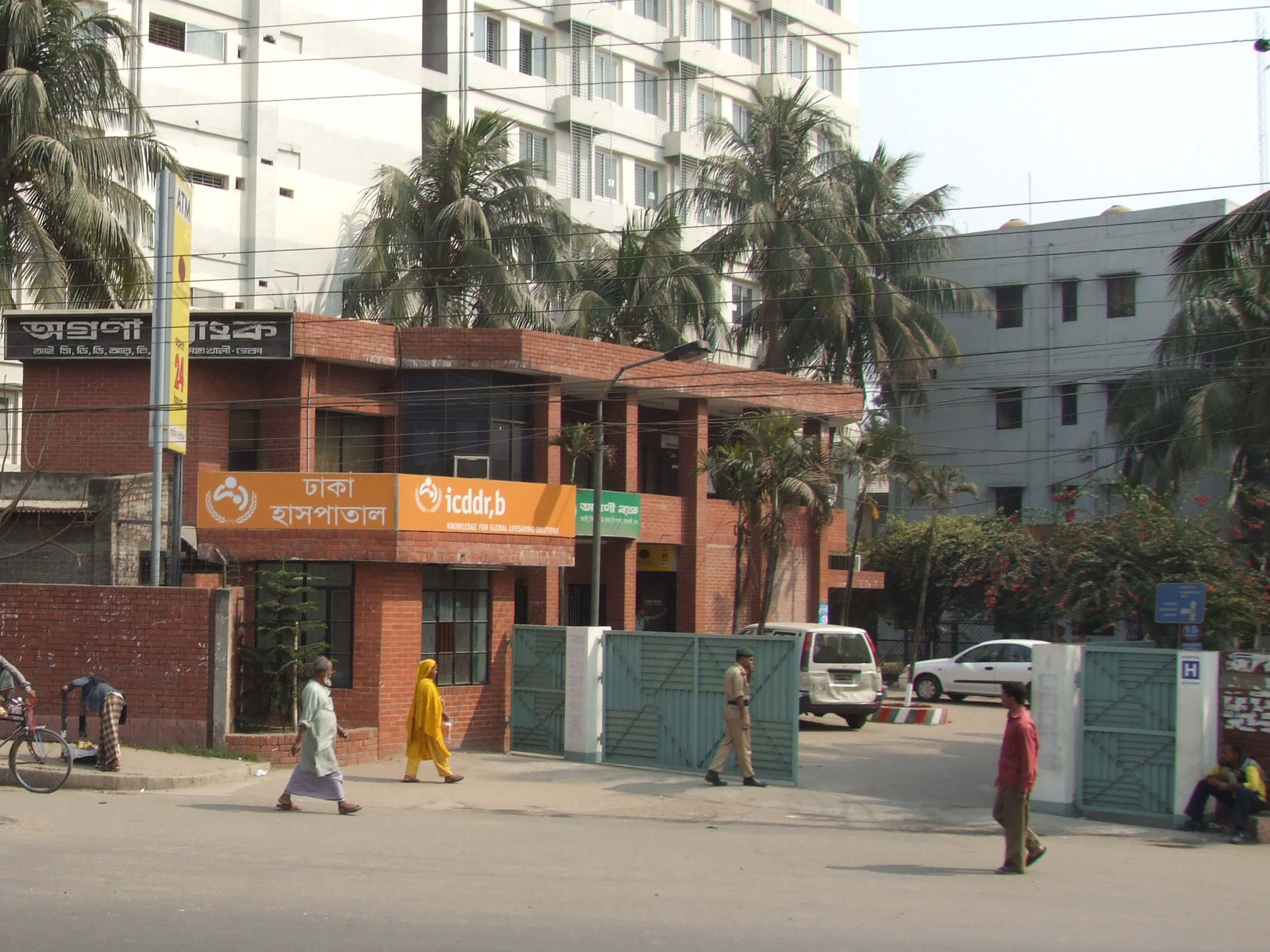
International Centre for Diarrhoeal Disease Research Office, Bangladesh

Bangladesh is one of the most populous countries in the world, as well as having one of the fastest growing economies in the world. Consequently, Bangladesh faces challenges and opportunities in regard to public health. A remarkable metamorphosis has unfolded in Bangladesh, encompassing the demographic, health, and nutritional dimensions of its populace.

The Human Rights Measurement Initiative finds that Bangladesh is fulfilling 89.3% of what it should be fulfilling for the right to health based on its level of income. When looking at the right to health with respect to children, Bangladesh achieves 95.0% of what is expected based on its current income. In regard to the right to health amongst the adult population, the country achieves only 94.2% of what is expected based on the nation's level of income. Bangladesh falls into the "bad" category when evaluating the right to reproductive health because the nation is fulfilling only 78.8% of what the nation is expected to achieve based on the resources (income) it has available.

== Health infrastructure ==
To ensure equitable healthcare for every resident in Bangladesh, an network of health services has been established. The infrastructure of healthcare facilities can be divided into three levels: medical universities, medical college hospitals, and specialty hospitals exist at the tertiary level. District hospitals and maternal and child welfare centers are considered to be on the secondary level. Upazila health complexes, union health & family welfare centers, and community clinics (lowest-level healthcare facilities) are the primary-level healthcare providers. Various NGOs and private institutions also contribute to this network.

The total expenditure on healthcare as a percentage of Bangladesh's GDP was 2.48% in 2019.

In the parliamentary budget of 2017–18, the budget that was set for the health sector was 16 thousand 203 crore 36 lakhs taka.

There are 3 hospital beds per 10,000 people. The general government expenditure on healthcare as a percentage of total government expenditure was 7.9% as of 2009. Citizens pay most of their health care bills as out-of-pocket expenditures as a percentage of private expenditure on health: 96.5%. The doctor-to-population ratio is 1:2,000, and the nurse-to-population ratio is 1:5,000.

=== Hospitals ===
Hospitals in Bangladesh play a vital role in the country's healthcare system, providing essential medical services to the population. With a growing emphasis on improving healthcare infrastructure, Bangladesh has made significant progress in expanding access to hospital facilities across the country. According to the World Health Organization (WHO), as of 2021, there were approximately 5,146 hospitals in Bangladesh, including both public and private institutions. These hospitals offer a wide range of medical specialties and services, ranging from general healthcare to specialized treatments. The government has also implemented various initiatives to enhance hospital quality and promote patient safety. The availability of hospitals has contributed to improving healthcare outcomes and addressing the healthcare needs of the Bangladeshi population.

== Health status ==
Life expectancy development in Bangladesh

=== Demographics ===
- Population – 171. million
- Rural population – 70%
- Population density – (population/km2) 1,070/sqkm
- People below poverty line – 60%
- Population doubling rate – 25–30 years
- GDP (current US$)(billions) – 300

=== Health indicators ===
- CDR – 5.35 /1000
- Maternal mortality ratio – 176 /100000
- IMR – 31 /1000 live births
- Under 5 MR – 38 /1000 live births
- Total fertility rate – 2.1
- Life expectancy at birth – 71 (m) and 73 (f)
- Fully immunized children – 52%

== Health problems in Bangladesh ==
Due to a large population, Bangladesh faces a large burden of disease:

- Non-communicable diseases: diabetes, cardiovascular disease, hypertension, stroke, chronic respiratory disease, cancer
- Communicable diseases: tuberculosis, HIV, tetanus, malaria, measles, rubella, leprosy

Malnutrition and environmental sanitation problems add to this burden.

=== Communicable disease ===
Historically, communicable diseases formed the bulk of total diseases in developing and tropical countries such as Bangladesh. By 2015, via Millennium Development Goals, where communicable diseases were targeted, Bangladesh attained almost significant control over communicable diseases. An expanded immunization program against nine major diseases (TB, tetanus, diphtheria, whooping cough, polio, hepatitis B, Haemophilus influenza type B, measles, and rubella) was undertaken for implementation.

==== Tuberculosis ====
Background: Tuberculosis is one of the most dangerous chronic infectious diseases in Bangladesh. It is the major public health problem in this country. Mycobacterium tuberculosis is a common responsible organism of tuberculosis. It is an airborne disease that spreads through the coughing of an infected person. This disease is more prone to slum dwellers living in unhygienic conditions. Tuberculosis mainly infects the lungs (pulmonary tuberculosis) with the symptoms of persistent cough, evening fever with sweating, chest pain, weakness, weight loss, hemoptysis, etc. But it can also infect the other parts of the body (extrapulmonary tuberculosis) like the brain, kidneys, and bones. In most cases patients infected with tuberculosis have other concomitant infections. HIV is more common to them.

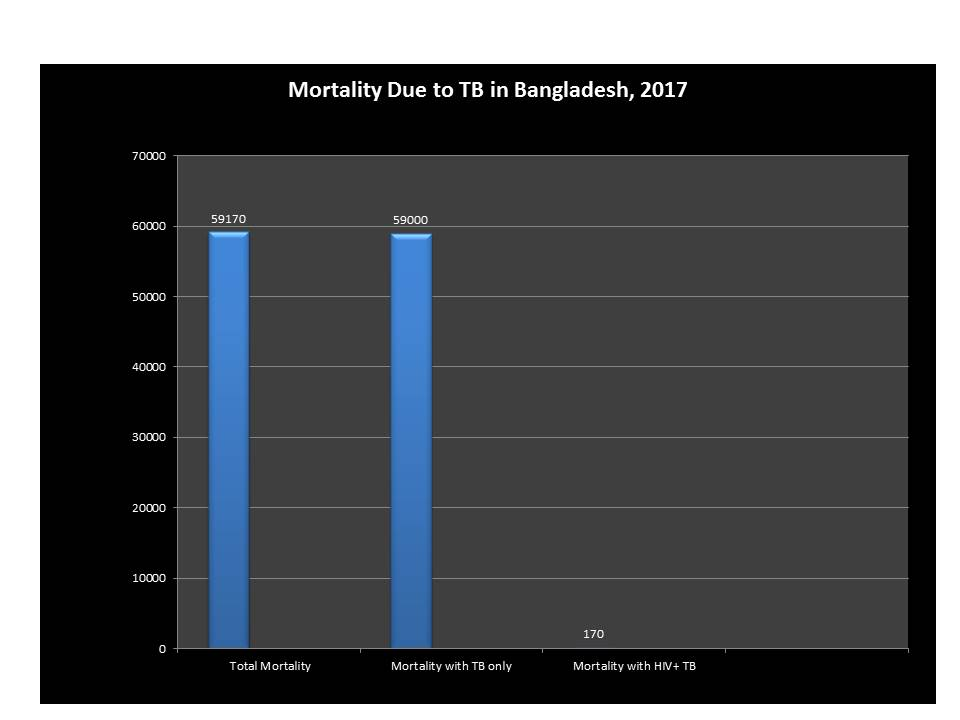
Total mortality due to TB in Bangladesh, 2017

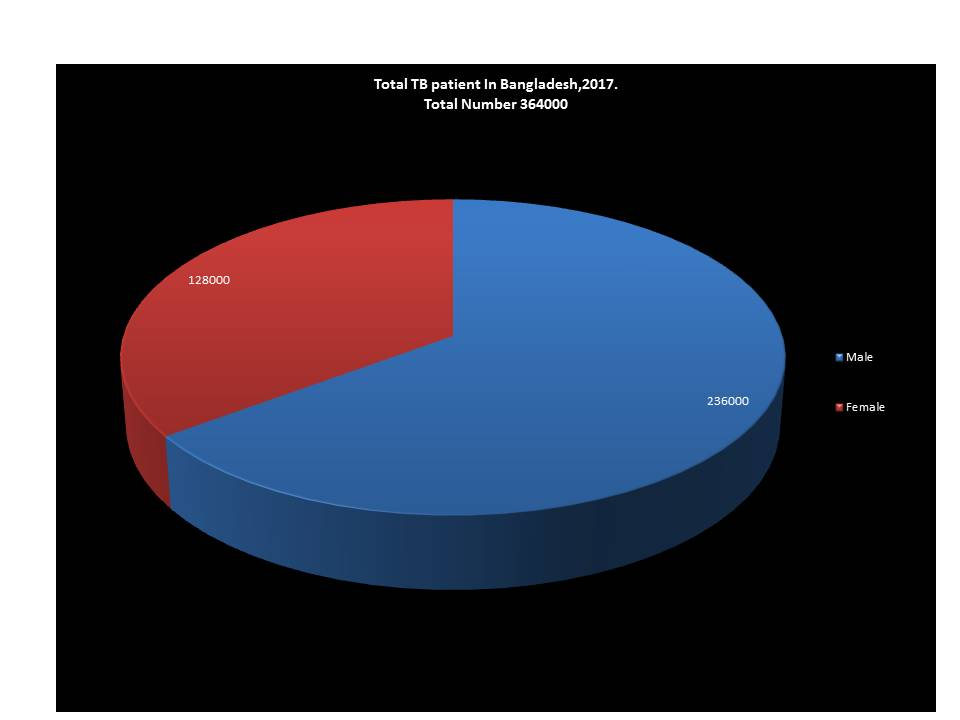
Total TB patients in Bangladesh, 2017

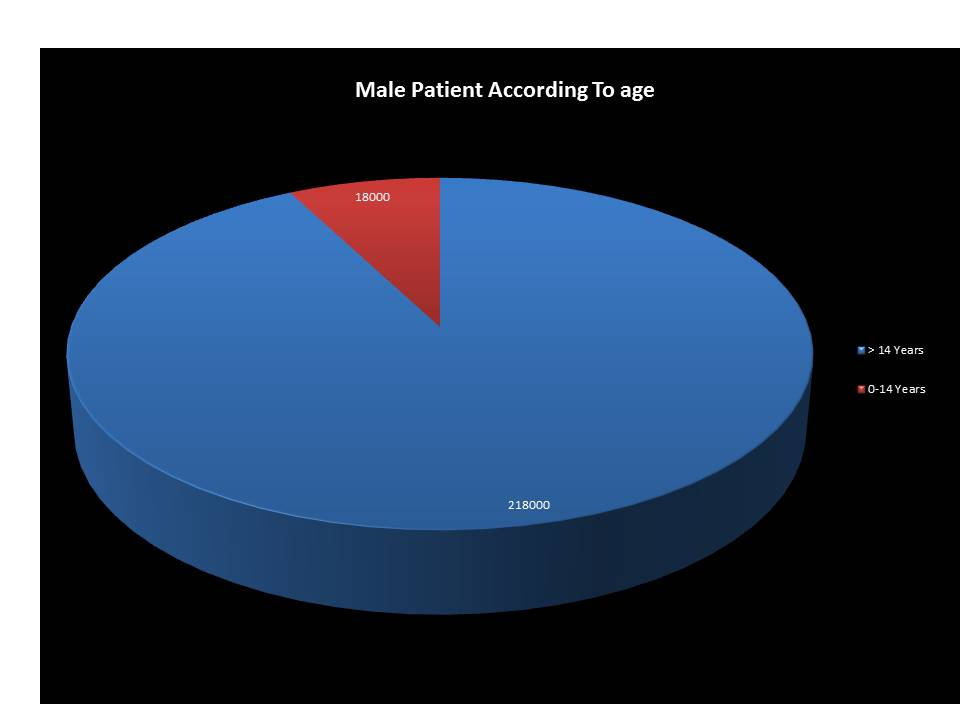
Male patient number according to age

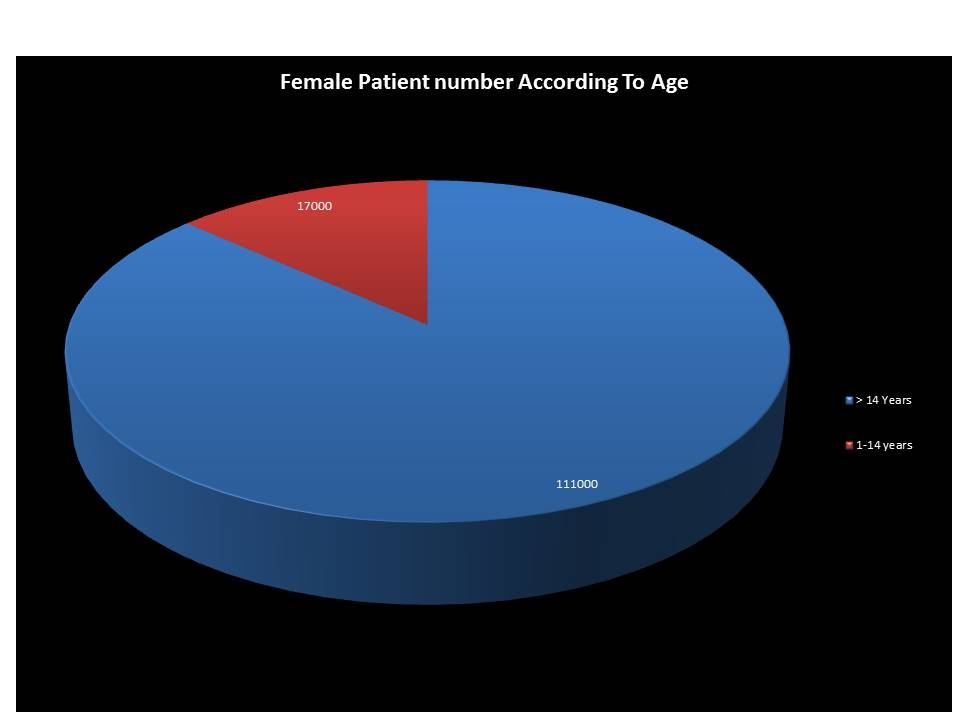
Female patient number according to age

Present TB status of Bangladesh: According to the WHO's 'Global TB Report 2017', the total population was 165 million, Bangladesh is one of the world's 30 high TB burden countries, and about 59,170 people died due to tuberculosis. The total estimated number of TB patients was 364,000, among them male patients were recorded at 236,000, and female patients was 128,000. In 2017 the total case was notified 244,201. The total new and relapse case was 242,639. People are mainly suffering from pulmonary TB; it was 81% (197,800 patients) of notified cases. Still now, HIV is considered as the most deadly infectious disease all over the world. It suppresses the immune system of the body. So any kind of infection can be incubated into the body, HIV infected person can be easily infected by mycobacterium tuberculosis.

TB with HIV patient: Still now, HIV is considered as the most deadly infectious disease all over the world. It suppresses the immune system of the body. So any kind of infection can be incubated into the body, HIV infected person can be easily infected by mycobacterium tuberculosis, it is HIV-TB co infection. In 2017, the estimated number of the patient with HIV positive status tuberculosis was 540. Patient with HIV positive status (new and relapse case) notified was 89, out of 540 HIV positive patients. Among 89 patient 84 patients took anti-retroviral therapy.

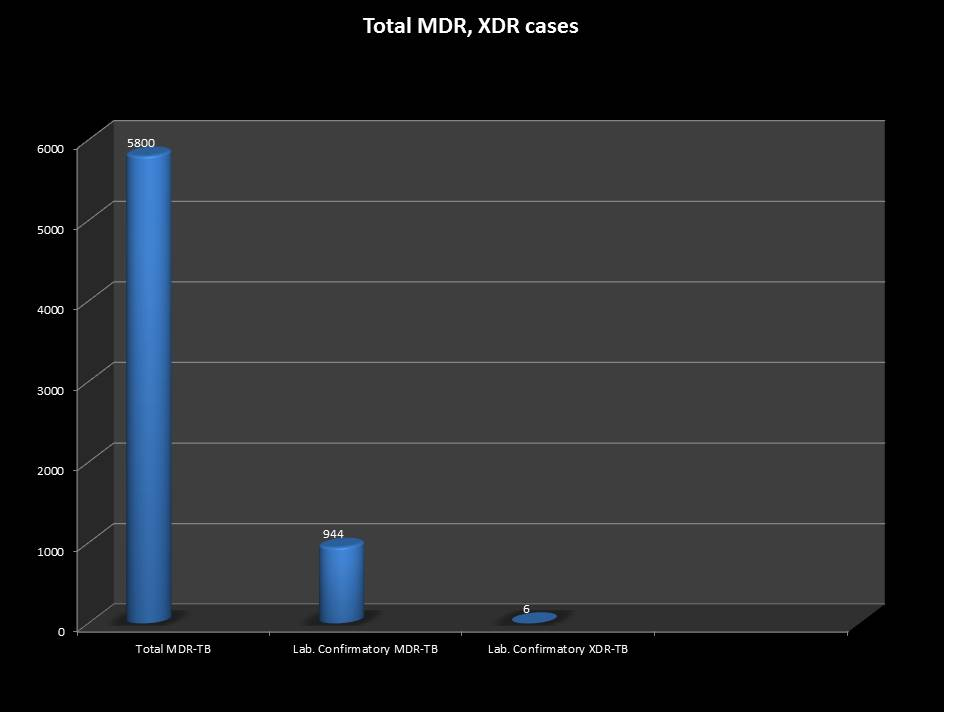
Total MDR, XDR cases

Drug resistance: When micro-organism of TB causes resistance to isoniazid or/and rifampicin the most effective drugs of TB. If the organism causes resistance against both of the drugs then it is called multi-drug-resistant tuberculosis (MDR-TB). In 2017 the estimated number of MDR was 8400, among them 5800 cases was notified and 944 patients were confirmed by laboratory test and 920 patients started immediate treatment. If any patient develops resistance against isoniazid/rifampicin and one of the 2nd line antibiotic fluoroquinolones (i.e. amikacin, kanamycin, or capreomycin), it's called extreme drug resistance tuberculosis (XDR-TB). In 2017, 6 patients were confirmed XDR-TB by laboratory diagnosis and all of them started treatment instantly. As 31 December 2017, countrywide a total 6420 MDR-TB patients were enrolled for treatment including 920. Among 920 patients, 425 patients were in 24 month regimen and 495 patients were 9 months regiment.

Bangladesh combats with TB: Under Mycrobacterial Disease Control (MBDC) Unit of the Director-General Health Service (DGHS), National Tuberculosis Control Program (NTP) is working with a goal to eliminate tuberculosis from Bangladesh. The NTP adopted DOTS (directly observed treatment, short-course) strategy during the fourth Population and Health Plan (1992–1998) and implemented it at field level in November 1993. This strategy reduced TB cases significantly. The program achieved 70% new smear-positive case reduction in 2006 and treated 85% of them since 2003. This program has successfully treated 95% of bacteriologically confirmed new pulmonary cases registered in 2016.

Indicator	Milestone		Targets	
Indicator	Milestone		SDG	End TB
Year	2020	2025	2030	2035
Reduction of deaths due to tuberculosis ( Projected 2015 baselines (72450) in absolute number	47092	18112	7245	3622

Table-1: Bangladesh Indicator in Line with End TB Strategy

In 2015 the TB case was noted 225/ per 100000 patient and the Government of Bangladesh has taken the target of reduction of TB New cases 10/ per 100000 patients by 2035 that will be around 1650 cases.

=== Non-communicable diseases of Bangladesh ===
However, recent statistics shows that non-communicable disease burden has increased to 61% of the total disease burden due to epidemiological transition. According to National NCD Risk Factor Survey in 2010, 99% of the survey population revealed at least one NCD risk factor and ≈29% showed >3 risk factors. Social transition, rapid urbanization and unhealthy dietary habit are the major stimulating reasons behind high prevalence of non-communicable diseases in Bangladesh remarkably in under-privileged communities such as rural inhabitants, urban slum dwellers.

==== Diabetes ====
Diabetes, one of four priority non-communicable diseases targeted by world leaders has become a major health problem globally (537 million adults with diabetes in 2021 and projected to increase to 642 million by 2040). High fasting plasma glucose ranks seventh among risk factors for disease in South Asia. Bangladesh has the eighth highest population of people with diabetes, at 13.1 million. Studies have shown that the prevalence of diabetes is increasing moderately to significantly in the rural population of Bangladesh. However, compared to Western nations, the major diabetic population is non-obese.

==== Eye disease related to diabetes (diabetic retinopathy) ====
The prevalence of Diabetic retinopathy in Bangladesh is about one third of the total diabetic population (nearly 1.85 million). These recent estimates are higher like western Countries and similar to Asian Malays living in Singapore. Sharp economic transition, urbanization, technology based modern life style, tight diabetes control guidelines and unwillingness to receive health care are thought to be the risk factors of diabetic retinopathy in Bangladesh. Unfortunately to attain that emerging health problem, the current capacity in the country to diagnose and treat diabetic retinopathy is very limited to a few centers. Till this year (2016), as per record of National Eye Care under HPNSDP (Health Population Nutrition Sector Development Program), 10,000 people with Diabetic Retinopathy have received services from Secondary and tertiary Hospitals where the screening programs have been established.

==== Musculoskeletal Disorders (MSDs) ====
Musculoskeletal disorders (MSDs) are a combination of inflammatory and degenerative conditions that influence the muscles, tendons, ligaments, joints or peripheral nerves, normally leading to aches, pains or discomfort. These are the most usual cause of severe long-term pain, physical disability and premature deaths. MSDs are one of the most prevalent occupational diseases liable for work limitation and absenteeism. Besides, these diseases can manifest as acute or chronic problems and can be incapacitating for their patients leading to huge costs for health systems particularly for chronic pain.

===== Risk factors =====
The causes of MSDs can be exposure to work-related or ergonomic risk factors and individual related risk factors. Repeated manual labor, lifting heavy loads, prolonged static work, overexertion, vibration, or working in an awkward posture usually leads work related MSDs. Extended working hours and uncomfortable postures were significantly associated with the risk of MSDs and workers who work for conventional working hours (8 hrs per day) were less prone to develop MSDs. Among Ready Made Garments workers lower back and upper back are the most affected area due to prolonged work and wrong posture. Moreover, work breaks, working under pressure or with deadlines, poor job design, job insecurity, and lack of social support from colleagues and supervisors are directly related to stress, and that stress can appear in increased muscle tension and other stress-related differences to the body, making workers more vulnerable to developing MSDs. Workers often work for extended hours in awkward position can also suffer MSDs. Age, gender, health and lifestyle are the individual risk factors that are responsible for the higher risk of MSDs and other chronic conditions.

===== Common Musculoskeletal disorders =====
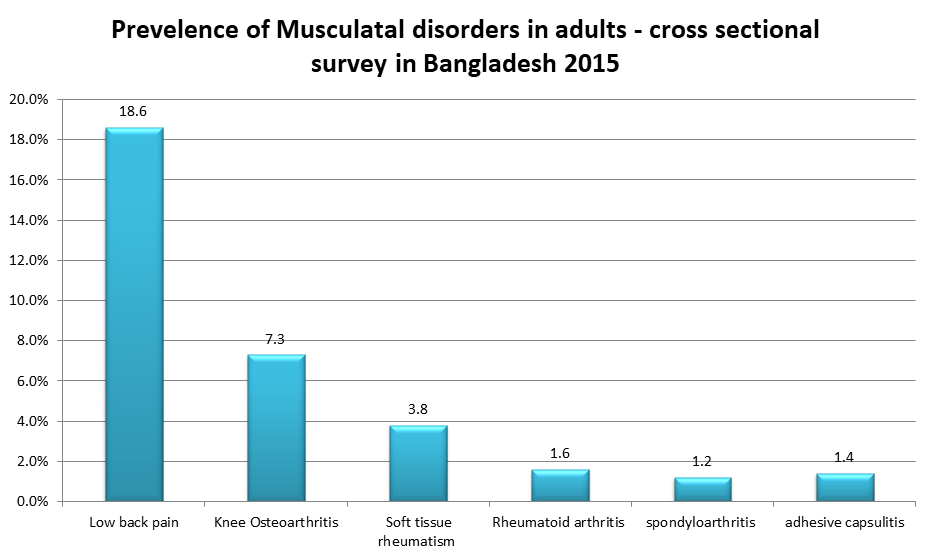
Musculatal disorders in Adults in Bangladesh

Person's skills and functions are affected by Musculoskeletal disorders and therefore influence their activities of daily life. Back and neck pain, osteoarthritis, rheumatoid arthritis and fractures are the most disabling conditions. Moreover, these are often correlated with major non-communicable co-morbidities (ischemic heart disease, stroke, cancer and chronic respiratory disease) and they jointly increase disabilities and deaths.

The most prevalent MSDs in Bangladesh is low back pain (18.6%). Rapid urbanization, transition to sedentary work, weight gain; domestic and professional activities in banding posture may be responsible for the higher prevalence of low back pain in Bangladesh. The second commonest MSDs are knee osteoarthritis (7.3%) and it is related to more knee usage during occupational and household chores in Bangladesh. Besides these soft tissue injuries and rheumatism can be the third commonest disorders (3.8%)

Among the female readymade garment workers in Bangladesh, the prevalence of lower back pain (41%) was the most leading accompanied by pain in the knees(33%) and neck pain (28%).

===== Prevention =====
Musculoskeletal disorders are mostly preventable and prevention is the best treatment. Therefore, understanding these disorders and the risk factors for their development is fundamental to solutions that would improve the lives of workers in Bangladesh. Developing an effective prevention strategy usually requires a risk assessment and implementation of technical, organizational, and person-oriented measures.

==== Mental health ====
According to WHO, "mental health is a state of well-being in which the individual realizes his or her own abilities, can cope with the normal stresses of life, can work productively and fruitfully, and is able to make a contribution to his or her community."

==== Environmental sanitation ====
The most difficult problem to tackle in this country is perhaps the environmental sanitation problem which is multi-faceted and multi-factorial. The twin problems of environmental sanitation are lack of safe drinking water in many areas of the country and preventive methods of excreta disposal.

- Indiscriminate defecation resulting in filth and water born disease like diarrhea, dysentery, enteric fever, hepatitis, hook worm infestations.
- Poor rural housing with no arrangement for proper ventilation, lighting etc.
- Poor sanitation of public eating and market places.
- Inadequate drainage, disposal of refuse and animal waste.
- Absence of adequate MCH care services.
- Absence and/ or adequate health education to the rural areas.
- Absence and/or inadequate communications and transport facilities for workers of the public health.

==== Malnutrition ====
Bangladesh suffers from some of the most severe malnutrition problems. The present per capita intake is only 1850 kilocalorie which is by any standard, much below the required need. Malnutrition results from the convergence of poverty, inequitable food distribution, disease, illiteracy, rapid population growth and environmental risks, compounded by cultural and social inequities. Severe undernutrition exists mainly among families of landless agricultural labourers and farmers with a smallholding.

Specific nutritional problems in the country are:

1. Protein–energy malnutrition (PEM): The chief cause of it is insufficient food intake.
2. Nutritional anaemia: The most frequent cause is iron deficiency and less frequently folate and vitamin B12 deficiency.
3. Xerophthalmia: The chief cause is nutritional deficiency of Vit-A.
4. Iodine Deficiency Disorders: Goiter and other iodine deficiency disorders.
5. Others: Lathyrism, endemic fluorosis etc.

Child malnutrition in Bangladesh is amongst the highest in the world. Two-thirds of the children under the age of five are under-nourished and about 60% of children under age six, are stunted. As of 1985, more than 45 percent of rural families and 76 percent of urban families were below the acceptable caloric intake level. Malnutrition is passed on through generations as malnourished mothers give birth to malnourished children. About one-third of babies in Bangladesh are born with low birth weight, increasing infant mortality rate, and an increased risk of diabetes and heart ailments in adulthood. One neonate dies in Bangladesh every three to four minutes; 120 000 neonates die every year.

The World Bank estimates that Bangladesh is ranked 1st in the world of the number of children suffering from malnutrition. In Bangladesh, 26% of the population are undernourished and 46% of the children suffers from moderate to severe underweight problem. 43% of children under 5 years old are stunted. One in five preschool age children are vitamin A deficient and one in two are anaemic. Women also suffer most from malnutrition. To provide their family with food they pass on quality food which are essential for their nutrition.

===== Causes of malnutrition =====
Most terrain of Bangladesh is low-lying and is prone to flooding. A large population of the country lives in areas that are at risk of experiencing extreme annual flooding that brings large destruction to the crops. Every year, 20% to 30% of Bangladesh is flooded. Floods threaten food security and their effects on agricultural production cause food shortage.

The health and sanitation environment also affects malnutrition. Inadequacies in water supply, hygiene and sanitation have direct impacts on infectious diseases, such as malaria, parasitic diseases, and schistosomiasis. People are exposed to both water scarcity and poor water quality. Groundwater is often found to contain high arsenic concentration. Sanitation coverage in rural areas was only 35% in 1995.

Almost one in three people in Bangladesh defecates in the open among the poorest families. Only 32% of the latrines in rural areas attain the international standards for a sanitary latrine. People are exposed to feces in their environment daily. The immune system falls and the disease processes exacerbate loss of nutrients, which worsens malnutrition. The diseases also contribute through the loss of appetite, lowered absorption of vitamins and nutrients, and loss of nutrients through diarrhoea or vomiting.

Unemployment and job problems also lead to malnutrition in Bangladesh. In 2010, the unemployment rate was 5.1%. People do not have working facilities all year round and they are unable to afford the minimum cost of a nutritious diet due to the unsteady income.

===== Health effects =====
Undernourished mothers often give birth to infants who will have difficulty with development, pertaining to health problems such as wasting, stunting, underweight, anaemia, night blindness and iodine deficiency. As a result, Bangladesh has a high child mortality rate and is ranked 57 in the under-5 mortality rank.

===== Economic effects =====
As 40% of the population in Bangladesh are children, malnutrition and its health effects among children can potentially lead to a lower educational attainment rate. Only 50% of an age group of children in Bangladesh managed to enroll into secondary school education. This would result in a low-skilled and low productivity workforce which would affect the economic growth rate of Bangladesh with only 3% GDP growth in 2009.

===== Efforts to combat malnutrition =====
Many programmes and efforts have been implemented to solve the problem of malnutrition in Bangladesh. UNICEF together with the government of Bangladesh and many other NGOs such as Helen Keller International, focus on improving the nutritional access of the population throughout their life-cycle from infants to the child-bearing mother. The impacts of the intervention are significant. Night blindness has reduced from 3.76% to 0.04% and iodine deficiency among school-aged children has decreased from 42.5% to 33.8%.

==== Maternal and child health status in Bangladesh ====
Maternal and child health is an important issue in a country like Bangladesh. Bangladesh is one of the developing countries who signed onto achieving the Sustainable Development Goals (SDGs). In the new target of SDGs the issue of maternal and child health is fitting under goal number three. Over the last two decades, national health policy and strategies progressed with significant achievements. Still now Bangladesh is aiming to reduce maternal and child mortality through its renovation process.

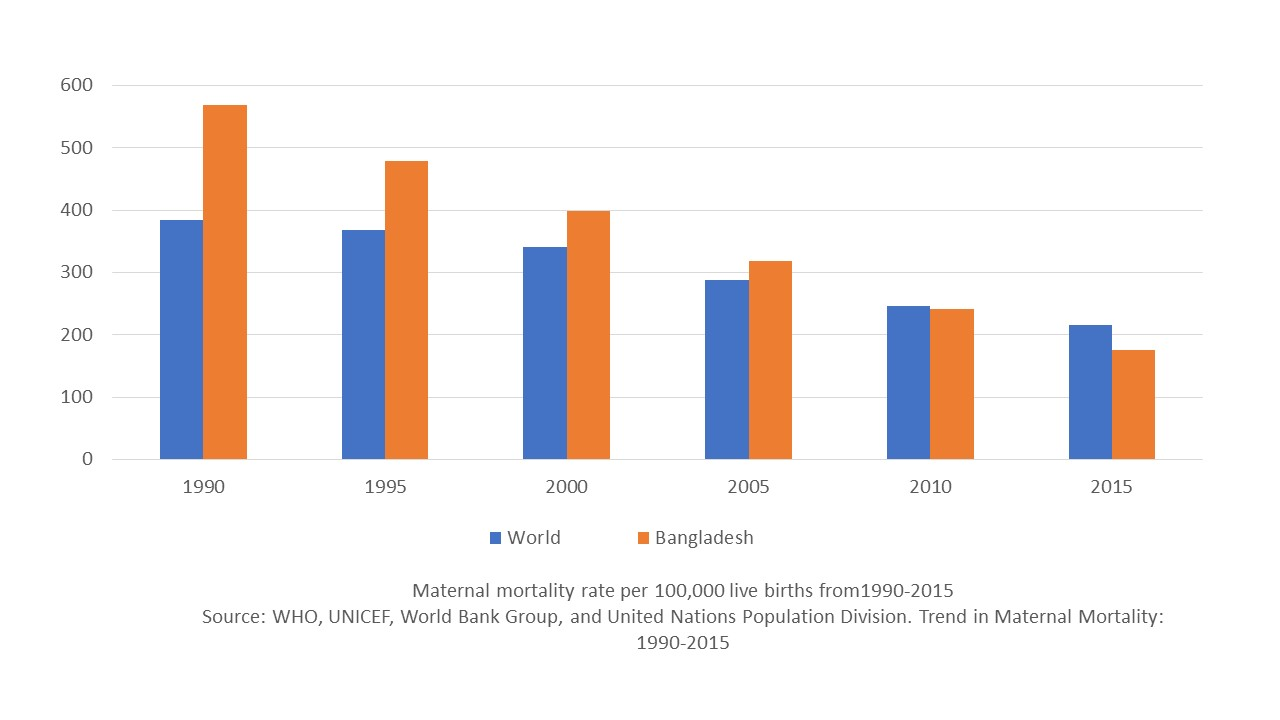
MMR in Bangladesh

===== Maternal health =====
The MDG Goal five target was to reduce the maternal mortality rate (MMR) from 574 to 143 deaths per 100,000 live births by 2015 in Bangladesh. There has been a significant downfall in the MMR rates; however, the trajectory is not enough to meet the targets.

The maternal mortality rate (MMR) per 100,000 live births was estimated at 385 globally and 563 in Bangladesh in 1990. In 2015, MMR was 176 per 100,000 live births in Bangladesh and 216 globally. However, the number of deaths of women while pregnant or within 42 days of termination of the pregnancy in Bangladesh were 21,000 in 1990 which reduced dramatically and reached at 5,500 in 2015.

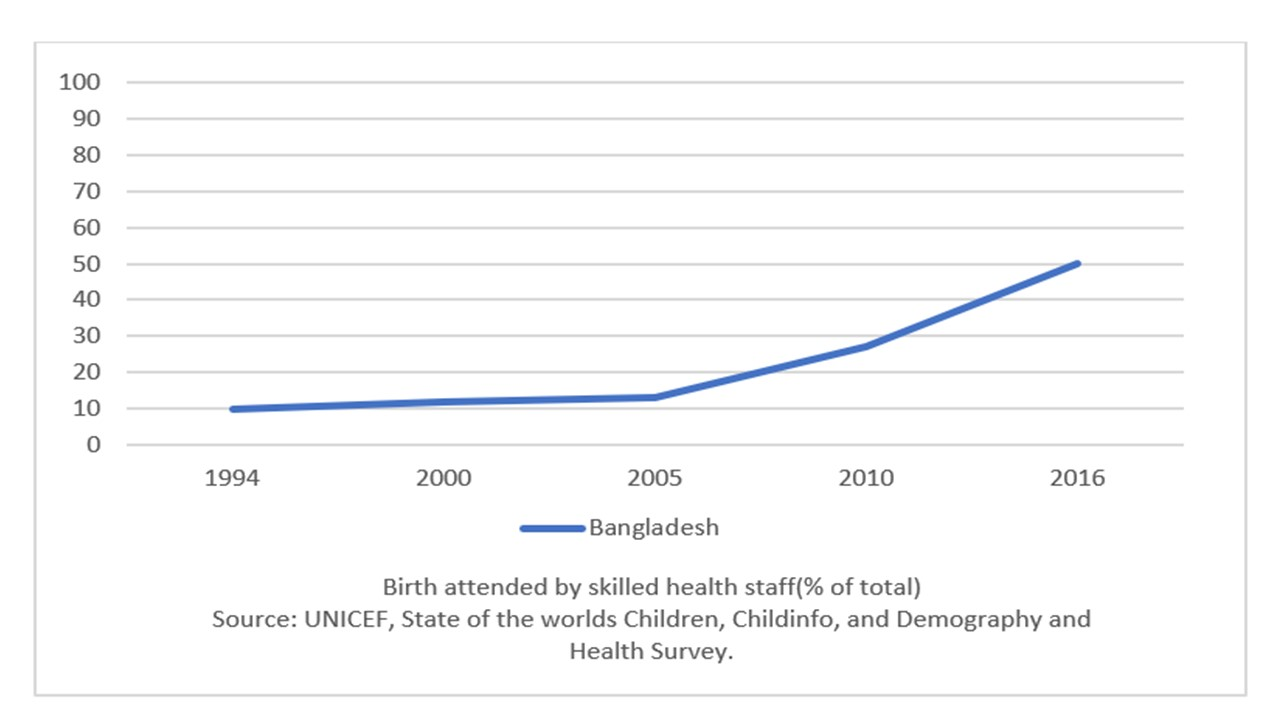
Birth attended rate in Bangladesh

The reduction in maternal mortality is attributed to multiple factors. The factors like improved assess and utilization of health facilities, improvements in female education and per capita income helped to achieve the goal. Fertility reduction have also contributed to reduce MMR by lowering the number of high risk, high parity births. However, the antenatal care (ANC) coverage has been increased between 1990 and 2014. The proportion of women receiving at least one antenatal visit rose from 28% in 1990 to 64% in 2014 from a medically trained provider.

In 2014, the population of women aged 15–49 who received postnatal care within 2 days after giving birth was 36%, antenatal coverage for at least four visits was 31%, proportion of births attended by skilled health personnel was 42%, caesarean section was 23%, proportion of women age 20–24 years old who gave birth before 18 years was 36%, number of women age 15–49 years with a live birth delivery in a health facility was 37% and births who had their first postnatal check-up within the first two days after birth was 31% in Bangladesh.

The major causes of Maternal Mortality are - postpartum haemorrhage (31%), Eclampsia /pre-eclampsia (20%), delayed & obstructed labour (7%), Abortion (1%), other direct cause (5%) and indirect cause (35%). In Bangladesh prevalence of undernourishment among adolescent girls and pregnant women is very high, and one-third of such women have low BMI and anemia. In urban area, anemia and Vitamin A deficiency was found to be prevalent among most of the pregnant mothers.

===== Child health =====
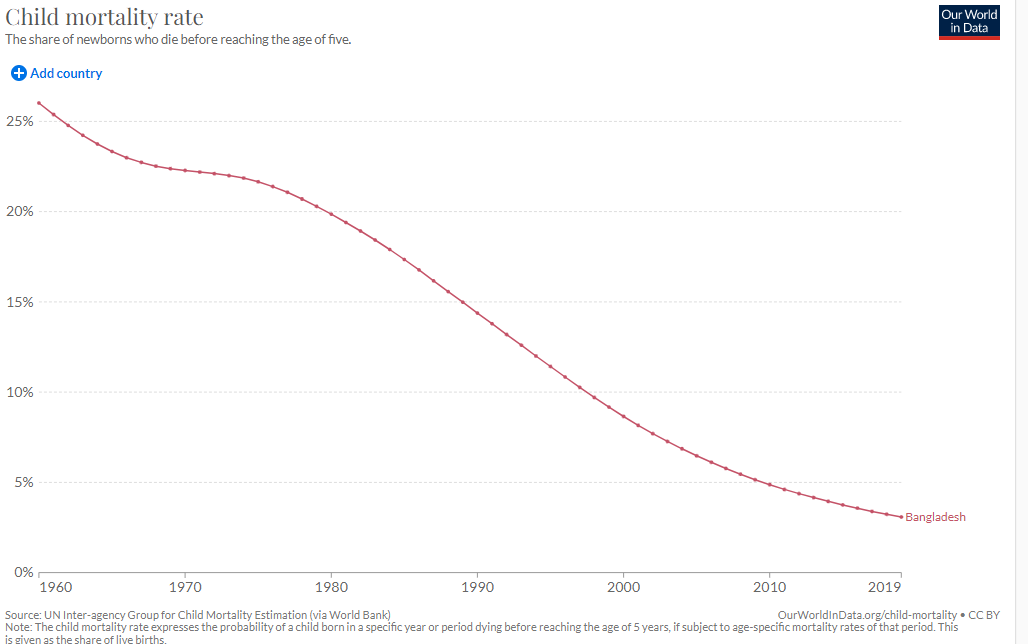
Development of child mortality rate in Bangladesh since 1960

To achieve the MDG-4 target, Bangladesh has experienced a significant reduction of child mortality over the past decades. But under 5 mortality must be reduced to achieve the SDG Goal three target. Neonatal mortality is a puissant part of overall child mortality. Neonatal mortality rate of Bangladesh fell gradually from 1990 to 2015. In 1990, per 1000 live births under five mortality rate and Infant Mortality Rate was 93 and 64 globally but in Bangladesh it was higher than the global average. In 2017, global under five mortality rate and infant mortality rate was 39 and 29 per 1000 live births respectively and in Bangladesh this rate was lower than the world average.

Childhood Mortality Trends in Bangladesh (Deaths per 1000 live births)
Category	1990	1995	2000	2005	2010	2015	2017	2020
Under-5 mortality rate	143.80	114.00	87.40	66.20	49.20	36.40	32.40	27.27
Infant mortality rate	97.70	80.90	64.00	50.40	38.90	29.80	26.90	22.91
Neonatal mortality rate	64.10	52.30	42.40	34.90	27.40	20.70	18.40	16.00

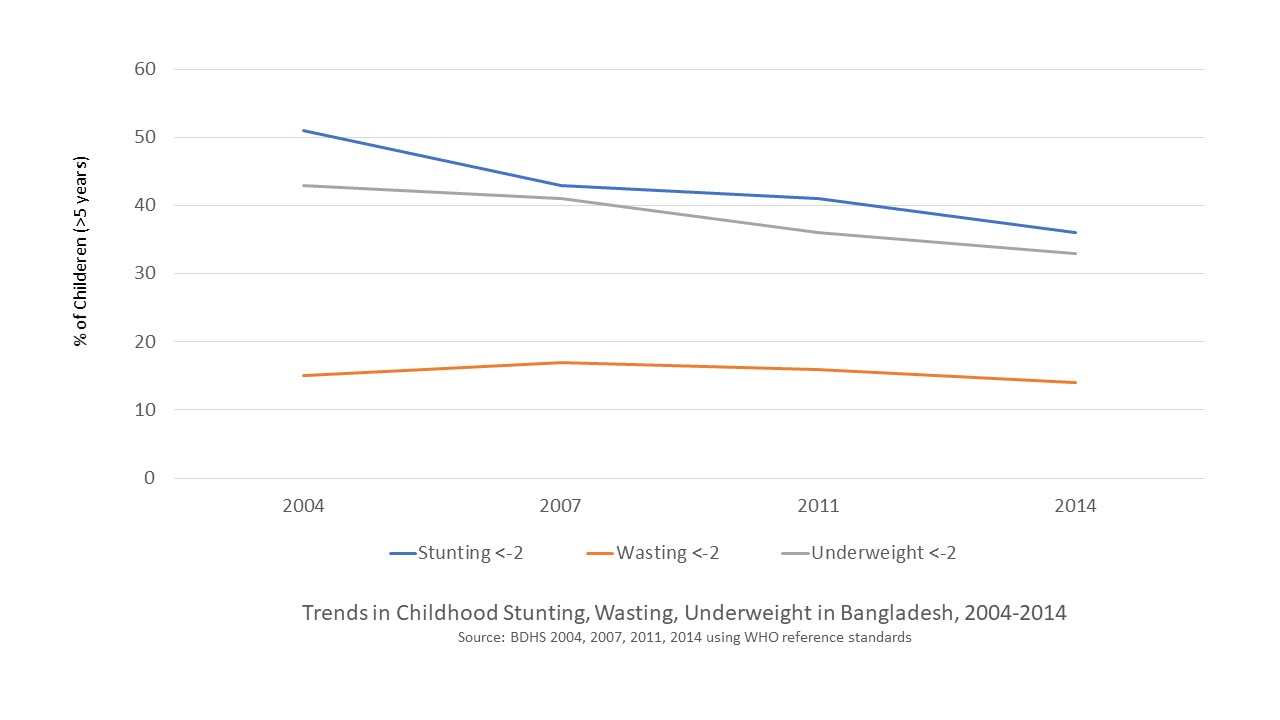
Trends of stunting, wasting, underweight in Bangladesh, 2004-2014

In 1990, the number of under-5 deaths, infant deaths, and neonatal deaths were 532193.00, 368085.00 and 240316.00 and in 2017 the number reduced and reached at 99608.00, 82240.00 and 56341.00 respectively. The major causes of under-5 child mortality were preterm birth 18%, intrapartum 13.8%, pneumonia 13.5%, sepsis 11%, congenital 9.1%, injury 7.9%, diarrhoea 7.1%, measles 1.9% and other 15.9%.

A study on risk factors of infant mortality, using data from the 2014 Bangladesh Demographic and Health Survey, showed that the risk of mortality in Bangladesh is 1.5 times higher for smaller babies. Infant mortality in Bangladesh is also lower for the urban population as well as for higher economic classes (which have greater access to health services).

In Bangladesh, just over half of all children were anemic in 2011. A number of interventions have taken to address this issue, including the distribution of iron supplements and deworming tablets every 6 months till 5 years of age. However, children age 6–59 months receive Vitamin-A capsules twice a year. Between 2004 and 2014 the prevalence of children who are stunted, and underweight declined 29% and 23% respectively. But the prevalence of wasting showed very little change during this period.

===== Maternal and child health care delivery system =====
In the health system of Bangladesh, maternal and Child Health (MCH) services have been given highest priority. At the society level, MCH services are provided by the Family Welfare Assistants and Health Assistants. A Family Welfare Visitor (FWV) along with a Sub‑Assistant Community Medical Officer or Medical Assistants are responsible for providing the services, at the union level. At Upazila level, Medical officer provides MCH services in Upazila Health Complex. The activities of the Maternal and Child Health unit along with other maternal health care services are overseen by Upazila Health and Family Planning Officer in the Upazila Health Complex. The district hospitals provide maternal services through an outpatient consultation center and a labor ward. However, to provide MCH services private sector is playing supplementary and often competitive role in health sector with public one. NGOs also have a significant role providing primary, reproductive and family planning services.

Level of care and type of health facility in Bangladesh
Level of Care	Administrative Unit	Facility
Tertiary level	Division or Capital	Teaching Hospital/Institute
Secondary level	District	District Hospital
Primary level	Upazila Union Ward	Upazila Health Complex Union Health and Family Welfare Centres Community Clinic
Source: DGHS, 2010^{[23]} DGHS: Directorate General of Health Services

===== Development of maternal and child health policy =====
In following decades, Bangladesh government's policy concentrated on reduction of population growth; policy perceived that a consistent maternal and child health based family planning programme would help to achieve development goals. The Health and Population Sector Strategy (HPSS) was developed in 1997. The following seven strategies were included in the HPSP (MOHFW, 1998): 1) Focus on Emergency Obstetric Care for reducing maternal mortality, 2) Provision of Essential Obstetric Care/Basic maternity care services for promotion of "good practices" including early detection and appropriate referral of complications 3) Addressing the needs of women through a woman friendly hospital initiative 4) Communication for behaver change and development 5) Involvement of professional bodies 6) Stakeholder participation 7) Promotion of innovation. This policy document is theoretical framework of what is necessary and expected for improvement of maternal health situation in national level and It includes maternal services such as emergency obstetric care, antenatal care, skilled attendance, postnatal care, neonatal care and family planning.

==== Occupational health ====
Occupational health deals with all aspects of health and safety in the workplace and has a strong focus on primary prevention of hazards.

===== Health problems of female workers in RMG sector =====
Bangladesh has emerged as a key player in RMG (Ready Made Garment) sector since 1978. Textiles and clothing account for about 85% of total export earnings of Bangladesh. Before the starting of RMG sector, woman's participation in the formal economy has been low compared to man but in late 1980s after orienting this sector, the scenario has dramatically changed and now 80 percent of the total employment in RMG sector is occupied by female worker. But the health of this 'women-driven sector' is neglected.

===== Reproductive health problem of workers =====
Bangladesh has made significant progress in reducing maternal mortality. However, the work environment of RMG has the potential to create health problems, particularly for vulnerable groups such as pregnant women. This paper explores perceptions of health problems during pregnancy of factory workers, in this important industry in Bangladesh. Female workers reported that participation in paid work created an opportunity for them to earn money but pregnancy and the nature of the job, including being pressured to meet the production quota, pressure to leave the job because of their pregnancy and withholding of maternity benefits, cause stress, anxiety and may contribute to hypertensive disorders of pregnancy. This was confirmed by factory doctors who suggested that developing hypertensive disorders during pregnancy was influenced by the nature of work and stress. The employers seemed focused on profit and meeting quotas and the health of pregnant workers appeared to be a lower priority. The women reported that they do not visit the factory doctor for an ante-natal check-up when they first suspect that they are pregnant because they feel they need to hide their pregnancy from their supervisors. For example, they needs to meet a production quota of one hundred pieces per hour. If they lag behind the quota due to their pregnancy, their supervisors will encourage them to leave the job. They will also not be assigned to do overtime to earn extra money. They only go to the factory clinic for a check-up during pregnancy when their pregnancy becomes visible. They also do not go to the private clinics because of the cost.

===== Healthcare for the workers =====
- BGMEA (Bangladesh Garment Manufacturers and Exporters Association) recognizes the fundamental rights of the workers, particularly access to healthcare facilities. On this spirit BGMEA runs 12 Health Centers for the garment workers and their families, provide pre-medical services and medicines at free of cost. •
- Besides, it run awareness program on HIV/ AIDS, tuberculosis, reproductive health and the use of contraceptive devices.
- In addition to this, BGMEA runs a full-fledged hospital for workers in Chittagong.
- Another hospital for workers is under construction at Mirpur in Dhaka.
- Lastly, every garment factory must have to ensure to place a health clinic with full-time doctor and nurse/medical assistance with following facilities and give proper training about health and sanitation specially to pregnant workers to minimize the health issues.

Doctor's room:

- Sickness Analysis
- Medical Issue Register
- Treatment Register
- Medicine Stock Register
- First Aid Training register
- Accident / injury Register
- Maternity Follow up file
- Medical Consolation Graph
- Maintain first aid kit

==== Substance abuse in Bangladesh ====
The use of illegal drugs or the use of prescription or over-the-counter drugs or alcohol for purposes other than those for which they are meant to be used, or in excessive amounts. Different types of social, physical, emotional, and job-related problems can arise from substance abuse. This has become a matter of headache in recent years with overuse of substances like tobacco, alcohol, yaba along with some other prescribed drugs like sedatives or drugs used for anxiety disorders.

===== Risk factors and Protective factors- =====
Risk factors can influence drug abuse in several ways. The more risks a child is exposed to, the more likely the child will abuse drugs. Some risk factors may be more powerful than others at certain stages in development, such as peer pressure during the teenage years; just as some protective factors, such as a strong parent-child bond, can have a greater impact on reducing risks during the early years. An important goal of prevention is to change the balance between risk and protective factors so that protective factors outweigh risk factors.

Risk Factors	Protective Factors
Early aggressive behavior	Self-control
Lack of Parental supervision	Parental monitoring
Peer pressure	Academic competence
Drug availability	Anti-drug Use Policies
Socio-economic condition	Strong Neighborhood Attachment

Table 1- Risk Factors and Protective Factors of Substance Abuse.

===== Prevalence of alcohol and Drug use disorders- =====
Prevalence of Alcohol and Drug use disorders	1990	2016
Bangladesh	1.90%	2.03%
World	2.33%	2.22%

Table 2- Prevalence of Alcohol and Drug use disorders.

===== Tobacco =====
Approximately 126,000 deaths accounting for 13.5% of deaths were caused by tobacco from any cause in Bangladesh in 2018. Nearly 1.5 million adults were suffering from diseases attributable to tobacco use and due to exposure to secondhand smoke around 61,000 children were suffering from diseases. The direct healthcare costs attributable to tobacco use amounted to BDT 83.9 billion annually and the annual productivity loss, due to morbidity and premature mortality from tobacco-related diseases, was estimated to be BDT 221.7 billion. Thus, the total annual economic cost amounted to BDT 305.6 billion ($3.61 billion) which is equivalent to 1.4% of the GDP of Bangladesh in 2017–18.

====== Health hazards of tobacco use ======
Smoking increases the risk of

- cancer,
- heart disease,
- stroke,
- lung diseases,
- diabetes,
- chronic obstructive pulmonary disease (COPD), which includes emphysema and chronic bronchitis,
- tuberculosis,
- certain eye diseases and
- problems of the immune system, including rheumatoid arthritis.

===== Alcohol =====
In Bangladesh, an alcoholic beverage is defined as any liquor with an alcohol content of ≥0.5%. These alcoholic beverages include beer (5% alcohol in volume), wine (12% alcohol in volume), spirits (40% alcohol in volume) and locally made alcoholic beverages (variable alcohol content). Locally produced alcoholic beverages are made from sorghum, maize, millet, rice, cider, fruit wine or fortified wine (tari, bangle mod, haria, choani, do chuani, mohua, etc.).

Though alcohol use is low in Bangladesh, those who use alcohol frequently binge drink, which is a public health concern. The use is prevalent among men, younger age groups, labourers, salaried government and nongovernment employees and businessmen, current smokers and those with a minimal educational background. Harmful use of alcohol is increasingly becoming a national concern as very few people with alcohol problems seek de-addiction treatment in Bangladesh.

====== Alcohol use disorders ======
- Injuries including motor vehicle crashes, falls, drownings, and burns
- Violence (homicide, suicide, sexual assault, and intimate partner violence)
- Alcohol poisoning
- Risky sexual behaviors such as unprotected sex or sex with multiple partners which may result in unintended pregnancy or sexually transmitted diseases
- Miscarriage and stillbirth or fetal abnormality.
- High blood pressure, heart disease, stroke, liver disease
- Learning and memory problem along with social problems
- Alcohol dependence etc.

===== Other drugs =====
The main groups of illicit drugs used in international statistics are opioids, cocaine, amphetamines and cannabis. However, there is a range of other illicit drugs included in international drug control treaties. Deaths from drug use are of two types:

- direct deaths which result from illicit drug overdoses.
- indirect deaths resulting from illicit drug use acting as a risk factor for the development of various diseases and injury.

Deaths	Direct deaths due to Drug Overdose	Indirect Deaths due to Illicit Drugs acting as Risk Factors
Bangladesh	3,216	4,804
World	166,613	585,348

Table 3- Deaths due to Illicit Drug Abuse.

====== Physical and Mental effects due to drug addiction ======
- Death
- Weakened immune system, increasing the risk of illness and infection
- Heart conditions ranging from abnormal heart rates to heart attacks and collapsed veins and blood vessel infections from injected drugs
- Nausea, abdominal pain, changes in appetite and weight loss
- Liver damage or liver failure
- Seizures, stroke, mental confusion and brain damage
- Lung disease
- Problems with memory, attention and decision-making
- Behavioral problems including paranoia, aggressiveness, hallucination, addiction, impulsiveness, loss of self-control etc.

====== Legislation ======
Previously Bangladesh had no adequate and enabling law to handle the condition created by drug abuse and the related issues.The Government of the People's Republic of Bangladesh enacted the Narcotics Control Act in 1990 annulling all the colonial laws with a view to encountering drug problem true to the aspiration of the society.

== Neglected tropical diseases of Bangladesh ==
There is a huge burden of the neglected tropical diseases (NTDs) in Bangladesh, particularly for Kala-azar; Lymphatic Filariasis, Dengue and Chikungunya.

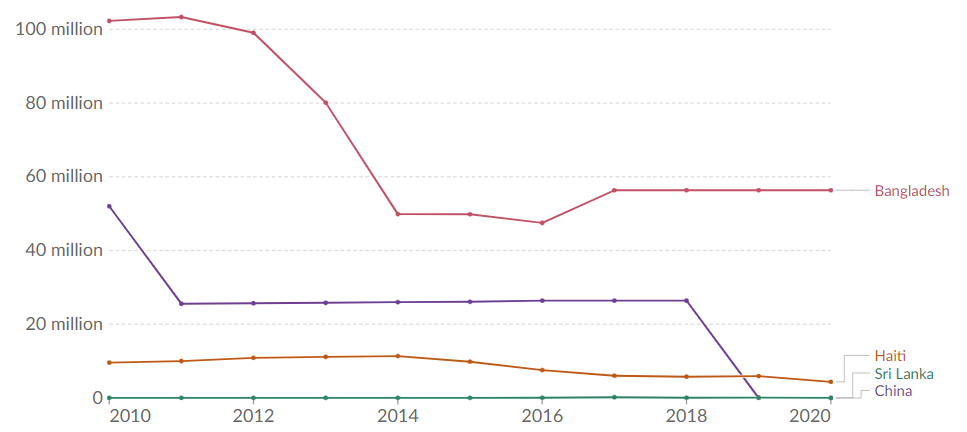
Requiring intervention for NTDs

On a global scale, Bangladesh has a higher overall prevalence of NTDs compared to other low and middle income countries like Sri Lanka, Haiti, China due to its larger population, tropical climate and socio economic factors.

=== Chikungunya ===
Chikungunya is one of the neglected tropical diseases of Bangladesh. It is a viral disease which is transmitted to humans by infected mosquitoes – including Aedes aegypti and Aedes albopictus, which is present in Bangladesh. It is an RNA virus that belongs to the alphavirus genus of the family Togaviridae. It was first described during an outbreak in southern Tanzania in 1952. Since then, CHIKV has been reported to cause several large-scale outbreaks in Africa, India, Southeast Asia, Western Pacific and Americas. In the South-East Asia region, Chikungunya virus is maintained in the human population by a human-mosquito-human transmission cycle that differs from the sylvatic transmission cycle on the African continent.

==== Transmission ====
Chikungunya is a vector-borne disease transmitted to humans by the bites of infected female mosquitoes which breed in clean water collections in containers, tanks, disposables, junk material in domestic and peri-domestic situations besides natural habitats like tree holes, plantations etc. These mosquitoes can be found biting throughout daylight hours, though there may be peaks of activity in the early morning and late afternoon. A high vector density is seen in the post monsoon season that enhances the transmission.

==== Signs and symptoms ====
It causes fever and severe joint pain. Other symptoms include muscle pain, headache, nausea, fatigue and rash. Joint pain is often debilitating and can vary in duration. Chikungunya is rarely fatal. Symptoms are generally self-limiting and last for 2–3 days. The disease shares some clinical signs with dengue and zika, and can be misdiagnosed in areas where they are common.

Here is the Clinical features of Chikungunya virus infections compared with dengue virus infections.

Table 1: Comparison of clinical features between Chikungunya and Dengue
Findings	Chikungunya	Dengue
Fever (>39 °C)	+++	++
Arthralgia	+++	+/-
Arthritis	+	-
Headache	++	++
Rash	++	+
Myalgia	+	++
Hemorrhage	+/-	++
Shock	-	+

==== Diagnosis ====
Several methods can be used for diagnosis. Serological tests, such as enzyme-linked immunosorbent assays (ELISA), may confirm the presence of IgM and IgG anti-chikungunya antibodies. IgM antibody levels are highest 3 to 5 weeks after the onset of illness and persist for about 2 months. Samples collected during the first week after the onset of symptoms should be tested by both serological and virological methods (RT-PCR).

==== Treatment ====
There is no vaccine to prevent or anti-viral drugs to treat Chikungunya virus. Treatment is directed primarily at relieving the symptoms, including the joint pain using anti-pyretics, optimal analgesics and fluids.

==== Outbreaks in Bangladesh ====
In Bangladesh, the first recognized outbreak of Chikungunya was reported in 2008 in two villages in the northwest part of the country adjacent to Indian border. Two small-scale outbreaks were documented in rural communities in 2011 and 2012.

A massive outbreak of Chikungunya occurred in Bangladesh during the period of April–September 2017 and over two million people at Dhaka, the capital of Bangladesh were at risk of getting infected by the virus. A recent research study (1326 cases) was conducted (between 24 July and 5 August 2017) to investigate the clinical profiles, economic burden, and quality of life of Chikungunya affected individuals. Severe arthropathy is the most consistent clinical feature of chikungunya infection. In this study, all patients experienced Arthalgia(100%); Pain before fever (74.66%); Skin Rash(69.6%); Itching (60.9%); Headache (77.3%) and Myalgia (69.3%) (Figure-2).

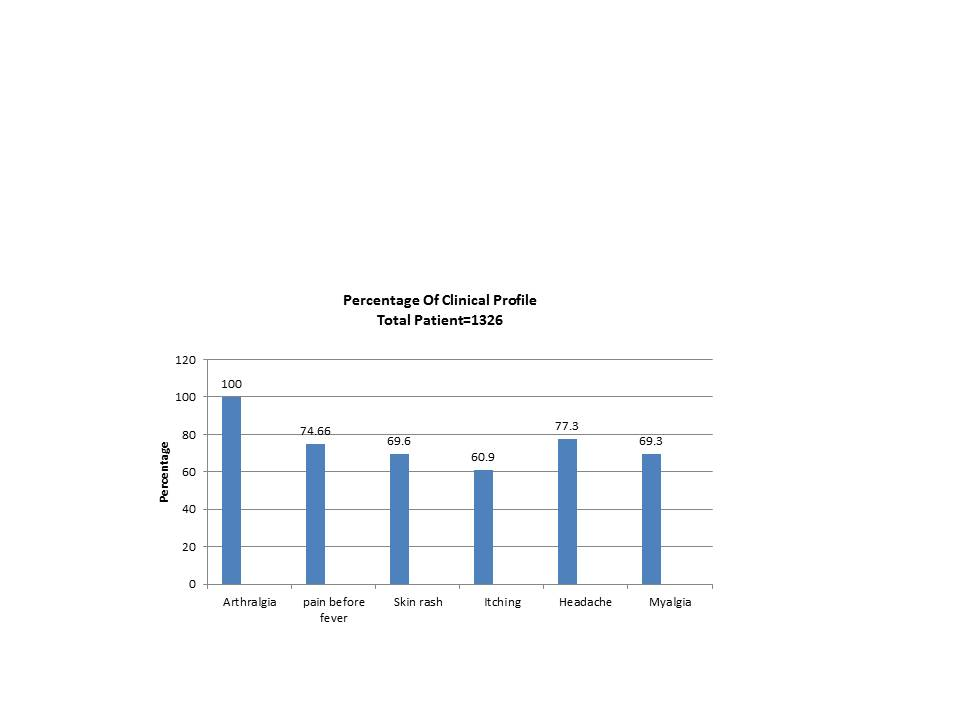
Percentage of clinical profile of Chikungunya

Also, the severity of certain clinical manifestations of Chikungunya might depend on several factors including age, gender, immune status, genetic predisposition and co-morbid conditions. Children (<15 years) tended to have a higher proportion of oligo-arthralgia and skin rash; while morning stiffness, severity, and duration of pain were proportionally lower among children as compared to other age groups. Joint swelling was most commonly noted in elderly patients (60+ years), while the severity of pain was highest among adults (30–59 years). Chikungunya infection caused significant loss of productivity due to absenteeism from job.

==== Prevention and control ====
Prevention is entirely dependent upon taking steps to avoid mosquito bites and elimination of mosquito breeding sites.

==== To avoid mosquito bites ====
Wear full sleeve clothes and long dresses to cover the limbs. Use mosquito coils, repellents and electric vapour mats during the daytime. Use mosquito nets – to protect babies, old people and others, who may rest during the day. The effectiveness of such nets can be improved by treating them with permethrin (pyrethroid insecticide). Mosquitoes become infected when they bite people who are sick with Chikungunya. Mosquito nets and mosquito coils will effectively prevent mosquitoes from biting sick people.

==== To prevent mosquito breeding ====
The Aedes mosquitoes that transmit Chikungunya breed in a wide variety of man-made containers which are common around human dwellings. These containers collect rainwater, and include discarded tires, flowerpots, old oil drums, animal water troughs, water storage vessels, and plastic food containers. These breeding sites can be eliminated by Draining water from coolers, tanks, barrels, drums and buckets, etc. Emptying coolers when not in use. Removing from the house all objects, e.g. plant saucers, etc. which have water collected in them.

Chikungunya epidemics, with the high attack rate of CHIKV, affect a large number of people in a short period of time associated with early rain fall (early monsoon) and this is also consistently seen in Bangladesh outbreak 2017. Pain, the most frequent clinical manifestation of Chikungunya, is difficult to control, compromising the quality of life, intense psychosocial and economic repercussions, causing a serious public health problem that requires a targeted approach. General physicians, Infectious disease specialists, Rheumatologist and other specialist, nurses, pain specialists, physiotherapists, social workers, and healthcare managers are required to overcome these challenges so that an explosive increase in CHIKV cases can be mitigated.

=== Recent outbreaks ===
Bangladesh is battling its worst dengue outbreak on record. The health care system is straining because of high number of sick people and hospitals are facing a shortage of beds and staff to care for patients.

=== History of dengue in Bangladesh ===
Dengue was initially documented in 1960s, known as 'Dacca fever' at the time.Since 2010, incidences of dengue seem to align with the wet season spanning from May to September and high temperatures. The climate is increasingly becoming conducive to the spread of dengue due to heavy rainfall, waterlogging. floods, rising temperatures, and unexpected alterations in the country's seasons.

== Epidemiology of dengue in Bangladesh ==
Between 1 January and 19 August 2023, Bangladesh reported 97,476 cases of dengue, resulting in 466 deaths. This outbreak affected 37.6% women and 17.8% children under 18. The World Health Organization noted that dengue had spread to all 64 districts in Bangladesh. In Cox's Bazar, specific Rohingya camps were hotspots for dengue cases.

It is estimated that around 80-90% people in Dhaka and Chittagong city had been infected with dengue in their lifetime.

Table 2: Case fatality rate(CFR) in Bangladesh(2018–2023)
Year	CFR
2018	0.26%
2019	0.16%
2020	Not Available Due To Covid
2021	0.37%
2022	0.45%
2023	0.47% (Til 7 August 2023)

Causes of high dengue prevalence in Bangladesh:

- Rapidly growing and densely populated cities
- Unplanned urbanisation
- People store water in buckets, plastic containers and elsewhere because of water supply problem where mosquitoes can live all year round.
- Increasing number of high rise buildings with car parks in the basement where people wash their car, which is ideal for mosquitoes.
- Plenty of water lying around the construction sites.
- Aedes aegypti has developed resistance to insecticides like malathion.

Dengue vaccination has been investigated as a potential measure to reduce the burden of dengue in Bangladesh. A single-dose vaccine candidate, TV005, developed by the United States National Institutes of Health in collaboration with researchers at the University of Vermont and Johns Hopkins University, has undergone clinical evaluation. A randomised, placebo-controlled trial conducted in Dhaka evaluated the vaccine's safety and ability to generate an immune response among participants aged 1–50 years.

== See also ==
- Arsenic contamination of groundwater
- Blood donation in Bangladesh
- Health policy in Bangladesh
- HIV/AIDS in Bangladesh
- Poverty in Bangladesh
- Vaccination in Bangladesh
- Water supply and sanitation in Bangladesh
