= Health policy in Bangladesh =

2011 policy document

== National Health Policy 2011 (NHP) ==
The Health Policy has 19 goals and objectives, 16 policy principles and 39 strategies.

=== Policy contents ===
The Bangladesh health policy document was published in 2011 and adheres to the following :

Health is defined as "A state of complete physical, mental and social well-being and not merely the absence of disease or infirmity."

1. Every citizen has the basic right to adequate health care. The State and the government are constitutionally obliged to ensure health care for its citizens.
2. To ensure an effective health care system that responds to the need of a healthy nation, health policy provides the vision and mission for development.
3. Pursuit of such policy will fulfill the demands of the people of the country, while health service providers will be encouraged and inspired. People's physical well-being and free thought process have proved to be a precondition for the growth and intellectual enrichment in today's human society
4. Bangladesh expressed agreement on the following declarations:
  - The Alma Ata Declaration (1978)
  - The World Summit for Children (1990)
  - International Conference on Population and Development (1994)
  - Beijing Women's Conference (1995)

In the absence of a written and approved Health Policy, the national Annual Development Program and Five Year Plans substituted for policy principles. The problems in the health services multiplied in the absence of a clear policy. Bangladesh is a developing country with the world's highest population density.

=== History of the development of the policy ===
The Ministry of Health and Family Welfare assembled a Committee in 1996 for the purpose of preparing a health policy, with members drawn from civil society and professional bodies, including technocrats and bureaucrats.

A further five sub-committees were formed to:

- Evaluate the existing health services and determining the goals
- Formulate policies to ensure essential services
- Formulate policies to ensure hospital-based services
- Design Strategies for HRD
- Integrate NGOs and the Private Sector and plan for resources and utilisation of funds

The sub-committees worked for more than a year and submitted their efforts/recommendations. A working group was formed and entrusted with the responsibilities for compiling the recommendations contained in the reports. The working group also organised workshops in all six Divisions to elicit opinions of cross-section of the society on these reports. Finally the working group presented the proposals and recommendations to the National Health Policy Formulation Committee. A report on the health policy was thus formulated on the basis of consensus. The Cabinet on 14 Aug 2000 approved the National Health Policy.

== Health care system ==
The health care are designated to meet the health needs of the community through the use of available knowledge and resources. The services provided should be comprehensive and community based. The resources must be distributed according to the needs of the community. The outcome of good health care system is the changed health status or improve health status of the community which is expressed in terms of lives saved, death averted, disease prevented, disease treated, prolongation of life etc.

Health care delivery system in Bangladesh based on PHC concept has got various Level of service delivery:

- Home and community level.
- Union level,
- Union sub centre (USC) or Health and family welfare centre; This is the first health facility level.
- Thana level, Thana Health Complex (THC): This is the first referral level.
- District Hospital: This is the secondary referral level.
- National Level: This is the tertiary referral level.

A) Primary level health care is delivered though USC or HFWC with one in each union domiciliary level, integrated health and family planning services through field workers for every 3000–4000 population and 31 bed capacities in hospitals.

B) The secondary level health care is provided through 500 bed capacities in district hospital. Facilities provide specialist services in internal medicine, general surgery, gynecology, paediatrics and obstetrics, eye clinical, pathology, blood transfusion and public health laboratories.

C) Tertiary Level health care is available at the medical college hospital, public health and medical institutes and other specialist hospitals at the national level where a mass wide range of specialised as well as better laboratory facilities are available.

The referral system will be developed keeping in view the following.

1. A clearly spent-out linkage between the specialised national institutes, medical college and district hospitals to ensure proper care and treatment of patients from the rural areas served by lower level facilities.

2. Patients from the rural areas referred by lower level facilities to district and medical college hospitals and specialised institutions should get preferential treatment after admission

== See also ==
- Health in Bangladesh
- Blood donation in Bangladesh
- HIV/AIDS in Bangladesh
- Water supply and sanitation in Bangladesh
