= Bangladesh and the International Monetary Fund =

Bangladesh joined the International Monetary Fund (IMF) on August 17, 1972. On July 24, 2022, the Government of Bangladesh sent a letter to the IMF seeking a loan of approximately four billion dollars. However, although Bangladesh had previously taken loans from the IMF multiple times, those loans were limited to within one billion dollars.

On April 13, 2022, the IMF board approved the Resilience and Sustainability Fund (RSF) for low- and middle-income countries at risk due to climate change. The fund became effective on May 1, 2022. Bangladesh is the first country in Asia to receive a loan from the IMF's Resilience and Sustainability Fund (RSF). The first country in the world to receive a loan from this IMF fund is Barbados, followed by Costa Rica and Rwanda. However, Bangladesh tops the list of countries receiving loans from the RSF.

== Financial crisis ==
=== In the twentieth century ===
In 1973, several floods and droughts led to a massive crop shortage. By the autumn of 1974, there were no food reserves left in the country. Additionally, the increase in oil prices on the international market, rising transportation costs, and uncontrolled inflation altogether created a situation beyond the government's control. As a result, for various reasons, a famine occurred in Bangladesh in 1974.

Research on the 1974 famine reveals that the average food grain production in 1974 was "locally the highest." Therefore, researchers argue, "In explaining the 1974 famine, the availability of food does not sufficiently explain the famine." They argue with evidence that the famine in Bangladesh was not due to a failure in food availability, but rather due to a failure in distribution, during which a group "established dominance over food in the market." Two distribution failures are responsible for this.

The first failure was internal: due to the specific structure of the rationing system in the market and the state, farmers and traders hoarded grain, which led to a rise in prices. The second failure was external: the United States had withheld 2.2 million tons of food aid because the then U.S. ambassador had clearly stated that, due to Bangladesh's policy of exporting jute to Cuba, the U.S. might not be able to commit to food aid. And when, under U.S. pressure, Bangladesh stopped exporting jute to Cuba, by the time food aid arrived, it was "too late for the famine."

A crisis also arose regarding the Bangladeshi currency in 1975. The government suspected that for every one-hundred-taka note supposed to be in circulation, ten times more were actually circulating in the market. As a result, in April 1975, the government declared the one hundred-taka note invalid.

=== In the twenty-first century ===
Since 2013, Bangladesh's reserves began to gradually increase. At the end of June that year, the amount of reserves was 15.32 billion dollars. In August 2021, for the first time, the reserves reached 48.06 billion dollars. After that, it started to decline again. Although Bangladesh's foreign currency reserves stood at 45.5 billion dollars that year, by July 20, 2022, they had dropped to 37.67 billion dollars. From July 2021 to May 2022, Bangladesh's current account deficit amounted to 17.2 billion dollars, which was only 2.78 billion dollars during the same period the previous year. In a letter sent to the IMF, the Government of Bangladesh stated that imports during this period had increased by 39 percent compared to the previous year.

Due to a decrease in remittances and a significant increase in imports—alongside rising prices of fuel oil, gas, and food products compared to export earnings—the trade deficit widened significantly. As a result, complications arose regarding the balance of payments. To manage the foreign exchange crisis, Bangladesh Bank released dollars into the market. Consequently, the country's foreign currency reserves declined alarmingly. According to data from Bangladesh Bank, on October 19, 2022, the reserves stood at 35.98 billion dollars.

In January 2023, the International Monetary Fund came to Bangladesh to discuss the approval of a proposed loan to address the ongoing dollar shortage and economic downturn. Later, from Washington, the IMF announced that its executive board had approved Bangladesh's loan request, and in total, Bangladesh would receive a loan of 4.7 billion dollars.

== Loan conditions ==
In its commitment to the IMF for obtaining the loan, Bangladesh stated that efforts are underway to bring down non-performing loans of state-owned banks to within 10 percent and those of private sector banks to within 5 percent by 2026. For this, memoranda of understanding are being signed with banks, setting targets for capital adequacy ratios and full provisioning against non-performing loans. During the 2022–23 fiscal year, to secure the 4.7-billion-dollar loan from the IMF and to tackle the ongoing economic crisis, Bangladesh Bank and the government undertook reform programs over several months.

== Loan history ==
Bangladesh took a loan from the IMF for the first time in 1974 and, before 2022, had sought loans ten times. According to information provided on the IMF's website, between 1980 and 1990, Bangladesh borrowed money from the IMF five times over a span of ten years. When a country faces a balance of payments crisis or a reserve shortage, it generally turns to the International Monetary Fund. However, the IMF imposes certain conditions related to financial sector reforms when providing loans.

A significant positive transformation occurred in Bangladesh during the 1990s. As a result, the country's import situation improved within a short time, and the export trade also experienced a positive impact. After trade liberalization and the introduction of a democratic system, Bangladesh attracted a large volume of foreign investment. Additionally, the practice of sending manpower from Bangladesh to various countries around the world became widespread. As a result, there was no notable shortage of foreign currency. For this reason, from 1991 to 2002, Bangladesh did not take any loans from the IMF. Bangladesh again received a loan from the IMF in 2003. The most recent loan before 2022 was in 2012, when it received nearly one billion dollars.

In 2022, it was announced that the IMF would provide Bangladesh with 4.5 billion dollars in total over seven installments. The interest rate for repaying this loan was determined based on the market rate, averaging 2.2 percent. As part of the loan process, an IMF delegation held meetings in Dhaka from October 26 to November 9. The delegation met with Bangladesh Bank, the Bangladesh Energy Regulatory Commission, and almost all key government departments. On the final day of the meetings, November 9, the finance minister presented the reasons for seeking the loan to the IMF.

Three days after the loan was approved, on February 2, 2023, Bangladesh Bank received the first installment of the IMF loan, amounting to 476 million dollars. The loan will be disbursed in phases over a period of forty-two months, or three and a half years. Therefore, the entire loan process will be completed by 2026. Under this process, 3.2 billion dollars will be provided under the Extended Credit Facility and the Extended Fund Facility, and 1.3 billion dollars under the Resilience and Sustainability Facility.

The primary objectives of this loan approval are to ensure macroeconomic stability in Bangladesh, sustain growth, manage pressure on the exchange balance, and support the climate protection fund.

Bangladesh has taken loans totaling 140 billion dollars for various mega projects. Loan repayments will begin in 2023, with the interest payment amounts also increasing. For the Rooppur Nuclear Power Project alone, beginning in 2023, 565 million dollars in annual interest will have to be paid.
