= Rafiq Azad =

Bangladeshi poet, editor and writer

- রফিক আজাদ
- Born: Rafiqul Islam Khan; February 14, 1941; Tangail, Bengal Presidency, British India
- Died: March 12, 2016 (aged 75); Dhaka, Bangladesh
- Education: University of Dhaka
- Occupations: Poet, literary editor
- Years active: 1973–2016
- Known for: Patriotic, romantic and protest poems
- Notable work: Chuniya Amar Arcadia
- Movement: Realism, Modernism, Romanticism
- Relatives: Anwar Ul Alam Shaheed (brother-in-law)
- Awards: Bangla Academy Award, Ekushey Padak

Rafiq Azad (born Rafiqul Islam Khan; February 14, 1941 – March 12, 2016) was a Bangladeshi poet, editor and writer. He is credited with 45 collections of poetry including Prakriti O Premer Kabita, Asambhaber Paye, Sahasra Sundar, Haturir Nichae Jiban, Khub Beshi Durea Noy, Khamakaro Bahaman Hey Udar Amiyo Batas and others. He is most well known for his poem "Bhaat De Haramjada" (Give me rice, bastard) which was written during the famine of 1974. The poet participated in the war against Pakistani forces in the Bangladesh Liberation War of 1971 and was awarded ‘Notable Freedom Fighter Award' in 1997. He received Bangla Academy Literary Award in 1984 and national award Ekushey Padak in 2013 for his contribution to Bangla language and literature.

== Early life and education ==
Azad was born on February 14, 1941, in the remote village of Guni of Ghatail Upazila in Tangail District, a central region of Bangladesh. He was the youngest of three children of Salimuddin Khan and Rabeya Khan. He earned his bachelor's and master's in Bengali literature from University of Dhaka in 1965 and 1967, respectively.

== Career ==
=== Literary ===
Azad was widely regarded as one of the most prolific young poets in the post-Liberation War period. He had 45 books to his credit, including an autobiography. His first book of poetry, Ashombhober Paye, was published in 1973. Since then, he had experimented with language and poetic form, where surrealistic approach was conspicuous.

He described himself as a 'lover of humans, nature and romance'. He depicted love, romance, poverty, sufferings, injustice, urban and rural life through his poems. Many of his love poems, including 'He Doroja' and 'Bhalobashar Shonga' (Definition of Love), have been used and quoted many times in movies, TV dramas and other media in Bangladesh. He became widely famous when his controversial poem "Bhaat De Haramjada" was published in 1974. At the time, the country was going through its worst famine. It was an angry poem about a starving man lashing out in impotent rage- "Bhat De Haramzada, Noile Manchitro Khabo" ("give me food, bastard! Or I will engulf your map, your geography!"). The indication was -if the newly independent country cannot even feed its own people, then what good is the liberation? The poet quickly became the center of a controversy. The Sheikh Mujib administration found the poem to be incendiary and an attack on the ruling party, while his readership hailed it as a rebellious and courageous outburst. In an attempt to settle the debate, Azad explained to the administration, by writing a long analysis of how his poem only reflected the great literary tradition of Bengal and the poem intended no animosity toward the government.

=== Professional ===
Throughout his professional life, spanning 50 years, Azad had many roles. He began his career as a lecturer in Government Maulana Mohammad Ali College in Tangail in the late 1960s. The year 1971, changed the course of the poet's life, as he traded his pen with a wooden rifle. After March 25th crackdown by Pakistani Military, Azad joined Kader Siddique's 'Kaderia Bahini', a civilian guerrilla force, to fight against the occupying army in the Liberation War. He soon received the necessary arms and equipment from the treasury, provided by then finance secretary Khondokar Asaduzzaman.

He joined Bangla Academy in 1972 and worked there until 1984, as the executive editor of Uttaradhikar, a monthly magazine. He was also the editor of Robbaar, another popular weekly in 1980s. Azad was the director of National Book Center (Jatiyo Grontho Kendro) of Bangladesh for many years. He briefly served as the deputy general manager of BJMC (Bangladesh Jute Mills Corporation). Azad returned to Bangla Academy in 1995, for a brief period, to help assist the 'Young Writers Project', taking up the role of poetics instructor. Later he went back to teaching and became a visiting professor of literature at Jahangirnagar University in Savar. In the recent years, he had been working in a daily called Amader Shomoy.

== Personal life and death ==
Azad married Adila Bakul in 1969, sister of future sub-commander of Kader Bahini, Anwar Ul Alam Shaheed, and together they had four children - Lopa, Rahul, Deepita and Rajeev. In 1983, the couple separated and later that year he married Dilara Hafiz. Together, they had two sons, Ovinna and Obyoy. Azad suffered a stroke in January 2016 and remained hospitalized for almost 8 weeks. He died on March 12, 2016 in Dhaka. His body was entombed in Martyred Intellectuals' Cemetery in Mirpur.

== Books ==
- Asombhaber Payae
- Semabadha Jalae, Simito Shobuja
- Ekjibona
- Haturier Nichae Jibon
- Porikirno Panchala Amer Swadesh
- Khub Bashi Durea Nay
- Khamakaro Bahoman Hay Udar Omiyo Batas
- Karo Ashuro Pat
- Pagolar Thekay Pramikar Chiti
- Apar Arannya
- Moulobir Mon Bholo Nay
- Priyo Shareegulo
- Poems on Love Environment and Other Difficulties

== Awards ==
- Kobitalap Award (1979)
- Alaol Literary Award (1981)
- Bangla Academy Literary Award (1981)
- Suhrit Literary Award (1989)
- Poet Ahsan Habib Award (1991)
- Poet Hasan Hafizur Rahman Award (1996)
- Notable Freedom Fighter Award (1997)
- Ekushey Padak (2013)
