= Badhan (organization) =

Bangladeshi voluntary blood donation organization

- বাঁধন
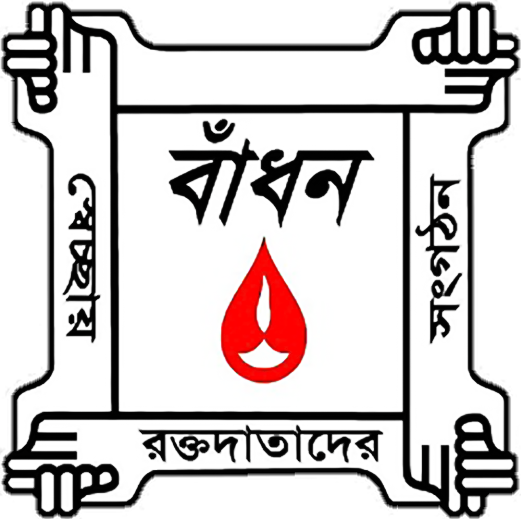
- Formation: 24 October 1997
- Founded at: University of Dhaka
- Type: Blood donation organization
- Registration no.: DHA-06152
- Legal status: Voluntary organization
- Purpose: Free blood donation
- Headquarters: Teacher-Student Centre
- Location: Dhaka, Bangladesh
- Official language: Bengali
- President: SM Kamruzzaman Kafi
- General Secretary: Ahmed Reza Junaid
- Volunteers: 64,000
- Website: https://badhan.org/

Badhan is a voluntary blood donation organization in Bangladesh. It was founded in October 1997. It has supplied over a million bags of blood and determined the blood groups of over 2 million people. The organization operates a blood transfusion center and a foundation.

== Description ==
Badhan is a service-oriented voluntary blood donation organization in Bangladesh. Currently, it operates across 55 districts in the country through 83 educational institutions, 16 zones, 148 units, and 14 families. The organization's vision is to create a society where thousands of undergraduate and postgraduate students are always ready to donate blood promptly for patients, thereby striving to save countless endangered lives. Since its inception, it has worked with its own spirit and ideals despite numerous challenges.

The organization is a completely non-political, non-communal, non-regional, non-ethnic, secular, and voluntary social organization.

Former vice-chancellor of the University of Dhaka and emeritus professor A. K. Azad Chowdhury said about Badhan,

Badhan is an organization that the country can take pride in. The way this student-led organization continues its work entirely on voluntary effort is undoubtedly commendable.

The organization has its own app. The Badhan app already includes information on approximately 64,000 blood donors from 58 districts of the country, with this number growing daily. All 64,000 of these willing blood donors are students from universities and colleges.

== History ==
Badhan originated in 1996 at the University of Dhaka. A residential student of Shahidullah Hall and a member of the Biochemistry Department, Muhammad Shahidul Islam, was approached by a student from Sergeant Zahurul Haq Hall, who mentioned that 10-12 bags of blood were needed for a relative's heart surgery. Collecting such an amount of blood quickly was difficult at that time.

Facing this challenge, Shahidul Islam realized that a hall-based blood collection system could ensure timely access to needed blood. After discussions with friends and seniors in Room 307, he founded the voluntary organization Badhan in 1997. Initially, Badhan was centered around Shahidullah Hall.

Within five months, Badhan spread to Fazlul Huq Muslim Hall. Subsequently, units began operating in nearly one hall every week. A slogan was also established for the organization: "One's blood is another's life; let blood be the bond of the soul".

As of 2025, Badhan, the voluntary blood donors' organization, has supplied approximately 1.12 million bags of pure blood. Simultaneously, it has successfully determined the blood groups of 2.436 million people free of charge.

== Programs ==
Programs aimed at encouraging students and the younger generation in Bangladesh to donate blood voluntarily include offering free blood group testing Within 2019, Badhan has helped some 1,99,974 people to determine their blood groups. These initiatives promote voluntary blood donation to support patients in need and motivate individuals to participate in service and awareness campaigns. Additionally, efforts are undertaken to conduct relief and rehabilitation programs to address the impacts of natural and human-made disasters.

== BADHAN Transfusion Center ==
With financial assistance from Spandanbee, USA, the Badhan Blood Circulation Center began as an experimental blood circulation center on 2 September 2006. Later, on 24 October 2019, the Badhan Blood Circulation Center was officially inaugurated. The inauguration ceremony was attended by the then vice-chancellor of the University of Dhaka, Md. Akhtaruzzaman.

== Badhan Foundation ==
Badhan Foundation was established in 2006 with former members of Badhan. However, for various reasons, the foundation could not play an effective role at that time. Later, in 2014, its activities were resumed, and in 2015, a full-fledged committee was formed. The primary purpose of the Badhan Foundation is to assist in achieving Badhan's core objectives, as well as to operate and support the blood circulation center.

This organization also conducts activities such as providing primary medical assistance to rural and underprivileged communities, maternal and child healthcare, vaccination, nutrition, health training, establishment of hospitals and charitable clinics, distribution of free medicines, and training of nurses. In addition, it implements special programs for people with physical and mental disabilities, raises awareness about AIDS and sexually transmitted diseases, provides primary healthcare, health education, sanitation, diarrhea prevention, and implements free projects like EPI (Expanded Program on Immunization).

== Organograms ==
The entire organization is divided into zones, which work independently under the central Badhan. Each zone is subdivided into multiple units. Each unit has a zonal representative and zone has a central representative who mainly maintains the relation of the hierarchy.

- Central
  - Dhaka University Zone
  - Bangladesh University of Engineering and Technology Zone
  - Bangladesh Agricultural University Zone
  - Jahangirnagar University Zone
  - Rajshahi University Zone
  - Dhaka City Zone
  - Rajshahi Zone
  - Rangpur Zone
  - Padma Zone
  - Bogura Zone
  - Barishal Zone
  - Khulna Zone
  - Mymensingh Zone
  - Chattogram Zone
  - Sylhet Zone

== See also ==
- Sandhani
- Bangladesh Red Crescent Society
- Blood donation in Bangladesh
