= Hunger in Bangladesh =

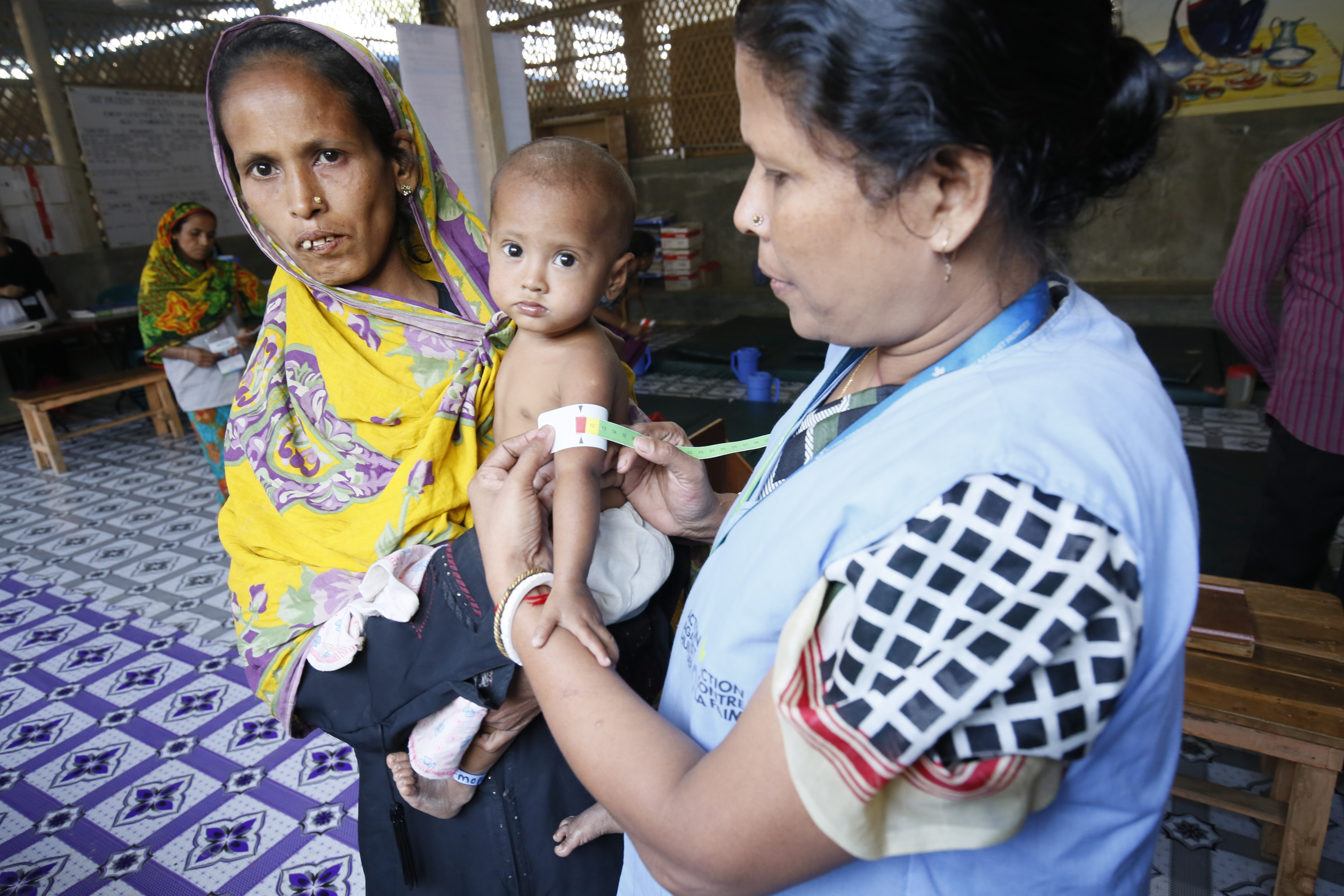
Child in Bangladesh being assessed for severe malnutrition

Hunger is one of the major issues affecting the citizens of Bangladesh. Around 40% of the nation's population suffers from various degrees of hunger, primarily falling under three categories: acute hunger, starvation and chronic hunger.

Bangladesh is one of the most densely populated countries in the world and is home to more than 173 million people (as of 2024). It has developed considerably according to the Human Development Index, particularly in the areas of literacy and life expectancy. However, its economic inequality has increased, as about 32% of the population still lives in extreme poverty. The country faces significant hunger with approximately 40 million people being close to starvation. Fortunately, poverty has decreased considerably since 2010, falling from 49% to 18.7% in 2022. In 2025, the Global Hunger Index rated hunger in Bangladesh at Moderate (19.2). This rating was based on 10.4% of the population being undernourished (insufficient calories), 25.1% of children under 5 having stunted height, 0.7% being wasted (low weight for their height) and 3.1% of children dying before their 3rd birthday. All four indices improved between 2000 and 2025.

== History ==
Following the Bangladesh Liberation War in 1971, the country was faced with a multitude of physical and economic problems. Its economy was waning, and it had to fix the damaged infrastructure caused by the war. In 1974, Bangladesh was hit by an intense monsoon that damaged much of the crops produced that year. The monsoon, paired with the fragile economy and government mismanagement, caused a devastating famine throughout the country.

During the 1974 famine, the United States intervened by pressuring Bangladeshi politicians to provide aid for agricultural producers, and by sending food aid to the population.

Hunger has remained over the years, but Bangladesh has reduced its effect over time. There were downturns in the availability of food, particularly during the late 1970s, although the early 2000s were also challenging. During this famine, many farmers lacked the knowledge to grow food on land with low nutrients due to aggressive farming.

== Causes ==
Factors that contribute to the hunger crisis across the states of Bangladesh include a lack of resources and education.

Food insecurity in Bangladesh is derived from extreme poverty due to underemployment, unemployment, inadequate access to land for cultivation, social exclusion and natural disasters. In these endangered, poor populations, women and children are most affected by malnutrition.

According to Asia Times, food waste is a cause; across Bangladesh approximately 5% of food is wasted each year. Food waste is particularly severe during Bangladesh's winter wedding season, which produces "tons of food wastage." Families of the bride and groom are expected to produce lavish meals, and the lack of RSVPs means caterers can't easily plan for guest numbers, so much of the food goes directly into waste bins.

=== Climate change ===
From 1990 to 2010, floods, droughts and hurricanes increasingly caused major economic losses and livelihood damage in Bangladesh. Agriculture is a major industry that accounts for nearly 20% of GDP and 65% of the labor force, and faces huge risks. Bangladesh's agriculture relies heavily on the conditions of the annual floods. The World Bank recognizes that large-scale floods, which occur infrequently, can have catastrophic effects. Climate change is expected to reduce the output of rice, Bangladesh's main crop, and increase the country's dependence on other crops and imported grains. On the whole, due to climate change, Bangladesh's agricultural GDP is expected to decline by 3.1% per year. These changes will not only affect the agricultural sector but also the civilian sector, including household consumption.

== Consequences ==
There are many consequences of hunger in Bangladesh, namely malnutrition, undernutrition in children, child stunting, and child wasting. Child stunting is defined as a child being two standard deviations lower than average height for age, and child wasting is a child who is two standard deviations lower than average weight for height. Data from 2008–2012 shows that being moderately underweight occurred in 36.4% of cases, while stunting was at 41.3%, and wasting at 15.6%.

Food availability with limited food variability can lead to a misperception that hunger is minimized in a population. Micronutrient deficiency leads to hidden hunger, the perception that a population is not food insecure. A diet with enough calories from rice but lacking in protein, vitamins, and micronutrients (as in parts of Bangladesh) is hidden hunger.

About 24% of women have reduced weight and 13% are short of stature, which significantly increases the likelihood that their children are growth retarded.

According to the Global Report on Food Crises 2025, Bangladesh was among ten countries accounting for two-third of people facing acute food insecurity, alongside Pakistan, Myanmar, Afghanistan, DR Congo, Syria, Yemen, South Sudan and Sudan.

There has been a decline of 7.6 million people facing severe food insecurity in Bangladesh since 2024, yet 16 million people continue to be affected by food insecurity at or above crisis-level. Areas where Rohingya refugees have settled have been subject to higher acute food insecurity. The report noted that progress is fragile and dependent upon external support.

== Demographics ==
Hunger among the middle and lower class populations of Bangladesh is growing at a fast rate compared to other South Asian countries. Of the 50 million people experiencing food insecurity in Bangladesh, less than half have access to food security network programs. Sacrifices by adults in food consumption for the good of children, particularly in moments of scarcity, is highly disseminated. In most cases, it is an adult or teenage woman who has to make a sacrifice. The disproportionate poverty aimed at women and children comes due to discrimination and traditions of exclusion, leaving them the most vulnerable.

=== Children ===
Bangladesh has the highest rate of underweight children among all countries in Southern Asia. One of each two children under five is detained or stunted chronically, and 14% suffer from acute waste. WHO estimates two in three deaths under five are caused by malnutrition. About 25% of children's diets complies with food varieties standards in which a minimum of four out of seven food groups is consumed every day.

The Food Security Nutritional Surveillance Project conducted studies in vulnerable zones: the coastal belt, eastern hills, Haor Region, Padma Chars, and Northern Chars. In total there were 14,712 children from six to fifty-nine months of age who suffered from food insecurity. A majority of the children who suffer from hunger live in rural areas making up 94% of the experiment.

=== Gender disparities ===
In Bangladesh, women are still discriminated against and are seen as inferior to their male counterparts. In certain households, some members have reduced access to food because of gender preferences. In small villages where males are held to different standards, parents prioritize feeding their sons over their daughters.

The gender of the head of the household has a great impact in regards to food consumption; a household in which the breadwinner is female is correlated with the household having less food. While 65% of the households suffering from hunger had a woman as head of the house, 35% were headed by men. Women make up 32% of the individuals under the poverty line. In some cases, if the women in the household are educated, it reduces their chance of starvation by 43%.

In recent years women have mobilized, attempting to reverse this trend. Women in Bangladesh have arranged an organization comprising a total of 145,000 women in order to fight chronic hunger. Their goal is to reduce the number of uneducated women and promote self-value, as well as to show that women are just as capable of providing for their household. Uneducated women are prone to earning less than the average rate for women. Overall, these women are trying to eradicate chronic hunger among their children.

== Regional differences ==
Seasonal hunger is known as "monga" in some rural areas of Bangladesh, specifically in the northwest. This region, also referred to as the Greater Rangpur Region, relies on a select few major rice crops. This limited number of crops only covers nine months out of the year, leaving the people of this region with an extreme food shortage for the months of September to November. A second, lesser "monga" happens annually a few months before the main and more damaging "monga" in the latter half of each year. The lesser "monga" lasts for roughly a month, occurring from mid-April to mid-March.

== Statistics ==
=== Historical data ===
The population below the minimum level of energy consumption in the diet (also known as the prevalence of undernourishment) shows the percentage of the population whose food intake is insufficient to continuously meet the requirements of food energy. The data shown as five represents a prevalence of undernourishment less than 5%.

Bangladesh Hunger Statistics
Year	% of Population	Annual Change
2018	13.00%	−0.50%
2017	13.50%	−0.60%
2016	14.10%	−0.80%
2015	14.90%	0.40%
2014	14.50%	0.30%
2013	14.20%	0.40%
2012	13.80%	−0.10%
2011	13.90%	0.10%
2010	13.80%	−0.10%
2009	13.90%	0.20%
2008	13.70%	−0.30%
2007	14.00%	0.10%
2006	13.90%	−0.40%
2005	14.30%	−0.20%
2004	14.50%	−0.50%
2003	15.00%	−0.20%
2002	15.20%	−0.80%
2001	16.00%	−0.80%

=== Global Hunger Index ===
The Global Hunger Index (GHI) is a system that measures hunger globally, regionally, and by country. It combines four component indicators: the proportion of the undernourished as a percentage of the population, the proportion of children under the age of five suffering from wasting, the proportion of children under the age of five suffering from stunting, and the mortality rate of children under the age of five. In the 2020 GHI, Bangladesh was ranked as the 75th out of 107 countries. Bangladesh scores 20.4, which, according to severity scale, means that the severity of hunger is "serious".

GHI INDICATOR VALUES FOR DIVISIONS, BANGLADESH
Division	Child stunting (%)	Child wasting (%)	Child mortality (%)
Barisal	39.9	17.7	3.5
Chittagong	38.0	15.6	5.0
Dhaka	33.9	11.9	4.1
Khulna	28.1	13.5	5.6
Rajshahi	31.1	17.3	4.3
Rangpur	36.0	17.7	3.9
Sylhet	49.6	12.1	6.7
Total	36.1	14.3	4.6

Indicator	Severity scale
GHI	≥50: extremely alarming 35–49.9: alarming 20–34.9: serious 10–19.9: moderate ≤9.9: low

== See also ==
- Valo Kajer Hotel
