= Poverty in Bangladesh =

Bangladesh is a developing country nation. Despite rapid economic growth, poverty remains a major issue, although it has declined sharply in recent history. Shortly after its independence, approximately 90% of the population lived under the poverty line. Economic reforms and trade liberalization of early 1990s, along with accelerated economic growth since early-2000s, have resulted in progress in reducing poverty, being recognized by international institutions. According to World Bank, more than 33 million Bangladeshi people have been lifted out of poverty since 2000; as measured by the percentage of people living on the equivalent of US$1.90 or less per day in 2011 purchasing price parity terms.

Since the early-2000s, rapid economic growth has fueled a significant increase in per-capita income. Bangladesh's per capita has increased almost threefold between 2010 and 2020, from under $700 to $2,068 (the highest GDP per capita in South Asia) moving Bangladesh into the ranks of middle-income economy. At its current growth, Bangladesh is projected to enter upper-middle income status by 2041, although this rate of growth may not be sustainable.

Based on the current rate of poverty reduction, Bangladesh is projected to eradicate extreme poverty by 2031, as outlined in its Eighth Five-Year Plan (2020–2025) and supported by reports from organizations such as the World Bank and the Asian Development Bank. However, poverty levels have decreased by less than half a percent in 2017 to 2019, half it's prior rate.

Bangladesh has exhibited accomplishments in poverty reduction, ensuring food security, enhancing primary education, reducing mortality ratios, expanding immunization coverage, and effectively addressing communicable diseases.

== General overview of Bangladesh ==
Bangladesh's economic reform started with the implementation of investment friendly economic policies, privatization of public industries, budgetary discipline, and liberalization of trade. Since then, Bangladesh has been among the fastest growing economies in the world, exceeding 6 percent growth annually between 2004 and 2015. The GDP growth further accelerated exceeding 7 percent mark since then, and is projected to gradually exceed 10 percent growth until 2020.

Among Bangladesh's many economic and social achievements, dramatic reduction in poverty in often considered a phenomenon among international organizations such as IMF and The World Bank. Between 1972 and 2018, Bangladesh's population living on less than $1.90/day is estimated to have fallen from 90% to 9%. Between 2008 and 2018, The per capita income in the country increased 149%.

As of 2020, female labour force participation rate stands at 50%, while net female school enrollment rate stands at a staggering 98%. World Economic Forum ranks Bangladesh as the most gender-equal nation in South Asia (ranked 47th, followed by Maldives 106th; India 108th).

=== Bangladesh National Poverty Line ===
Percentage of population living below the NATIONAL POVERTY LINE in Bangladesh

Source: World Bank and Bangladesh Bureau of Statistics (BBS)

=== Poverty rate by division ===
Percent of population living on less than $2.15, $3.65 and $6.85 a day, international dollars (2017 PPP) as per the World Bank:

Percent of population living on less than poverty thresholds
Division	$2.15	$3.65	$6.85	Year
Rajshahi	15.2%	58.5%	92.7%	2016
Chittagong	5.5%	37.4%	84.2%	2016
Dhaka	6.5%	33.9%	76.2%	2016
Khulna	16.5%	65.1%	93.1%	2016
Rajshahi	17.8%	63.5%	91.9%	2016
Rangpur	35.4%	77.7%	95.2%	2016
Sylhet	13.2%	57.7%	90.4%	2016
Bangladesh	13.5%	51.6%	86.9%	2016

== Rural and urban poverty ==
Strong national poverty reduction masks the differences in welfare trends between rural and urban Bangladesh. The national poverty rate fell in both rural and urban areas, but the speed of reduction was much slower in urban Bangladesh, largely because of slower rates of poverty reduction in Dhaka and increasing poverty in Chittagong. There was no progress in reducing extreme poverty in urban areas: the proportion of the urban population living in extreme poverty was 7.7 percent in 2010 and 7.6 percent in 2016. Given that Bangladesh continued to urbanize during this time, there are now more people living in extreme poverty in urban Bangladesh (3.3 million) than in 2010 (3 million). Since independence the average rate of urbanization in Bangladesh is 5% (World Bank 2012), while the percentage share of urban population has doubled, from 15% in 1974 to 28.4% in 2011.

=== Rural poverty ===
Many people live in remote areas that lack services such as education, health clinics, and adequate roads, particularly road links to markets. An estimated 35 percent of the population in rural areas lives below the poverty line. They suffer from persistent food insecurity, own no land and assets, are often uneducated, and may also suffer serious illnesses or disabilities. Another 29 percent of the rural population is considered moderately poor. Though they may own a small plot of land and some livestock and generally have enough to eat, their diets lack nutritional value. As a result of health problems or natural disasters, they are at risk of sliding deeper into poverty. Women are among the poorest of the rural poor, especially when they are the sole heads of their households. They suffer from discrimination and have few earning opportunities, and their nutritional intake is often inadequate.

=== Urban poverty ===
An estimated 21 percent of the population in urban areas lives below the poverty line. People living in urban areas, like Sylhet, Dhaka, Chittagong, Khulna, and Rajshahi, enjoy a better standard of living, with electricity, gas, and clean water supplies. Even in the major cities, however, "a significant proportion of Bangladeshis live in squalor in dwellings that fall apart during the monsoon season and have no regular electricity. These Bangladeshis have limited access to health care and to clean drinking water."

Urban poverty in Bangladesh remains notably large, with nearly 19 percent of the urban population grappling with economic hardship. This figure, both in absolute terms and concerning the broader South Asian context, stands out as high — second only to Afghanistan in the realm of urban poverty rates (Ellis and Roberts 2015). Urban households confront an array of vulnerabilities, making them prone to regress into poverty or face further entrenchment. These vulnerabilities encompass substandard housing, precarious living conditions, and limited access to basic services such as education, electricity, health, and nutrition. The collective impact of these vulnerabilities manifests in urban areas, where the prevalence of severe stunting among children under the age of 5 is 8 percentage points higher compared to rural regions. Unfortunately, there is a dearth of mechanisms enabling households to effectively mitigate risks or cope with the aftermath of various shocks.

=== Causes of rural and urban poverty ===
One of the biggest causes of rural poverty is the fast-growing population rate. It places huge pressure on the environment, causing problems such as erosion and flooding, which in turn leads to low agricultural productivity.

The causes of urban poverty are due to the limited employment opportunities, degraded environment, bad housing and sanitation. The urban poor hold jobs that are labour demanding, thus affecting their health conditions and making it difficult to escape poverty.

Recent population growth has contributed to an escalating poverty rate in Bangladesh, with the country experiencing a yearly increase of 1 million people. Roughly two-thirds of Bangladesh's land lies at an elevation of five meters or less, exposing over 165 million people to the risks of natural disasters like cyclones, floods, earthquakes, and landslides. The resulting environmental conflicts significantly impact the country's economic conditions, with close to $6.5 billion lost annually due to environmental degradation, equivalent to 3.4 percent of Bangladesh's GDP. Air and water pollution are major contributors to the country's health challenges, causing nearly 28 percent of deaths. According to the Environmental Performance Index (EPI) report, Bangladesh ranks 162nd out of 180 as one of the most polluted countries.

Over the past two decades, Bangladesh has consistently held the seventh position globally in vulnerability to extreme weather events, as indicated by the Global Climate Risk Index. The sea level rise in the upcoming years could result in the displacement of an estimated 15 to 30 million Bangladeshis from coastal areas. A U.S. government report in 2018 highlighted that 90 million, equivalent to 56 percent of the population, live in regions characterized by "high climate exposure," with 53 million experiencing "very high" exposure. The 2021 Children's Climate Risk Index from the United Nations Children's Fund characterizes the climate risk for children in Bangladesh as "extremely high," signifying the most severe rating on the index.

== Environmental problems and poverty ==
With 80% of the country situated on the flood plains of the Ganges, Brahmaputra, Meghna and those of several other minor rivers, the country is prone to severe flooding.

While some flooding is beneficial to agriculture, high levels of flooding have been found to be a retardant on agricultural growth. On average, 16% of household income per year is lost due to flooding, with roughly 89% of the loss in property and assets. Of these, households engaged in farming and fishing suffer a greater loss relative to income.

A positive relationship exists between flood risk and poverty as measured by household income, with people living under the poverty threshold facing a higher risk of flooding, as measured by their proximity to rivers and flood depth. Property prices also tend to be lower the higher the risk of flooding, making it more likely that someone who lives in a flood-prone area is poor and vice versa, as they might not be able to afford safer accommodation. Also, they tend to depend solely or largely on crop cultivation and fisheries for their livelihood and thus are harder hit by floods relative to their income.

Important to the finances of farmers operating small farms is their self-sufficiency in rice and floods adversely affect this factor, destroying harvests and arable land. Farmers hit by flooding are often forced to undertake distressed land selling and in doing so, risk being pushed into or deeper into poverty. In areas hard hit by floods, especially disaster floods such as the 1988 flood, several researchers have found that many of the affected households have resorted to selling off assets such as land and livestock to mitigate losses.

In an area hard-hit by poverty and prone to floods, it was found that many of the poor were unwilling to pay for flood protection. The main reason cited had been lack of financial resources, although it was found that many of these people are willing to substitute non-financial means of payment such as labour, harvest or part of their land

The above is problematic as it creates a vicious cycle for the poor of Bangladesh. Because the poor may not be able to afford safer housing, they have to live near the river which raises their risk of flooding. This would result in greater damage suffered from the floods, driving the poor into selling assets and pushing them further into poverty. They would be further deprived of sufficient resources needed to prevent extensive damage from flooding, resulting in even more flood damage and poverty. It then becomes even harder to escape this cycle. Even those farmers slightly above the poverty line are but just one bad flood away from the ranks of the poor.

== Government actions to reduce poverty ==
The Bengali government put out economic programs and reforms in the late 1900s to reduce the poverty levels, however the poverty levels have decreased by less than half a percent in 2017 to 2019 in comparison to the steady 1 percent decrease in poverty the years before. As of February 2020, poverty was in fact increasing in several countries, while many others were already off track to achieving Sustainable Development Goal 1. One significant drawback in the government's economic policies and programs aimed at poverty alleviation is their exclusive focus on lifting people out of extreme poverty to surpass the poverty line. There is a notable absence of support to ensure that people not only escape poverty but also sustain their economic status while building resilience against potential future challenges such as climate-related issues, diseases, and economic shocks. One promising concept, the Graduation approach, is a time-bound series of interventions designed to address the various factors contributing to extreme poverty. This method, extensively studied and commonly employed, offers a systematic way to break free from the poverty cycle and gradually transition into a financially sustainable job. Despite receiving significant help from organizations such as the IDA and the World Bank's funding and support, the economic sustainability will not last long nor be as effective, indicating a need for approaches such as the "big push" economic method in order to reestablish sufficiency.

== Implications of poverty in Bangladesh ==
The Gross national income (GNI) per capita measured in 2008 prices is a staggering low of US$520 while GNI Purchasing Power Parity per capita is US$1440 (2008). This is a dismal figure when compared to other developed economies. Even though the poverty rate in Bangladesh has been decreasing, it is doing so at a slow rate of less than 2% per year. Poverty matters because it affects many factors of growth – education, population growth rates, health of the workforce and public policy. Poverty is most concentrated in the rural areas of Bangladesh, hence creating disparities between the rural and urban areas. However, urban poverty remains a problem too.

In particular, poverty has been linked strongly to education and employment. Research papers published by the Bangladesh Institute of Development Studies (BIDS) have shown that poverty acts as both a cause and effect of a lack of education, which in turn adversely affects employment opportunities. Having an unskilled workforce also greatly decreases the productivity of the workforce which decreases the appeal of Foreign Direct Investments (FDIs) and thus impedes sustainable economic growth. In essence, education is an important contribution to the social and economic development of a country.

Secondly, rising landlessness is also a consequence of poverty in Bangladesh. In the year 2000, among the poorest 20 percent of the population – four out of five owned less than half an acre of land. Not only did many own no acreage at all, but landlessness has been increasing in rural Bangladesh along with the number of small and marginal farms. The 2000 HIES found nearly half (48 percent) of the country's rural population to be effectively landless, owning at most 0.05 acres. Roughly three-fifths of all households in the two poorest quintiles fell into that category.

Third, for the chronic poor, issues such as food security and health hamper social mobility. According to a study done by the World Bank on Dhaka, the poor suffers from a lack of proper healthcare in their areas due to the expensive and poor quality health care services. The poverty stricken areas either do not have the available facilities, or can only afford low quality healthcare. This is a problem that is common in both the rural and urban poor. For the urban poor, the problem has worsened as they can only afford to stay in slums where there are problems of overcrowding and unhygienic living conditions. These two factors results in the spread of diseases amongst the poor whom cannot afford better healthcare. Also, one cannot deny that a healthy and well-fed citizen is better suited for increased productivity as part of the workforce. Thus, poverty matters because it consequences the social welfare of citizens. Finance minister AHM Mustafa Kamal on Sunday said Bangladesh will be a hunger and poverty free country within the next decade, reports UNB.

Lastly, the rise in child marriage in Bangladesh is closely linked to persistent poverty and structural inequality. According to the 2025 United Nations Population Fund report, 51% of Bangladeshi girls are married before the age of 18—the highest rate in South Asia—compared to 29% in Afghanistan and 18% in Pakistan. Rasheda K. Chowdhury, social activist and executive director of the Campaign for Popular Education, stated that "poverty is the primary driver of early marriages, as many guardians are unable to cope with household expenses." Despite having the highest rate of girls' enrollment in secondary school in the region, limited access to education in rural areas and inadequate investment in human development remain significant barriers. Azizul Haque of World Vision Bangladesh noted that in remote communities, "girls are mostly considered a burden for the family," and early marriage becomes a perceived financial solution, especially after girls complete eighth grade, beyond which no local schooling is available. Both Chowdhury and Haque emphasized the lack of social awareness and community engagement, warning that "the government alone cannot act as a watchdog in every household."

== See also ==
- List of companies of Bangladesh
- Bangladesh Academy for Rural Development
- Bangladeshi RMG Sector
- Leather industry in Bangladesh
- Executive Magistrate of Bangladesh
- Index of Bangladesh-related articles
- 3G (countries)
- List of slums in Bangladesh
