= Bengal famine =

There have been several significant famines in the history of Bengal (now independent Bangladesh and the Indian state of West Bengal) including:

Bengal famine may refer to:

- Great Bengal famine of 1770
- Bengal famine of 1873–1874
- Bengal famine of 1943
- Bangladesh famine of 1974

== See also ==
- Famine in India
