= Bhat De Haramzada, Noile Manchitro Khabo =

1974 poem by Rafiq Azad

- by Rafiq Azad
- Original title: ভাত দে হারামজাদা, নইলে মানচিত্র খাবো
- Country: Bangladesh
- Language: Bengali
- Series: Simaboddho Jole, Simito Sobuje
- Subject: Bangladesh famine of 1974
- Genre: Prose poetry
- Publisher: Priyomukh
- Publication date: 1974
- Lines: 33

"Bhat De Haramzada, Noile Manchitro Khabo" (lit. 'Give me food, bastard! Or I will engulf your map') is a Bengali-language Bangladeshi poem written by Rafiq Azad. It is included in his poetry book Simaboddho Jole, Simito Sobuje. Its subject is Bangladesh famine of 1974 that was the cause of food shortage in Bangladesh. After the poem's publication, rumors spread that it was written with then-prime minister Sheikh Mujibur Rahman in mind. It has 33 rhythmic lines.

== Background ==
In 1974, three years after Bangladesh's independence, a famine occurred due to rampant corruption that resulted in food shortages in the country at that time. At that time, Aftab Ahmed, a journalist of The Daily Ittefaq, took photo of one person wearing a net and published it in the newspaper on 11 September 1974. He also took photos of another person eating vomit and published that in the newspaper. After seeing the photos, poet Rafiq Azad became angry and composed the poem. (Note: The poet said in an interview that the context in which the poem was written was wrong. He was unaware of the fact that the journalist was acting in order to gain popularity and to force another person to vomit for ৳100. As a result, he wrote the poem from a wrong observation without knowing the matter. The poet questions why the BNP or its like-minded parties are listening to the previous words of the poet but not listening to the latter, i.e. the mistake of the poet's point of view.) The poem was published in Simaboddho Jole, Simito Sobuje, which was banned by the-then government for the poem. The poem garnered Azad enemies. Azad then went into hiding. At that time, rumors spread that the poem was written with then-prime minister Sheikh Mujibur Rahman in mind. Azad's family became anxious out of fear of legal consequences. Consequently, Azad's brother-in-law, Anwar Ul Alam, Deputy Director of the Jatiya Rakkhi Bahini, took him to the prime minister. Even though the then prime minister Sheikh Mujibur Rahman did not tell him anything, Rafiq Azad had to submit the reason for writing the poem to the Deputy inspector general of police in written form as an accountability at the Special Branch office.

== Themes ==
The main theme of the poem is the Bangladesh famine of 1974, which Azad highlighted. Columnist Aktar Hosen posited that Azad blamed Sheikh Mujibur Rahman for the famine and called him "Haramzada". However, according to professor Soumitra Sekhar Dey, the poem does not blame Rahman but hostile "powers who artificially wanted to destroy Bangladesh".

== Analysis ==
As a prose poem, open syllable and blank verse forms are used here. This is an informal poem in nature.

== Reception ==
Humayun Azad called the poem Rafiq Azad's "fury expressed in slang". Imdadul Haq Milan said of the poem, "Rafiq Azad was a[n] imperious freedom fighter. He was the assistant of Kader Siddique. He was a follower of Bangabandhu Sheikh Mujibur Rahman. He shook the country by writing the poem during the famine of the 1974..." According to poet Ashim Saha, the poem was then used politically and caused embarrassment to Sheikh Mujibur Rahman and his government. According to writer Zakir Talukder, despite being a blind devotee of Sheikh Mujibur Rahman, regular irregularities by the government during the famine forced Azad to write the poem. According to Rizwan Kabir, Azad emphasized the importance of economic freedom along with political freedom by highlighting the freedom aspect of basic human needs by expressing aggressive attitude in the poem. Antara Biswas compared the poem with "Bidrohi" by Kazi Nazrul Islam and said that although Azad is a symbol of the middle class, the character of the hungry people has emerged in the poem.

According to writer Farid Ahmad Dulal, although Azad was originally a fantasy poet, he became popular by writing this rebellious poem. According to Ahmed Munir, Rafiq Azad became known to common readers because of this poem. Alat Ehsan said of the poem "Such intense lines are rare in the history of poetry in any language of the earth, which modify the map of poetry, teaches us to think". According to Fazlul Haque Saikat, the poem reflects the emotions of the famine-stricken people of independent Bangladesh, juxtaposing material deprivation against the ideals of independence.

== Politics ==
In the 1970s, this poem was popular with Maoist politician Siraj Sikder, founder of Proletarian Party of East Bengal, and the members of National Socialist Party. In 2020, A. F. M. Azizul Islam Pikul, former mayor of Nandail municipality, mentioned the poem on social media in the context of Sheikh Mujibur Rahman's birth centenary celebrations by the fourth Hasina ministry, commemorating the death of people due to 1974 famine during Rahman's premiership and accused Rahman's daughter, Sheikh Hasina, of dictatorship who was the prime minister that time. As a result, Pikul's views created controversies and he was arrested by the police. In 2023, Rumeen Farhana, politician of Bangladesh Nationalist Party, wrote that no one has the courage to write such a poem present day.
