= Blood donation in Bangladesh =

Blood donation in Bangladesh is an activity conducted by several different organisations in the country of Bangladesh. As of 2011, about 25% of the nation's blood supply came from voluntary donation, 20–25% from paid donors, and 50–55% from one-time donation for a specific patient.

== Background ==
Blood transfusion service became available in Bangladesh at the Dhaka Medical College Hospital in 1950. Professional blood donors were the mainstay of blood donation in Bangladesh, with 47% of donated blood coming from professional donors as late as the year 2000. The potential for contamination in the supply, and the need for volunteer donors was well recognised. An estimate from 2011 is that of the 500,000 units of blood required annually, only 25% come from voluntary donation, 20–25% from paid donors, and 50–55% from one-time donation for a specific patient.

== Organisations ==
=== Medicine Club ===
Medicine Club is a non-profit humanitarian organization in Bangladesh volunteered by medical and dental students. The organization was founded on 31 January 1981, at Mymensingh Medical College with the intention of helping the helpless and serving humanity. Now it has 21 units in different medical & dental colleges. It has since broadened its scope to include voluntary blood donating, prevent Thalassaemia throughout Bangladesh & rise awareness about this. It contributes a large amount of donated blood throughout Bangladesh. It also helps poor patients by donating money and drugs. This organization also distributes vaccines.

=== SANDHANI ===
The first voluntary blood donation program in Bangladesh was begun in 1977 at Dhaka Medical College, and was organized by SANDHANI. SANDHANI has now 25 units in different medical and dental colleges. SANDHANI is a voluntary institution run by the medical and dental students of Bangladesh. It is mainly working on motivation on voluntary blood donation and posthumous eye donation in Bangladesh. SANDHANI is also working for the helpless patients in the community by serving them with drugs from the drug bank, donating blood to thalassaemia patients, giving relief to the flooded and disaster affected people etc.

=== Red Crescent Society ===
The International Red Cross and Red Crescent Movement began a blood program in Bangladesh in 1981. Today they operate several centres, using both whole blood and fractionated blood components.

=== Badhan ===
A 1997 survey of students at the University of Dhaka had found a generally favourable attitude towards voluntary blood donation, and an overwhelmingly unfavourable attitude to paid blood donation, and recommended that a campaign should be started immediately to increase awareness and participation in voluntary blood donation among the student population.

Badhan is a non-political voluntary blood donors' organisation in Bangladesh that was established in 1997. Badhan's first activity was a free blood-group testing program that took place on 24 October 1997 at Shahidullah Hall of the University of Dhaka. Shahidullah Hall is very close to Dhaka Medical College and Hospital, and before that time people needing blood for patients would gather regularly in or near the hall gate, seeking help. Mohammad Shahidul Islam Ripon was the principal originator of the program, along with other students.

The blood provided is fresh rather than stored, using a database of people whose blood type has been previously established. The graduate- and postgraduate-level students of Bangladeshi universities and postgraduate colleges are the main participants of the organisation. The organisation is active in 14 universities and 29 university colleges.

Other activities include raising awareness about donating fresh blood, donating blood voluntarily for patients and helping poor people in time of natural disasters.

Financing comes primarily from individual members and ex-members, as well as from the universities and colleges administration, from donations. The California non-profit organisation SpaandanB has been a significant contributor from outside Bangladesh. Badhan wants to make blood donation as a social movement. Its ultimate goals are (a) none should die from lack of blood, (b) every person knows his/her blood group. The head office of Badhan is located on the ground floor of TSC, Dhaka University.

=== Charpoka Blood Bank ===
Charpoka Blood Bank is an initiative by Project Charpoka. It is a voluntary blood donating project in Bangladesh. The Charpoka Blood Bank was inaugurated in 2016. It has the largest database of blood donors and it aimed to build 2 million blood donors database by 2020.
