= Vaccination in Bangladesh =

Vaccination in Bangladesh includes all aspects of vaccination in Bangladesh.

A 2020 study reported that the cost of a malaria vaccination program in Bangladesh would be cost effective in terms of increasing the people's disability-adjusted life years.

Bangladesh had its first outbreak of avian influenza in 2007 and the disease continues to be a national problem. Part of the response that scientists recommend is the development of vaccination programs, but this has been difficult.

A 2016 program to provide HPV vaccines to girls created a range of ethical issues for communities. The source of all the problems was that the design of the vaccination program came from foreign people outside the country who had no understanding of local cultural norms. There was an attempt at local consultation, but unexpected problems happened anyway. Problems included lack of public health education for the communities receiving the vaccine, forcefulness and lack of consent in arranging for girls to take the vaccine, a lack of planning to treat adverse side effects of vaccination, and a lack of female leadership and empowerment in running a health program for females.

There are multiple cholera vaccines available in Bangladesh as well as multiple strategies for making them available to people who need them. While there is major government support for vaccination, there is debate and research about how to manage the vaccination program to make it more efficient.

Bangladesh has experienced outbreaks of the Nipah virus and although a vaccine exists, the vaccine option is not well developed and preventing outbreaks without vaccines is a better option in this case.

Bangladesh began a vaccination program for congenital rubella syndrome in 2012 and since then, cases have gone down greatly.

== COVID-19 vaccination ==
Bangladesh began the administration of COVID-19 vaccines on 27 January 2021 while mass vaccination started on 7 February 2021.

== EPI (Expanded program on immunization) in Bangladesh ==
On 7th April 1979, about 5 years after EPI was launched globally by WHO, EPI was formally launched in Bangladesh as a pilot project in eight thanas. In 1985, the People's Republic of Bangladesh committed to the Global Universal Child Immunization Initiative (UCI), and began a phase-wise process of EPI intensification from 1985 to 1990.

Bangladesh has made significant progress in the elimination and control of Vaccine-preventable disease (VPDs). The last case of wild Poliovirus was detected in 2006 and maintains Polio free since then. Maternal and neonatal tetanus was eliminated in 2008. Bangladesh also achieved rubella control goal in 2018. Surveillance for AFP and measles is maintained at standard level. Bangladesh has also introduced several new vaccines since last decades. HepB vaccine was introduced in 2003, Hib in 2009, rubella in 2012, PCV and IPV in 2015, MR second dose in 2015 and fIPV in 2017.

EPI coverage percentage in Bangladesh
Year	BCG	DPT3/ Penta3	MR1	Fully Vaccinated
2010	98.6	88.7	84.8	79.4
2011	99	89.6	85.5	80.2
2013	95.1	92	85.5	80.7
2014	99.2	93	86.6	81.6
2015	99.3	93.6	87.4	82.5
2016	99.5	90.1	87.5	82.3
2019	99.7	93.3	88.6	83.9
