= Valo Kajer Hotel =

Bangladeshi non-profit initiative

- ভালো কাজের হোটেল
- Formation: December 5, 2019; 6 years ago
- Founder: Arifur Rahman
- Type: Non Profit Organization
- Purpose: Providing meals to underprivileged individuals in exchange for good deeds
- Headquarters: Dhaka, Bangladesh
- Region served: Bangladesh
- Methods: Food distribution
- Members: 1,600 (reported in 2022)
- Parent organization: Youth for Bangladesh
- Volunteers: Approximately 4,000 (reported in 2022)
- Website: www.vkhbd.org

Valo Kajer Hotel (Bengali: ভালো কাজের হোটেল; English: Hotel of Good Deeds) is a charitable food distribution initiative in Bangladesh run by the volunteer organisation Youth for Bangladesh. It provides free meals to people in need, asking recipients to describe a good deed they have done instead of paying for the food.

== History ==
Prothom Alo reported that Arifur Rahman and his friends began volunteering in 2009 after helping a man raise money for his daughter's surgery. They later provided meals to homeless people during festivals and helped children receive medical treatment. Their work was featured on the television programme Ityadi in 2010.

According to Prothom Alo, Rahman was inspired by a character in Humayun Ahmed's television drama Sobuj Chhaya, who performed a good deed every day. Rahman and his friends established Valo Kajer Hotel on 5 December 2019. They initially distributed cooked meals once a week and began providing meals daily during the COVID-19 pandemic.

On 20 July 2023, the Dhaka district administration allotted a 400-square-foot property in Wari, Dhaka, to Valo Kajer Hotel. According to Dhaka Tribune, the property was valued at approximately Tk 5 crore, and Deputy Commissioner Mohammad Mominur Rahman handed the allotment letter to Arifur Rahman.

In November 2023, Valo Kajer Hotel received Joy Bangla Youth Award in the Social Inclusion category, as reported by bdnews24.com.

In March 2026, Prothom Alo reported that Valo Kajer Hotel was providing free iftar and evening meals during Ramadan near Ramna railway station in Chilmari Upazila, Kurigram District. Organisation said it was distributing iftar to approximately 500 to 600 people each day.

== Operations ==
Valo Kajer Hotel distributes free meals to homeless people, street children, rickshaw pullers and other low-income residents. According to The Business Standard, the organisation was operating at three locations in Dhaka Korail, Tejgaon Shatrasta and the Kamalapur railway station area and one in Chattogram in August 2022.

In October 2022, United News of Bangladesh reported that the organisation was serving approximately 600 to 700 people daily. Volunteers distributed meals from a covered van, with recipients eating on the pavement. The food included khichuri, polao and rice with vegetables, eggs or meat.

Before serving a meal, volunteers ask recipients about a good deed they have performed that day and record their names, ages and responses. According to United News of Bangladesh, those who have not performed a good deed are still given food but are asked to perform two good deeds the following day.

== Funding ==
Valo Kajer Hotel is funded by contributions from its members and donations from supporters. Members of the "Daily Ten" group save Tk 10 each day and contribute the collected money at the end of the month. According to The Business Standard, the organisation began this system in 2009 with eight to ten members.

Dhaka Tribune reported in May 2022 that approximately 1,500 members were contributing Tk 10 daily, providing around Tk 450,000 per month for the organisation's activities. Additional funding came from individual donors.

== Additional projects ==
According to The Business Standard, Valo Kajer Hotel founder Arifur Rahman said in February 2024 that the organisation operated four schools in Badda, Basabo, Nandipara and Madaripur, providing free education to 910 underprivileged children. He also said the organisation had helped more than 300 children receive medical treatment.

Prothom Alo reported that Rahman also founded Rashmona Aponghor, an old-age home in Merul Badda, Dhaka. The home provides shelter to elderly people who are homeless or have no one to care for them.
