= Bangladesh famine of 1974 =

Famine in Bangladesh

Bangladesh famine of 1974 চুয়াত্তরের দুর্ভিক্ষ
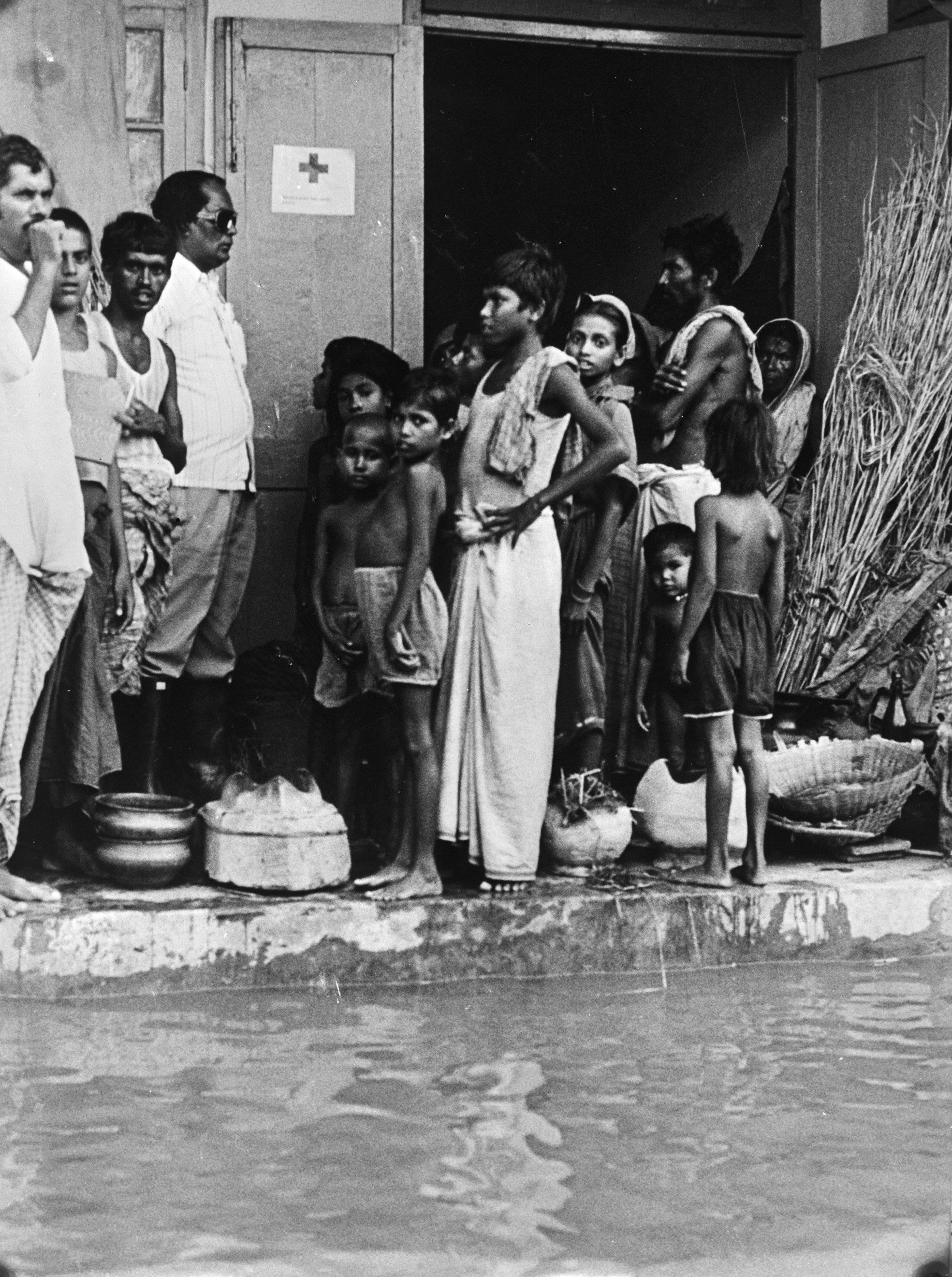
- Red Cross aid in Bangladesh; after floods, August 29, 1974
- Country: Bangladesh
- Location: Rangpur district, Bangladesh
- Period: March–December 1974
- Total deaths: 1.5 million (independent estimate) (government estimate - 27,000)
- Relief: Soup kitchens
- Effect on demographics: Population of Bangladesh declined by 0.5-1.3%
- Preceded by: Bengal famine of 1943

The Bangladesh famine of 1974 (Bengali: চুয়াত্তরের দুর্ভিক্ষ, romanized: Cuāttōrēr Durbhikkhō) began in March 1974 and ended around December of the same year. The famine is considered one of the worst in the 20th century; it was caused by government mismanagement, food grain smuggling to neighboring countries and flooding along the Brahmaputra River among other issues, resulting in high mortality. The government of Bangladesh estimated the number of deaths at 27,000 while experts attributed the death of 1.5 million people in total to the famine.

== Overview ==
After independence in 1971, Bangladesh's economy faced a crisis. According to Time magazine:

In the aftermath of the Pakistani army's rampage last March, a special team of inspectors from the World Bank observed that some cities looked "like the morning after a nuclear attack." Since then, the destruction has only been magnified. An estimated 6,000,000 homes have been destroyed, and nearly 1,400,000 farm families have been left without tools or animals to work their lands. Transportation and communications systems are totally disrupted. Roads are damaged, bridges out and inland waterways blocked. The destruction of the country continued right up until the Pakistani army surrendered a month ago. In the last days of the war, West Pakistani-owned businesses—which included nearly every commercial enterprise in the country—remitted virtually all their funds to the West. Pakistan International Airlines left exactly 117 rupees ($1.4) in its account at the port city of Chittagong. The army also destroyed bank notes and coins, so that many areas now suffer from a severe shortage of ready cash. Private cars were picked up off the streets or confiscated from auto dealers and shipped to the West before the ports were closed.

— "BANGLADESH: Mujib's Road from Prison to Power", Time, 17 January 1972.

Suffering due to lack of food, shelter and medical care in Bangladesh had been highlighted before 1974, for example in campaigns for financial support highlighted by the philosopher Peter Singer in his article, Famine, Affluence, and Morality, published in 1972. Further warnings of famine began in March 1974 when the price of rice rose sharply. In this month "widespread starvation started in Rangpur district", the region which would become one of the three most afflicted. It had only been two years and three months since the end of the war for Bangladeshi independence (December 1971) and the country's formal creation. In many ways, Bangladesh's new state and devastated infrastructure and markets were wholly unprepared to deal with the situation. Corruption among the newly appointed officials was rampant and widespread. In April, though government officials reiterated that the crisis would be temporary, rice prices continued to rise sharply and reports of starvation became more widespread. From April to July, Bangladesh was hit by heavy rainfall and a series of devastating floods along the Brahmaputra river, with notably destructive incidents in May, July; the ability of the rice crops to survive this was reduced by the growing monoculture of high-yielding varieties (HYV) of rice. In addition, neighbouring India declined to cooperate with the government of Bangladesh. Rice crops were devastated and prices rocketed. In October, rice prices peaked and conditions eased by November 1974 as foreign aid and the winter crop arrived. The famine was officially over by December, though "excess" mortality (e.g. by disease) continued well into the following year, as is the case with most famines. More people suffered in the rural areas due to starvation. Regional famine intensity was generally correlated with flood exposure, as floods exacerbated the famine. Though warnings of famine had begun long before the flood (as demonstrated above), the floods have been popularly blamed for the famine.

== Portrait of mortality ==
In terms of total mortality, though figures vary, one scholar estimates 1.5 million deaths as a reasonable estimate. This number includes the post-famine mortality. Starvation was not the only factor; a significant number of deaths are attributable to cholera, malaria and diarrheic diseases. As with most famines, weakened, disease-susceptible conditions resulted in high post-famine mortalities of over 450,000. The poor, labourers and non-landowners were especially susceptible.

Multiple authors agree that "wage labourers suffered the highest mortality for all groups". Crude death rate "among landless families was three times higher than that for families with three or more acres".

== Causes ==
Causes of the famine included flooding, rapid population growth, government mismanagement of foodgrain stocks, legislation restricting movement of foodgrains between districts, foodgrain smuggling to neighbouring countries and so called distributional failures. The famine did not occur among all areas and populations but was concentrated in specific areas; particularly those hit by flooding.

In their studies of the 1974 famine, various scholars found that 1974 average foodgrain production was a 'local' peak. For this reason, scholars argue that, "food availability approach offers very little in the way of explanation of the Bangladesh famine of 1974". Rather, they argue that the Bangladesh famine was not caused by a failure in availability of food but in distribution (or entitlement), where one group gained "market command over food".

Two distributional failures stand out. The first failure was internal: the specific configuration of the state rationing system and the market resulted in speculative hoarding by farmers and traders and a consequent rise in prices. The second failure was external: the US had withheld 2.2 million tonnes of food aid, as the then US Ambassador to Bangladesh made it abundantly clear that the US probably could not commit food aid because of Bangladesh's policy of exporting jute to Cuba. And by the time, Bangladesh succumbed to the American pressure, and stopped jute exports to Cuba, the food aid in transit was "too late for famine victims".

== Government response ==
The Government's response to the famine primarily focused on the institution of soup kitchens. By November, 1974, the government claimed it had 6,000 soup kitchens in operation across the country. A government official claimed that this helped save "five million lives". The government soup kitchens provided basic rations consisting of either a single roti, or four ounces of a porridge made of rice and daal. Other facilities provided "survival biscuits" donated by the United States.

== See also ==
- Bhat De Haramzada, Noile Manchitro Khabo
- Bengal famine (disambiguation)
- Hunger in Bangladesh
- Bangladesh Food Safety Authority
