= Sandhani =

Bangladeshi voluntary blood donation organization

Sandhani is a voluntary organization run by students of medical colleges in the health sector of Bangladesh that builds and manages blood and organ donation centers. In 2004, the government of Bangladesh awarded Sandhani the Independence Day Award, its highest civilian award, for its contribution to social service.

== History ==
Sandhani is the pioneer of the voluntary blood donation movement in Bangladesh. Sandhani began operating from Dhaka Medical College on 5 February 1977, and on 17 October 1979, Mymensingh Medical College emerged as the second unit of Sandhani. The activities of each unit are conducted through an executive committee consisting of the students of that particular unit and as well as a Central Council to coordinate all the units. Sandhani is now active in major cities of Bangladesh. In addition to blood donation, the organization also acts as a bank for human organs.

The blood collected by Sandhani is tested for viral agents before storage. On 2 November 1978, Sandhani organized the first voluntary blood donation program at DMCH Blood Bank and later this day was declared as National Voluntary Blood Donation and Postmortem Day. The Sandhani Donor Club was established in 1982 and the Sandhani National Eye Donation Society and Sandhani National Eye Bank were established in 1984.
