= HIV/AIDS in Bangladesh =

With less than 0.1 percent of the population estimated to be HIV-positive, Bangladesh is a low HIV-prevalence country.

== Prevalence ==
The country faces a concentrated epidemic, and its very low HIV-prevalence rate is partly due to prevention efforts, focusing on female sex workers, and intravenous drug users. Four years before the disease's 1989 appearance in the country, the government implemented numerous prevention efforts targeting the above high-risk populations as well as migrant workers. Although these activities have helped keep the incidence of HIV down, the number of HIV-positive individuals has increased steadily since 1994 to approximately 7,500 people in 2005 according to the International Center for Diarrhoeal Disease Research, Bangladesh. UNAIDS estimates the number to be slightly higher at 11,000 people.

While HIV prevalence is very low in the general population, among most at risk populations it rises to 0.7%. In some cases it is as high as 3.7%, for instance among casual sex workers in Hili, a small border town in northwest Bangladesh. Many of the estimated 11,000 people living with HIV are migrant workers. The 2006 National AIDS/STD programme estimated that 67% of identified HIV positive cases in the country were returnee migrant workers and their spouses. This is similar to findings from other organisations. According to the International Centre for Diarrhoeal Disease Research, Bangladesh (ICDDR, B), 47 of 259 cases of people living with HIV during the period 2002–2004 were identified during the migration process. Other data from 2004 (from the National AIDS/Sexually Transmitted Disease (STD) programme of the Ministry of Health and Family Welfare (MoHFW)) shows that 57 of 102 newly reported HIV cases were among returning migrants.

While HIV prevalence among male homosexuals and sex workers has remained below 1 percent, unsafe practices among drug users, particularly needle sharing, have caused a sharp increase in the number of people infected. Measurements at one central surveillance point showed that between 2001 and 2005, incidence of HIV in IDUs more than doubled – from 1.4 percent to 4.9 percent, according to UNAIDS. In 2004, 9 percent of IDUs at one location in Dhaka were HIV-positive. Compounding the risk of an epidemic, a large proportion of IDUs (up to 20 percent in some regions) reported buying sex, fewer than 10 percent of whom said they consistently used a condom.

== Preventive programs ==
HIV/AIDS prevention programs have successfully reached 71.6 percent of commercial sex workers (CSWs) in Bangladesh, according to the 2005 United Nations General Assembly Special Session (UNGASS) Country Report. However, only 39.8 percent of sex workers reported using a condom with their most recent client, and just 23.4 percent both correctly identified ways of preventing the sexual transmission of HIV and rejected major misconceptions about HIV transmission. Other factors contributing to Bangladesh's HIV/AIDS vulnerability include cross-border interaction with high-prevalence regions in Burma and northeast India, low condom use among the general population, and a general lack of knowledge about HIV/AIDS and other sexually transmitted infections (STIs). For instance, a study in 2008 found poor HIV knowledge among female migrant workers who were flying for an overseas job. Research performed by Islam & Conigrave (2007) found that there were substantial gaps between current needs and the ongoing prevention efforts. The authors stressed the importance of developing a pre-departure and post-departure program for international migrants; increased co-ordination among intervening agencies and equitable coverage of prevention programs.

== Tuberculosis ==
Bangladesh also has a high tuberculosis (TB) burden, with 102 new cases per 100,000 people in 2005, according to the World Health Organization. HIV infects about 0.1 percent of adult TB patients in Bangladesh and HIV-TB co-infections complicate treatment and care for both diseases.

== National response ==
Bangladesh's HIV/AIDS prevention program started in 1985, when the Minister of Health and Family Welfare established the National AIDS and Sexually Transmitted Diseases Program under the overall policy support of the National AIDS Council (NAC), headed by the President and chaired by the Minister of Health and Family Welfare. The National AIDS/STD Program has set in place guidelines on key issues including testing, care, blood safety, sexually transmitted infections, and prevention among youth, women, migrant populations, and sex workers. In 2004, a six-year National Strategic Plan (2004–2010) was approved. The country's HIV policies and strategies are based on other successful family planning programs in Bangladesh and include participation from schools, as well as religious and community organisations. The AIDS Initiative Organization was launched in 2007 to fund for those without proper medication to combat the virus. The National HIV and AIDS Communication Strategy (2006–2010) was also developed and launched.

Since 2000, the Government of Bangladesh has worked with the World Bank on the HIV/AIDS Prevention Project, a $26 million program designed to prevent HIV from spreading within most-at-risk populations and into the general population. The program is being integrated into the country's Health, Nutrition and Population Program, which is supported by the government and external donors. In 2003, a national youth policy was established on reproductive health, including HIV/AIDS awareness. Since 2006, students in 21,500 secondary and upper-secondary schools have been taught about HIV/AIDS issues. The educational program introduces a "life skills" curriculum, including a chapter on HIV/AIDS drafted with assistance from the United Nations Children's Fund (UNICEF).

Bangladesh developed its first Antiretroviral Therapy (ART) treatment guidelines in 2006, with PLHIV able to buy subsidised antiretroviral drugs from specified pharmacies. Unfortunately, most HIV diagnostic facilities are provided by NGOs based in Dhaka and most rural and cross-border migrants miss out on ART, HIV testing and other associated care and support services. If they seek private care, the cost is often beyond their means.

Currently, the program funded by the Global Fund is leading the national response to fight HIV and AIDS. Bangladesh had received 3 grants on HIV/AIDS from The Global Fund to fight AIDS, Tuberculosis and Malaria: Round 2 from 2004 to 2009, Round 6 from 2007 to 2012 and Rolling Continuation Channel (RCC) from 2009 to 2015. The Round 2 grant focused mainly on prevention of HIV among young people with strategies including:

1. HIV/AIDS prevention messages dissemination through information campaign in mass and print media
2. HIV/AIDS orientation, training and services via Life skills education, Youth Friendly Health services and accessing condom
3. Integration of HIV/AIDS in school and college curriculum
4. Advocacy and sensitisation of religious leaders, parents and policy makers
5. Generating information for policies and programs.

The main focus of the Round 6 grant was on most at risk populations and scaling up of the Round 2 project including interventions with vulnerable youth. The interventions for High Risk population and vulnerable young people includes essential services for injecting drug users and female sex workers; treatment, care and support for PLHIV; and awareness and prevention strategy for vulnerable young people including garment industry workers. National level capacity building, strengthening district co-ordination, support to networks and self-help groups are also among the strategies.

Round 2 and Round 6 have been implemented through Public–Private Partnership where the Economic Relations Division of the Government of Bangladesh worked as Principal Recipient and Save the Children USA managed the grants as Management Agency in collaboration with Ministry of Health and Family Welfare. Based on the satisfactory level of completion of the Round 2 project, Global Fund awarded Bangladesh with the 6 year fund termed as "Rolling Continuation Channel (RCC)" from 2009 to 2015, which is consolidated with the Round 6 grant. For high level of performance the Project is appreciated as a "best practice" example in Asia and is rated as "A" by the Global Fund. The program is being implemented through 13 technical packages by 13 consortiums comprising 61 organisations nationwide. Save the Children, as a Principle Recipient of the grant is facilitating implementation through technical and compliance related support to all the consortia. Other Principal Recipients are National AIDS/STD Program and ICDDR B. The main objectives of RCC Program are:

1. Increase the scale of prevention services for key populations at higher risk: Injecting Drug Users (IDUs), Sex Workers (FSWs), hijras (transgender people) & Men who have Sex with Men (MSM)
2. Increase the scale of the most effective HIV/AIDS activities conducted through Round 2
3. Build capacity of partners to increase scale of national response to the HIV/AIDS epidemic

Some significant achievements of the HIV/AIDS program funded by the Global Fund are:

1. Overall HIV Prevalence remains <1%
2. HIV/AIDS information is included in text books of secondary and higher secondary level education, from grades VI to XII, in both Bangla and English
3. HIV/AIDS prevention, care & support related information now mainstreamed within the training curriculum of five different Ministries
4. National standards for Youth Friendly Health Services (YFHS) have been established, now practised in public, NGO & private health service facilities countrywide
5. Standard Operating Procedures (SOP) for services to PLHIV have been endorsed by the government
6. Public–private partnership has been proved to be an effective model for fighting AIDS
7. Over 300 people living with HIV and AIDS (PLHIV) are receiving anti-retroviral treatment (ARV) per year
8. Workplace policy on Life Skills-based Education (LSE) on HIV/AIDS endorsed by Bangladesh Garments Manufacturers' association (BGMEA)
9. Under the Ministry of Religious Affairs, 4 booklets on HIV/AIDS have been published for the 4 major practising religions in the country
