= Outline of Bangladesh =

Country in South Asia

The Flag of Bangladesh

The National Emblem of Bangladesh

Location of Bangladesh

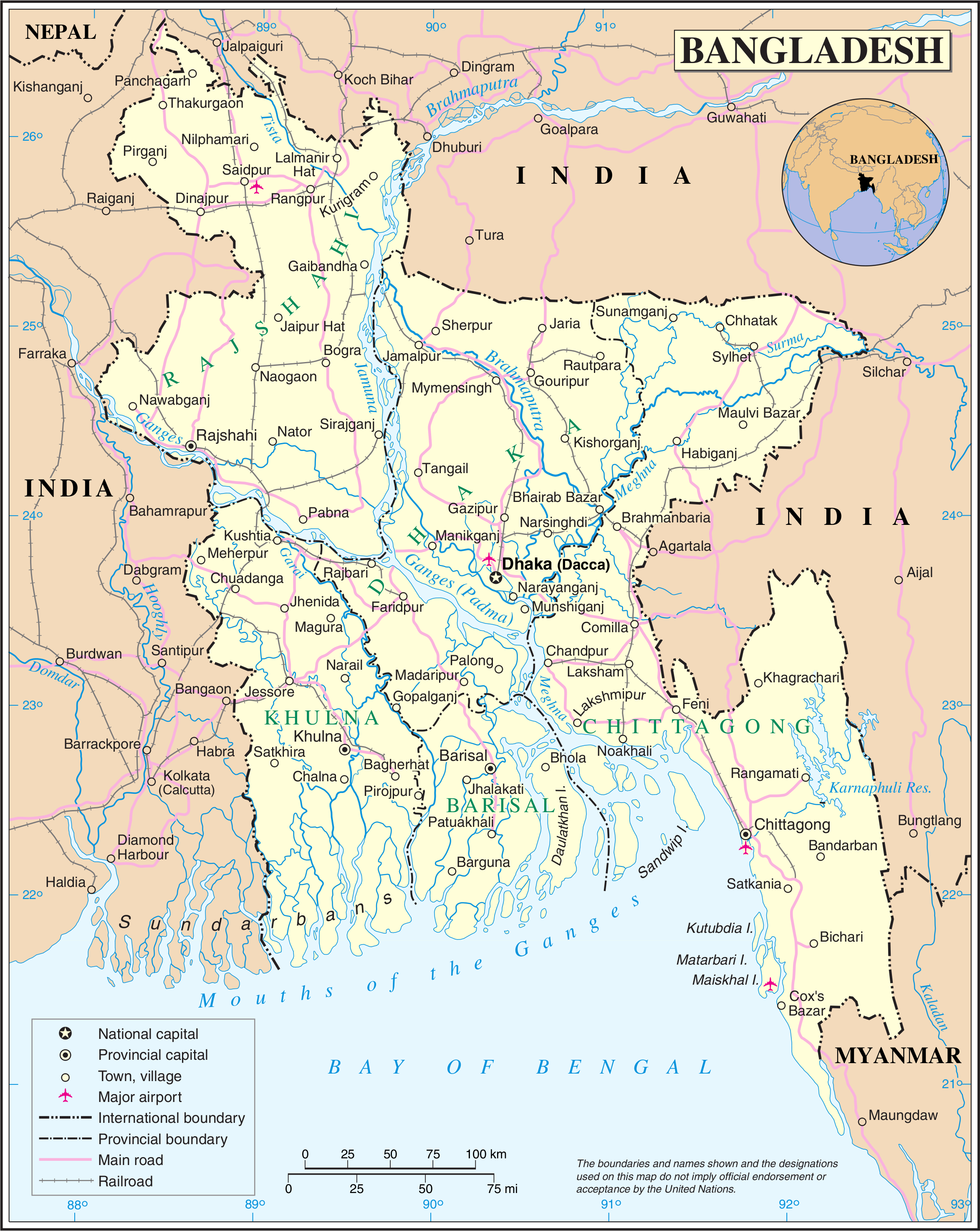
An enlargeable map of the People's Republic of Bangladesh

The following outline is provided as an overview of and topical guide to Bangladesh:

Bangladesh, officially the People's Republic of Bangladesh, is a country in South Asia. It is the eighth-most populous country in the world with a population of almost 180 million within an area of 148,461 square kilometres (57,321 sq mi). Bangladesh shares land borders with India to the north, west, and east, and Myanmar to the southeast. It has a coastline along the Bay of Bengal to its south and is separated from Bhutan and Nepal by the Siliguri Corridor, and from China by the Indian states of West Bengal and Sikkim to its north. Dhaka, the capital and largest city, is the nation's political, financial, and cultural centre. Chittagong is the second-largest city and the busiest port of the country.

== General reference ==
- Pronunciation: English: /ˌbæŋɡləˈdɛʃ, ˌbɑːŋ-/, Bengali: [ˈbaŋladeʃ]
- Common English country name: Bangladesh
- Official English country name: People's Republic of Bangladesh
- Common endonym: Bangladesh
- Official endonym: Bangladesh
- Adjectival: Bangladeshi
- Demonym: Bangladeshis
- ISO Country codes: BD, BGD, 050
- ISO Region codes: See ISO 3166-2:BD
- Internet country code top-level domain: .bd, .বাংলা
- International rankings of Bangladesh

== Geography of Bangladesh ==
Geography of Bangladesh

- Bangladesh is: a country
- Location:
  - Northern Hemisphere and Eastern Hemisphere
  - Eurasia
    - Asia
      - South Asia
        - Indian subcontinent
  - Time zone: Bangladesh Standard Time (UTC+06), Bangladesh Daylight Saving Time (UTC+07)
  - Extreme points of Bangladesh
    - High: Saka Haphong 1,052 m (3,451 ft)
    - Low: Bay of Bengal 0 m
  - Land boundaries (Land border crossings of Bangladesh): 4,246 km
    India 4,053 km
    Myanmar 193 km
  - Coastline: 580 km
    Bay of Bengal
- Population of Bangladesh: 162,221,000 (2009) – 8th most populous country
- Area of Bangladesh: 147,570 square kilometres (56,980 sq mi) – 94th largest country
- Atlas of Bangladesh

=== Environment of Bangladesh ===
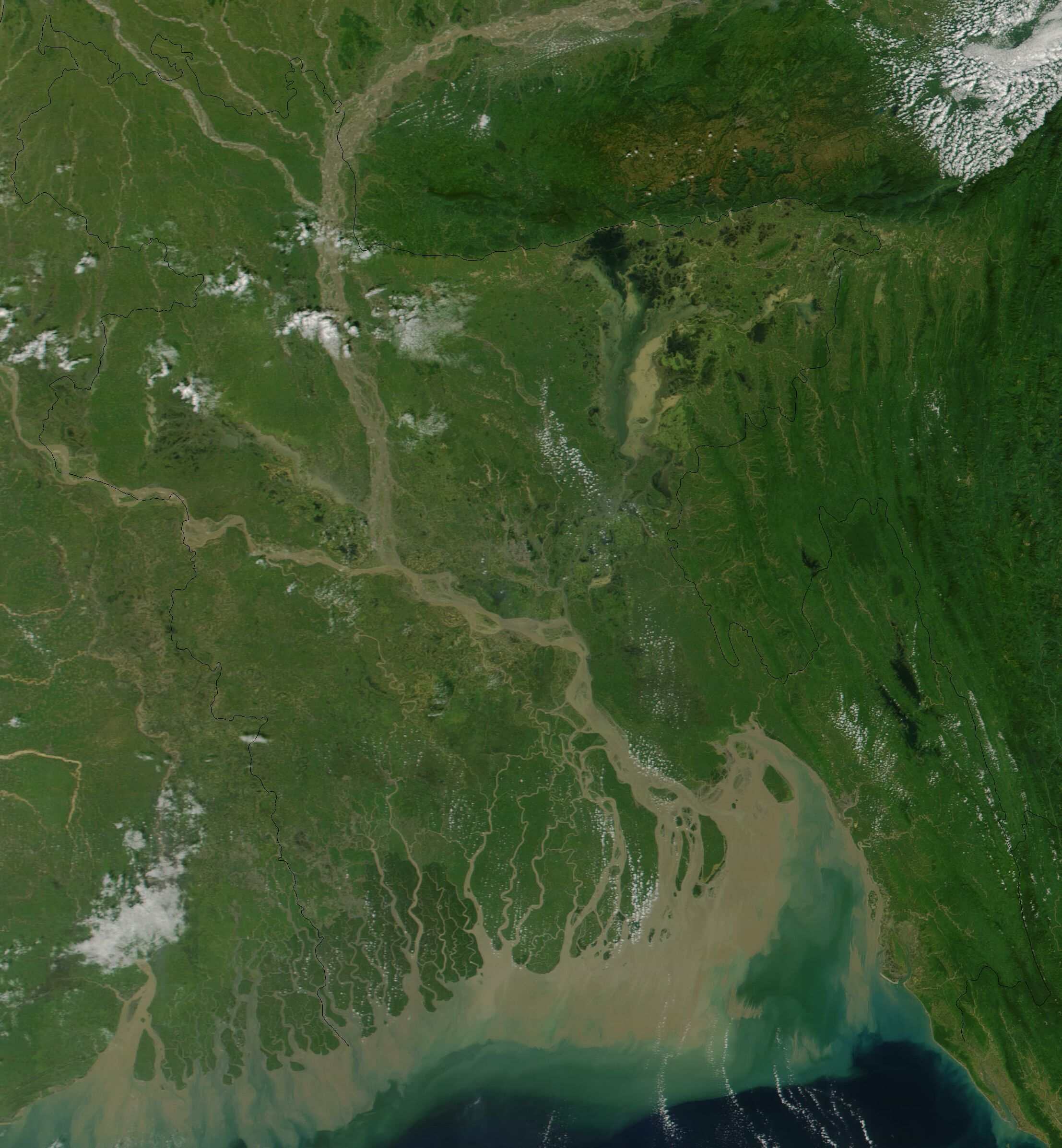
An enlargeable satellite image of Bangladesh

- Climate of Bangladesh
- Renewable energy in Bangladesh
- Geology of Bangladesh
- Environmental issues in Bangladesh
- Protected areas of Bangladesh
  - National parks of Bangladesh
- Wildlife of Bangladesh
  - Fauna of Bangladesh
    - Birds of Bangladesh
    - Mammals of Bangladesh
      - Bengal tiger
    - Reptiles of Bangladesh
      - Bengal monitor

==== Natural geographic features of Bangladesh ====
- Beaches in Bangladesh
  - Cox's Bazar
  - Kuakata
  - Patenga
- Islands of Bangladesh
- Mountains of Bangladesh
  - Keokradong
- Rivers of Bangladesh
- List of World Heritage Sites in Bangladesh

==== Administrative divisions of Bangladesh ====
Administrative divisions of Bangladesh

- Divisions of Bangladesh
  - Districts of Bangladesh
    - Upazilas of Bangladesh

===== Divisions of Bangladesh =====
Divisions of Bangladesh

- Barisal
- Chittagong
- Dhaka
- Khulna
- Mymensingh
- Rajshahi
- Rangpur
- Sylhet

===== Districts of Bangladesh =====
Districts of Bangladesh

Barisal

- Barguna
- Barisal
- Bhola
- Jhalokati
- Patuakhali
- Pirojpur

Chittagong

- Bandarban
- Brahmanbaria
- Chandpur
- Chittagong
- Cumilla
- Cox's Bazar
- Feni
- Khagrachari
- Lakshmipur
- Noakhali
- Rangamati

Dhaka

- Dhaka
- Faridpur
- Gazipur
- Gopalganj
- Kishoreganj
- Madaripur
- Manikganj
- Munshiganj
- Narayanganj
- Narsingdi
- Rajbari
- Shariatpur
- Tangail

Khulna

- Bagerhat
- Chuadanga
- Jessore
- Jhenaidah
- Khulna
- Kushtia
- Magura
- Meherpur
- Narail
- Satkhira

Mymensingh

- Jamalpur
- Mymensingh
- Netrakona
- Sherpur

Rajshahi

- Bogra
- Jaipurhat
- Naogaon
- Natore
- Nawabganj
- Pabna
- Rajshahi
- Sirajganj

Rangpur

- Dinajpur
- Gaibandha
- Kurigram
- Lalmonirhat
- Nilphamari
- Panchagarh
- Rangpur
- Thakurgaon

Sylhet

- Habiganj
- Moulvibazar
- Sunamganj
- Sylhet

===== Subdistricts of Bangladesh =====
Upazilas of Bangladesh The districts are subdivided into 493 sub-districts, or upazila.

===== Cities of Bangladesh =====
- Major cities of Bangladesh
  - Dhaka – capital city and the political, economic and cultural heart of Bangladesh. Dhaka is the most populous city in Bangladesh and the tenth-largest city in the world, with a population of over 15 million inhabitants.
  - Chittagong – second most populous city and main seaport of Bangladesh. It is a major commercial, financial and industrial hub. Located on the Karnaphuli River, it is the administrative seat of Chittagong District and Chittagong Division (the largest division of Bangladesh). The metropolitan area has a population of 4 million residents.
  - Khulna – third-largest city in Bangladesh, with a population of more than 1.4 million people. Khulna is also the third largest economic centre in Bangladesh. The major sectors are jute, chemicals, fish and seafood packaging, food processing, sugar mills, power generation and shipbuilding.
  - Rajshahi – Rajshahi is a prominent commercial hub and industrial centre of North Bengal. For its venerable silk industry, it is nicknamed "Silk City". It has a population of more than 800,000.
  - Barisal – city in southern Bangladesh, rice and other crops producing centre of Bangladesh. Fish is also plentiful because Barisal stands on the Kirtankhola River and is surrounded by it. A Bengali saying states, Dhan, nadi, khal ai tine Barisal, which translates to "paddy, river and canal are the three things that make Barisal". It is a fast growing city, with nearly 0.38 million people and a divisional headquarters, university, medical college, engineering college, cadet college, some pharmaceutical industries, and textile industries. The city is sometimes called the "Venice of the East" or the "Venice of Bengal".
  - Sylhet – city with a population of over 500,000 people that lies on the banks of Surma River in north-east Bangladesh. It is surrounded by tea estates, sub-tropical hills, rain forests and river valleys; the region is one of the leading tourist destinations in the country.
  - Cumilla – city in eastern Bangladesh, located along the Dhaka-Chittagong Highway, 97 kilometres from the capital city, Dhaka, which can also be reached by railway. Comilla is second-largest city of eastern Bangladesh after Chittagong and is one of the three oldest cities in Bangladesh.
  - Rangpur – 5th-largest city in Bangladesh, located in its north western part. Agricultural products such as rice, jute (called the golden fibre of Bangladesh), wheat, tobacco, and potato are the major driving power of the economy here.
  - Narayanganj – city in central Bangladesh, located in the Narayanganj District, near the capital city of Dhaka. The city is on the bank of the Shitalakshya River and has a population of 220,000. The river port of Narayanganj is one of the oldest in Bangladesh. It is also a centre of business and industry, especially the jute trade and processing plants, and of the textile sector of the country.
  - Gazipur – city in central Bangladesh with a population of over 1.1 million.
  - more cities...
- List of cities and towns in Bangladesh

===== Villages of Bangladesh =====
- Villages in Bangladesh

=== Demography of Bangladesh ===
Demographics of Bangladesh

- 1991 Census of Bangladesh
- 2001 Census of Bangladesh
- 2011 Census of Bangladesh
- 2022 Census of Bangladesh

== Government and politics of Bangladesh ==
Politics of Bangladesh

- Form of government: parliamentary representative democratic republic
- Capital of Bangladesh: Dhaka
- Elections in Bangladesh

Since independence of the country, 13 Parliamentary Elections and 3 Presidential Elections were held. There were 6 other presidential elections under Parliamentary management.

  - Parliamentary Elections
    - 1973 Bangladeshi general election
    - 1979 Bangladeshi general election
    - 1986 Bangladeshi general election
    - 1988 Bangladeshi general election
    - 1991 Bangladeshi general election
    - 1996 (Feb) Bangladeshi general election
    - 1996 (Jun) Bangladeshi general election
    - 2001 Bangladeshi general election
    - 2008 Bangladeshi general election
    - 2014 Bangladeshi general election
    - 2018 Bangladeshi general election
    - 2024 Bangladeshi general election
    - 2026 Bangladeshi general election
  - Presidential Elections
    - 1974 Bangladeshi presidential election
    - 1978 Bangladeshi presidential election
    - 1981 Bangladeshi presidential election
    - 1986 Bangladeshi presidential election
    - 1991 Bangladeshi presidential election
    - 1996 Bangladeshi presidential election
    - 2001 Bangladeshi presidential election
    - 2009 Bangladeshi presidential election
    - 2013 Bangladeshi presidential election
    - 2018 Bangladeshi presidential election
    - 2023 Bangladeshi presidential election
    - 2026 Bangladeshi presidential election
- Political parties in Bangladesh
- Taxation in Bangladesh

=== Branches of government ===
Government of Bangladesh

==== Executive branch of the government of Bangladesh ====
- Head of state: President of Bangladesh, Mirza Fakhrul Islam Alamgir
- Head of government: Prime Minister of Bangladesh, Tarique Rahman
- Cabinet of Bangladesh

==== Legislative branch of the government of Bangladesh ====
- Parliament of Bangladesh: Jatiya Sangsad (unicameral)

==== Judicial branch of the government of Bangladesh ====
Court system of Bangladesh

- Supreme Court of Bangladesh

=== Foreign relations of Bangladesh ===
Foreign relations of Bangladesh

- Diplomatic missions in Bangladesh
- BIMSTEC
- Indo-Bangladeshi barrier
- South Asian Association for Regional Cooperation

==== Foreign relations with specific countries ====
- Afghanistan–Bangladesh relations
- Algeria–Bangladesh relations
- Argentina–Bangladesh relations
- Australia–Bangladesh relations
- Austria–Bangladesh relations
- Azerbaijan–Bangladesh relations
- Bangladesh–Italy relations
- Bangladesh–Israel relations
- Bangladesh–Ivory Coast relations
- Bangladesh–Japan relations
- Bangladesh–Jordan relations
- Bangladesh–Kazakhstan relations
- Bangladesh–Kenya relations
- Bangladesh-Korea Technical Training Centre
- Bangladesh–Kyrgyzstan relations
- Bangladesh–Laos relations
- Bangladesh–Latvia relations
- Bangladesh–Lebanon relations
- Bangladesh–Liberia relations
- Bangladesh–Luxembourg relations
- Bangladesh–Malawi relations
- Bangladesh–Malaysia relations
- Bangladesh–Mali relations
- Bangladesh–Mauritius relations
- Bangladesh–Mexico relations
- Bangladesh–Myanmar relations
- Bangladesh–Nepal relations
- Bangladesh–New Zealand relations
- Bangladesh–Nigeria relations
- Bangladesh–Pakistan relations
- Bangladesh–Panama relations
- Bangladesh–Poland relations
- Bangladesh–Portugal relations
- Bangladesh–Russia relations
- Bangladesh–Rwanda relations
- Bangladesh–Saudi Arabia relations
- Bangladesh–Serbia relations
- Bangladesh–Sierra Leone relations
- Bangladesh–Slovakia relations
- Bangladesh–South Korea relations
- Bangladesh–South Sudan relations
- Bangladesh–Spain relations
- Bangladesh–Sri Lanka relations
- Bangladesh–Sudan relations
- Bangladesh–Tajikistan relations
- Bangladesh–Thailand relations
- Bangladesh–Trinidad and Tobago relations
- Bangladesh–Turkey relations
- Bangladesh–Uganda relations
- Bangladesh–Ukraine relations
- Bangladesh–United Kingdom relations
- Bangladesh–United States relations
- Bangladesh–Venezuela relations
- Bangladesh–Yemen relations

==== International organisation membership ====
The People's Republic of Bangladesh is a member of:

- African Union/United Nations Hybrid operation in Darfur (UNAMID)
- Asian Development Bank (ADB)
- Association of Southeast Asian Nations Regional Forum (ARF)
- Bay of Bengal Initiative for Multi-Sectoral Technical and Economic Cooperation (BIMSTEC)
- Colombo Plan (CP)
- Commonwealth of Nations
- Food and Agriculture Organization (FAO)
- Group of 77 (G77)
- Member state of the Commonwealth of Nations
- International Bank for Reconstruction and Development (IBRD)
- International Chamber of Commerce (ICC)
- International Criminal Court (ICCt) (signatory)
- International Criminal Police Organization (Interpol)
- International Development Association (IDA)
- International Federation of Red Cross and Red Crescent Societies (IFRCS)
- International Finance Corporation (IFC)
- International Hydrographic Organization (IHO)
- International Mobile Satellite Organization (IMSO)
- International Olympic Committee (IOC)
- International Organization for Migration (IOM)
- International Organization for Standardization (ISO)
- International Red Cross and Red Crescent Movement (ICRM)
- International Telecommunications Satellite Organization (ITSO)
- International Trade Union Confederation (ITUC)
- Islamic Development Bank (IDB)
- Multilateral Investment Guarantee Agency (MIGA)
- Nonaligned Movement (NAM)
- Organisation of Islamic Cooperation (OIC)
- Organisation for the Prohibition of Chemical Weapons (OPCW)
- South Asia Co-operative Environment Programme (SACEP)
- South Asian Association for Regional Cooperation (SAARC)
- World Confederation of Labour (WCL)
- World Customs Organization (WCO)
- World Federation of Trade Unions (WFTU)
- World Trade Organization (WTO)
- Member state of the United Nations
  - United Nations Conference on Trade and Development (UNCTAD)
  - United Nations Educational, Scientific, and Cultural Organization (UNESCO)
  - United Nations High Commissioner for Refugees (UNHCR)
  - United Nations Industrial Development Organization (UNIDO)
  - United Nations Integrated Mission in Timor-Leste (UNMIT)
  - United Nations Mission for the Referendum in Western Sahara (MINURSO)
  - United Nations Mission in Liberia (UNMIL)
  - United Nations Mission in the Central African Republic and Chad (MINURCAT)
  - United Nations Mission in the Sudan (UNMIS)
  - United Nations Observer Mission in Georgia (UNOMIG)
  - United Nations Operation in Cote d'Ivoire (UNOCI)
  - United Nations Organization Mission in the Democratic Republic of the Congo (MONUC)
  - International Atomic Energy Agency (IAEA)
  - International Civil Aviation Organization (ICAO)
  - International Fund for Agricultural Development (IFAD)
  - International Labour Organization (ILO)
  - International Maritime Organization (IMO)
  - International Monetary Fund (IMF)
  - International Telecommunication Union (ITU)
  - Universal Postal Union (UPU)
  - World Health Organization (WHO)
  - World Intellectual Property Organization (WIPO)
  - World Meteorological Organization (WMO)
  - World Tourism Organization (UNWTO)

=== Law and order in Bangladesh ===
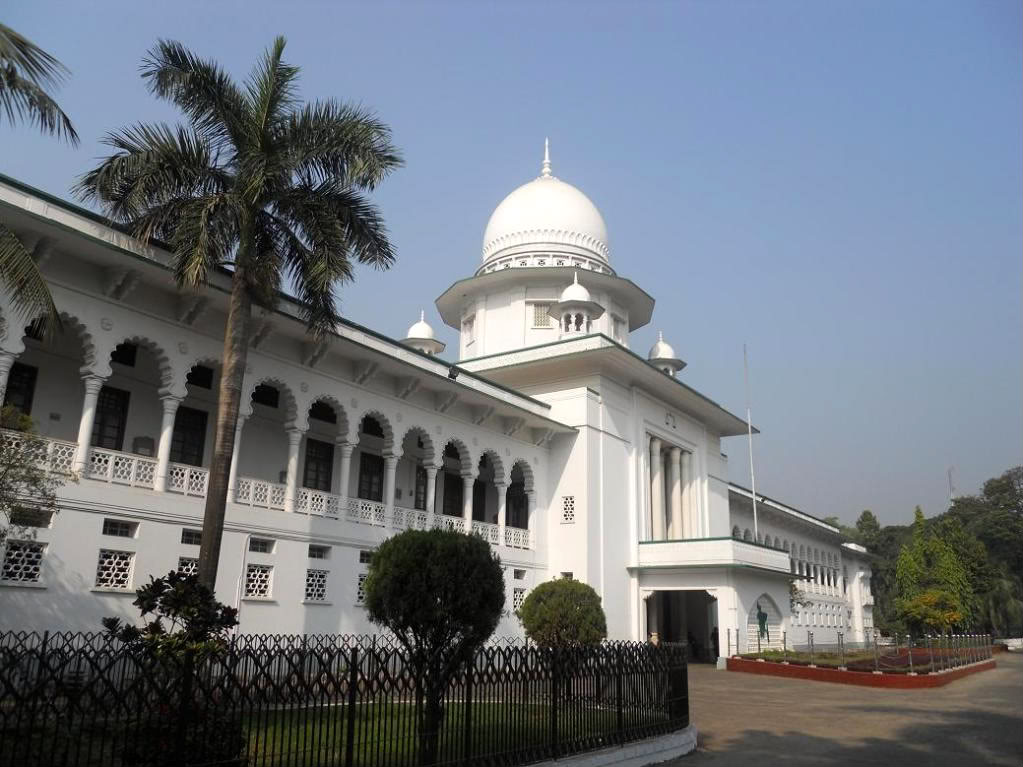
Supreme Court of Bangladesh

Law of Bangladesh

- Crime in Bangladesh
  - Human trafficking in Bangladesh
  - Corruption in Bangladesh
  - Persecution of Biharis in Bangladesh
  - Suicide in Bangladesh
- Human rights in Bangladesh
  - Abortion in Bangladesh
  - Child labour in Bangladesh
  - Gender inequality in Bangladesh
    - BRAC (NGO)
  - LGBT rights in Bangladesh
    - LGBT history in Bangladesh
  - Freedom of religion in Bangladesh
  - Women in Bangladesh
  - Polygamy in Bangladesh
- Law enforcement in Bangladesh
  - Bangladesh Police
    - Bangladesh Ansar
    - Rapid Action Battalion
- Laws of Bangladesh
  - Constitution of Bangladesh
  - Blasphemy law in Bangladesh
  - Capital punishment in Bangladesh
  - Indemnity Act
  - Vested Property Act (Bangladesh)
- Ministry of Home Affairs

=== Military of Bangladesh ===
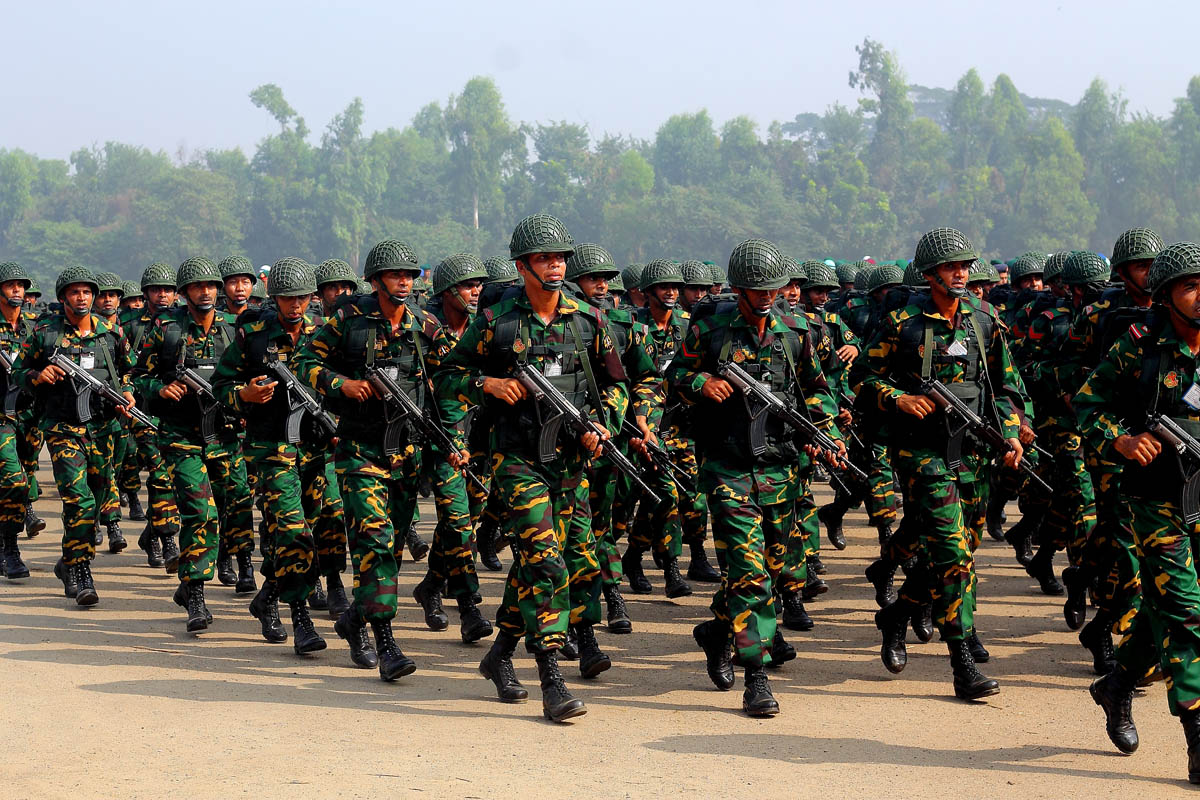
Bangladesh Army during Victory Day Parade 2011

Military of Bangladesh

- Command
  - Commander-in-chief: President of Bangladesh
    - Ministry of Defence of Bangladesh
- Forces
  - Army of Bangladesh
    - Bangladesh Infantry Regiment
    - East Bengal Regiment
    - Bangladesh Military Academy
  - Border Guard Bangladesh
  - Navy of Bangladesh
  - Air Force of Bangladesh
  - Rapid Action Battalion
- Military bases
  1. Dhaka Cantonment
  2. Alikadam Cantonment
  3. Bandarban Cantonment
  4. Bogra Cantonment
  5. Chittagong Cantonment
  6. Cumilla Cantonment
  7. Dighinala Cantonment
  8. Mithamain Cantonment
  9. Guimara Cantonment
  10. Halishahar Cantonment
  11. Jahanabad Cantonment
  12. Jahangirabad Cantonment
  13. Jalalabad Cantonment
  14. Jamuna Cantonment
  15. Jessore Cantonment
  16. Kaptai Cantonment
  17. Khagrachhari Cantonment
  18. Kholahati Cantonment
  19. Lalmonirhat Cantonment
  20. Lebukhali Cantonment
  21. Mirpur Cantonment
  22. Mymensingh Cantonment
  23. Postogola Cantonment
  24. Qadirabad Cantonment
  25. Rajendrapur Cantonment
  26. Rajshahi Cantonment
  27. Ramu Cantonment
  28. Rangamati Cantonment
  29. Rangpur Cantonment
  30. Saidpur Cantonment
  31. Savar Cantonment
  32. Shahid Salahuddin Cantonment
  33. Padma Cantonment
  34. Sylhet Cantonment
- Military History of Bangladesh
- Military coups in Bangladesh
  - 15 August 1975 Bangladeshi coup d'état
  - 3 November 1975 Bangladeshi coup d'état
  - 7 November 1975 Bangladeshi coup d'état
  - 1977 Bangladesh Air Force mutiny
  - 1977 Bogra mutiny
  - 1982 Bangladeshi coup d'état
  - 1996 Bangladeshi coup attempt
  - 2006–2008 Bangladeshi political crisis
  - Bangladesh Rifles revolt
  - 2011 Bangladeshi coup attempt

=== Local government in Bangladesh ===
Local government in Bangladesh

== History of Bangladesh ==
History of Bangladesh

- History of Bangladesh
- Timeline of Bangladeshi history
- History of Bengal – geographical and ethno-linguistic region in South Asia. was politically divided in the 1947 Partition of Bengal based on religion: predominantly Hindu West Bengal became a province (now a state) of India, and predominantly Muslim East Bengal (now Bangladesh) became a province of Pakistan.

=== History of Bangladesh, by period ===
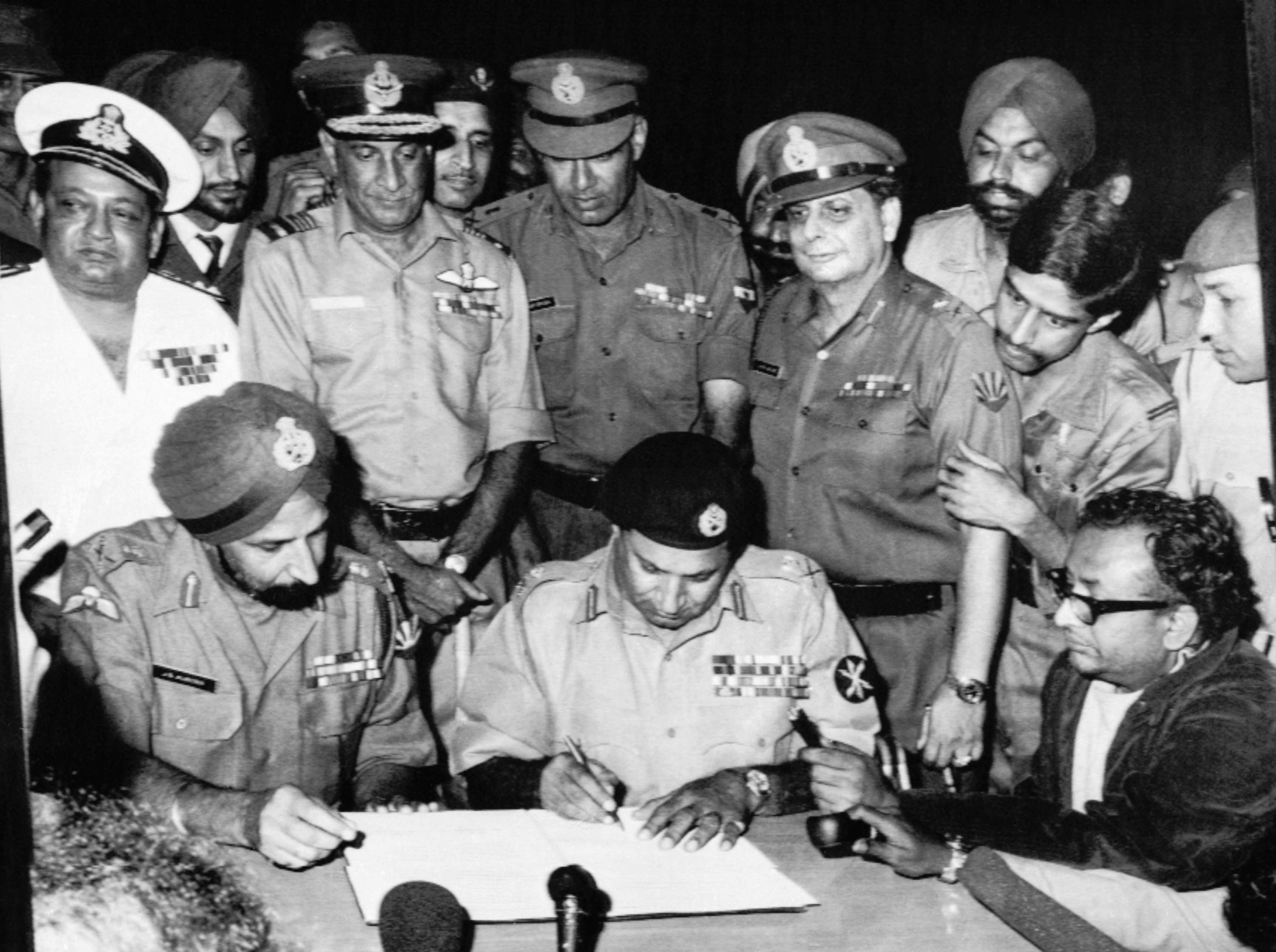
Lieutenant-General A. A. K. Niazi, the commander of Pakistan Eastern Command, signing the instrument of surrender in Dhaka on 16 Dec 1971, in the presence of India's Lt. Gen. Jagjit Singh Aurora.

==== Ancient and Classical Period ====
- Vanga Kingdom
- Pundravardhana
- Samatata
- Anga
- Suhma kingdom
- Harikela
- Gangaridai
- Bhulua
- Nandas
- Mayuras
- Shungas
- Guptas
- Varmanas
- Kamarupa
- Jaintia
- Gour
- Laur
- Mallabhum
- Bhadras
- Khadgas
- Devas
- Pratapgarh
- Taraf

==== Middle Ages ====
- Kingdom of Gauda
- Pala Empire
- Chandra dynasty
- Sena Empire
- Islamic Rule
  - Khalji dynasty
  - Delhi Sultanate
  - House of Balban
  - City states:
    - Sonargaon
    - Lakhnauti
    - Satgaon
  - Bengal Sultanate:
    - Ilyas Shahi dynasty
    - House of Ganesha
    - Hussain Shahi dynasty
    - Karrani dynasty
  - Sur Empire
  - Twelve Bhuyan Confederacy
  - Kingdom of Mrauk U
  - Jaintia Kingdom
  - Pratapgarh Kingdom
  - Koch dynasty
  - Kingdom of Tripura
  - Kingdom of Bhurshut
  - Mughal Empire:
    - Bengal Subah
    - Burdwan Raj
    - Rajshahi Raj
    - Nadia Raj
    - Bettiah Raj
    - Zamindars
  - Nawabs of Bengal (Independent Bengal Subah)
  - Maratha expeditions in Bengal

==== European Settlements ====
- Serampore - Danish Bengal
- Bankipur (Bengal) - Austrian Bengal
- Chandannagar - French Bengal
- Portuguese Bengal - Chittagong
- Dutch Bengal - Directorate of Bengal
- Early English settlements 1600s
- East India Company
- British Raj

==== British Rule ====
- Battle of Plassey
- Permanent Settlement
- Dhaka Nawab Family
- Anushilan Samiti
- Partition of Bengal (1905)
  - East Bengal
- Chittagong armoury raid

==== East Bengal/Pakistani ====
- Partition of Bengal (1947)
  - East Bengal
- Bengali language movement

==== Modern history ====
- Liberation War period
  - 1971 Bangladesh atrocities
  - Agartala Conspiracy Case
  - Al-Badr (East Pakistan)
  - Al-Shams
  - Archer Blood
  - Bangladesh Liberation War
  - Battle of Garibpur
  - Battle of Hilli
  - Chorompotro
  - Chuknagar massacre
  - The Concert for Bangladesh
  - East Pakistan
  - Ekattorer Dingulee
  - Hemayet Bahini
  - Indo-Pakistani War of 1971
  - Instrument of Surrender (1971)
  - Jinjira genocide
  - Kader Bahini
  - List of books on Liberation War of Bangladesh
  - Martyred intellectual
  - Mitro Bahini
  - M. R. Akhtar Mukul
  - Mukti Bahini
  - Razakar
  - Recipients of Bangladeshi military awards in 1971
  - Shanti Committee
  - Six point movement
  - Swadhin Bangla Betar Kendra
  - 1962 Rajshahi massacres
  - 1964 East-Pakistan riots
- 1970 on
  - 1971 Bangladesh genocide
  - Bangladesh famine of 1974
  - Chittagong Hill Tracts conflict
  - Assassination of Sheikh Mujibur Rahman
  - Assassination of Ziaur Rahman
  - 2012 Ramu violence

==== Years in Bangladesh ====
1971 - 1972 - 1973 - 1974 - 1975 - 1976 - 1977 - 1978 - 1979 - 1980 - 1981 - 1982 - 1983 - 1984 - 1985 - 1986 - 1987 - 1988 - 1989 - 1990 - 1991 - 1992 - 1993 - 1994 - 1995 - 1996 - 1997 - 1998 - 1999 - 2000 - 2001 - 2002 - 2003 - 2004 - 2005 - 2006 - 2007 - 2008 - 2009 - 2010 - 2011 - 2012 - 2013 - 2014 - 2015 - 2016 - 2017 - 2018 - 2019 - 2020 - 2021 - 2022 - 2023 - 2024 - 2025 - 2026

=== History of Bangladesh, by region ===
- History of Dhaka
- History of Chittagong
- History of Rajshahi
- History of Khulna
- History of Barisal
- History of Sylhet
- History of Cumilla
- History of Rangpur
- History of Narayanganj
- History of Gazipur
- History of Feni

=== History of Bangladesh, by subject ===
- History of aviation in Bangladesh
- History of banking in Bangladesh
- LGBT history in Bangladesh
- Military history of Bangladesh
  - Military coups in Bangladesh
- Political history of Bangladesh
  - 2006–2008 Bangladeshi political crisis

== Culture of Bangladesh ==
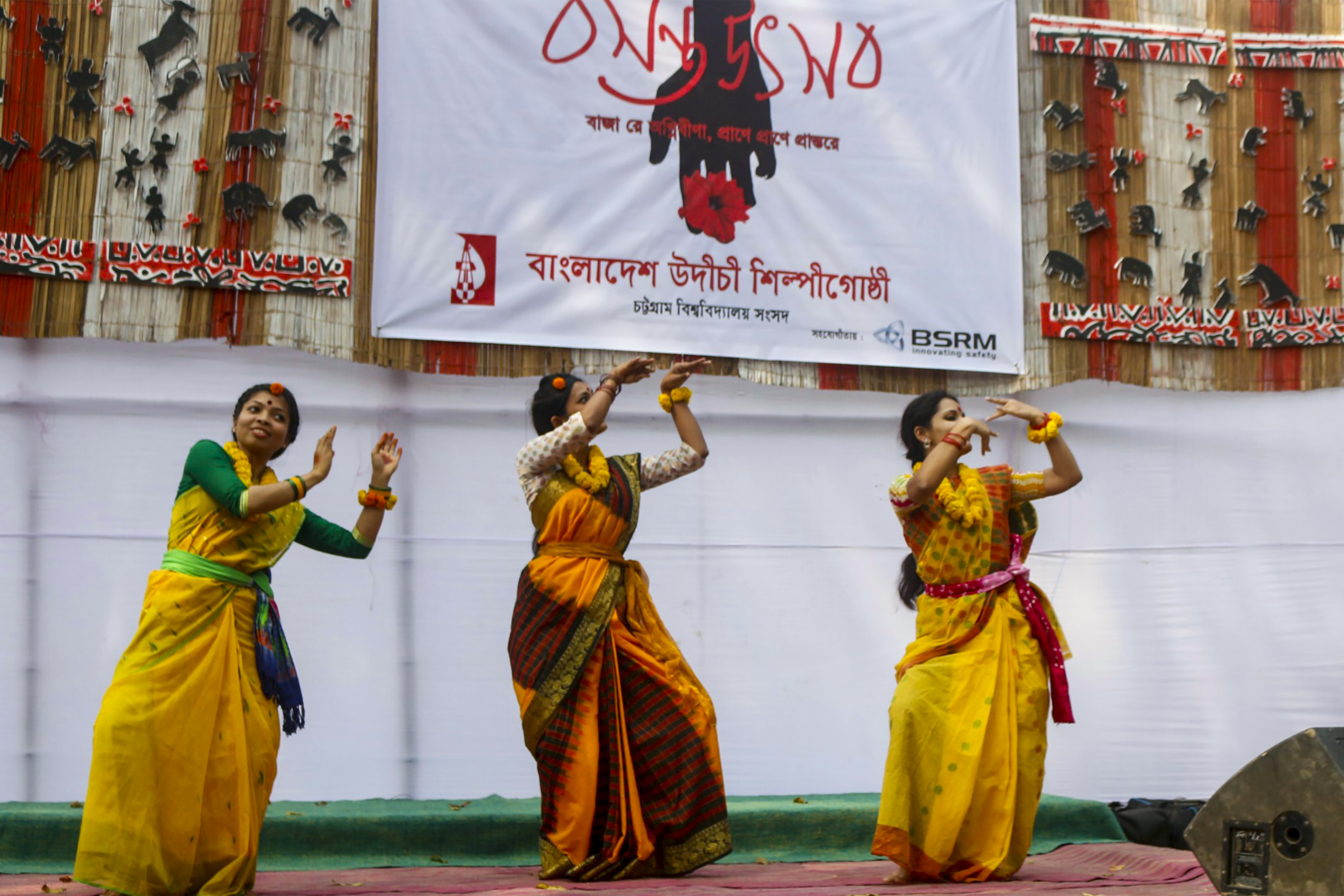
Dance in celebration of Pohela Falgun at the University of Chittagong

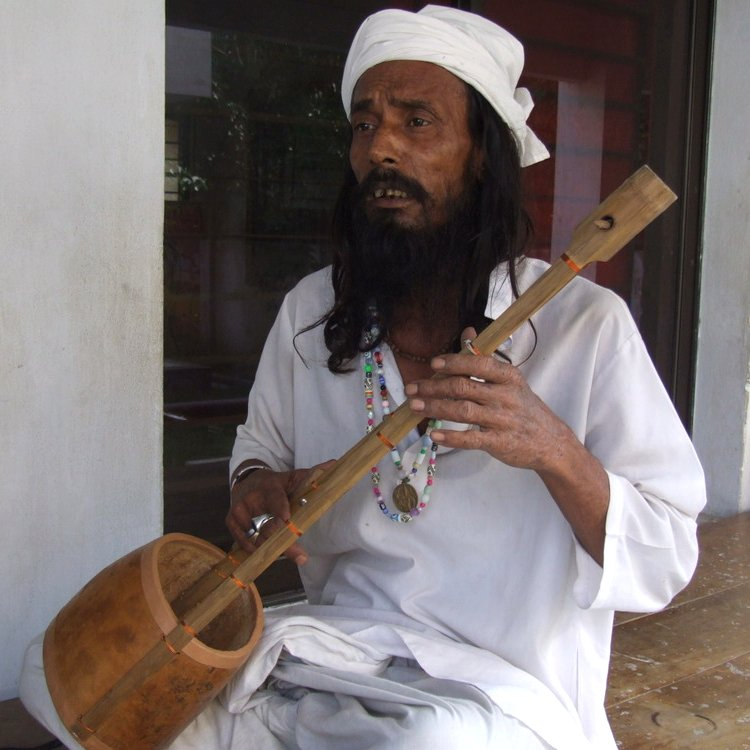
A baul playing the ektara at the shrine of Lalon in Kushtia

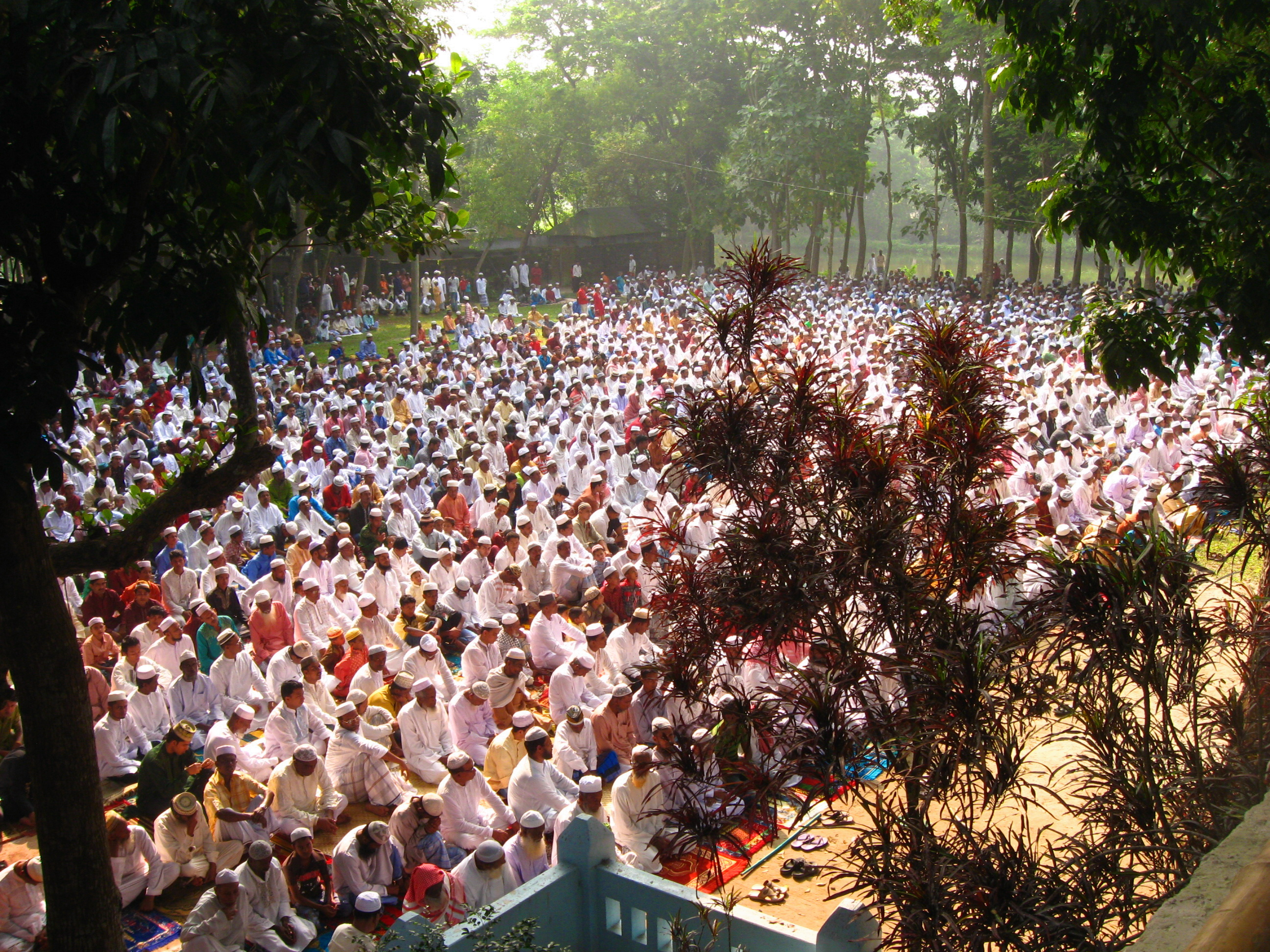
A rural congregation for Eid-al-Fitr prayers

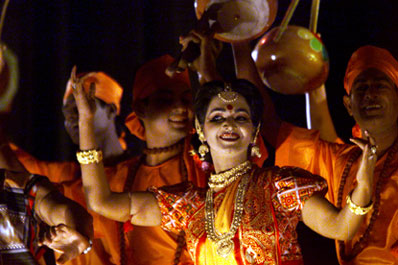
Bangladeshi artists performing in a dance show.

The music dance styles of Bangladesh may be divided into three categories: classical, folk, modern

- Architecture of Bangladesh
  - Architecture of Bengal
  - Buildings in Bangladesh
    - Jatiya Sangsad Bhaban
    - Ahsan Manzil
    - Dhaka Central Jail
    - Hoseni Dalan
    - Curzon Hall
    - Lalbagh Fort
    - Taj Mahal Bangladesh
    - Novo Theatre, Dhaka
  - Monuments in Bangladesh
    - National Martyrs' Memorial
    - Martyred Intellectuals Memorial
    - Shaheed Minar
- Clothing of Bangladesh
  - Dhakai
  - Jamdani
  - Lungi
  - Rajshahi silk
  - Saree
- Cuisine of Bangladesh
  - Hilsa
  - Jackfruit
- Festivals in Bangladesh
  - Madhu Purnima
  - Poush Sangkranti
- Languages of Bangladesh
  - Bengali language
  - Bishnupriya Manipuri language
  - Chittagonian language
  - Manipuri language
  - Sylheti language
- Museums in Bangladesh
  1. Ahsan Manzil
  2. Bagha Museum
  3. Bangladesh Air Force Museum
  4. Bangladesh Maritime Museum
  5. Bangladesh Bank Taka Museum
  6. Bangladesh Military Museum
  7. Bangladesh National Museum
  8. Birshreshtha Munshi Abdur Rouf Library and Museum
  9. Bogra District Council Museum
  10. Bangabandhu Memorial Museum
  11. Birisiri Upajatya Cultural Academy Museum (Near Mymensingh)
  12. Chandpur Fisheries Museum
  13. Comilla Rammala Museum
  14. Cox's Bazar Fisheries Museum
  15. Children's Museum (Shishu Academy)
  16. Dhaka Nagar Jadughar
  17. Dinajpur Museum
  18. Ethnological Museum of Chittagong
  19. Fish Museum & Biodiversity Centre
  20. Folk Heritage Museum (Bangla Academy)
  21. Faridpur Museum
  22. Jamalpur Estate Museum, Thakurgoan
  23. Kangal Harinath Memorial Museum
  24. Kushtia Municipal Museum
  25. Khulna Divisional Museum
  26. Kishoreganj Museum
  27. Lalbagh Fort
  28. Liberation War Museum
  29. Lokayon Museum
  30. Archaeological Museum of Mahasthangarh
  31. Mainamati
  32. Michel Modhusudhan Dutt Museum
  33. Museum of Rajas'
  34. Museum of Independence, Dhaka
  35. National Museum of Science and Technology
  36. Museum of Geological Survey of Bangladesh
  37. Mymensingh Museum
  38. National Art Gallery (Bangladesh)
  39. National Museum of Science and Technology
  40. Natore Rajbari
  41. Osmani Museum
  42. Panchagarh Rocks Museum
  43. Philatelic Museum
  44. Bangladesh Police Liberation War Museum
  45. Postal Museum
  46. Rangpur Museum
  47. Sunamganj Hasan Raja Museum
  48. Sonargaon Bangladesh Folk Art Museum (Near Dhaka)
  49. Shilaidaha Kuthibari Memorial Museum (Near Kushtia)
  50. Shahjadpur Kacharibari Memorial Museum (Near Pabna)
  51. Tajhat Palace
  52. Tribal Museum
  53. Varendra Research Museum
  54. Zainul Abedin Museum
  55. Zia Memorial Museum
  56. Sreemangal Tea Resort and Museum
  57. Bengal Center
  58. K.B. Ahsanullah (R:) Museum
  59. Paharpur Archaeological Museum
- National symbols of Bangladesh
  - Coat of arms of Bangladesh
  - Flag of Bangladesh
  - National anthem of Bangladesh
- Prostitution in Bangladesh
- Public holidays in Bangladesh
- List of museums in Bangladesh
- Bangladesh Scouts
- Video gaming in Bangladesh
- List of World Heritage Sites in Bangladesh
- List of Buddhist viharas in Bangladesh

=== Art in Bangladesh ===
Art in Bangladesh

- Cinema of Bangladesh
- Theatre in Bangladesh

==== Literature of Bangladesh ====
- Bengali literature

===== Folklore of Bangladesh =====
- Behula
- Maimansingha Gitika
- Puthi

===== Historical Books =====
- Charyapada
- Bangladesh: A Legacy of Blood
- Banker to the Poor

===== Novels =====
Bengali novels

- General fiction
  - Bishad Shindhu
  - Lajja
  - Pak Sar Jamin Sad Bad
  - Sultana's Dream
- Bengali science fiction

===== Poems =====
Bengali poetry

- Banalata Sen
- Chharpatra
- Nolok

==== Music of Bangladesh ====
- Music of Bangladesh
  - Musical genres
    - Baul
    - Bhawaiya
    - Bhatiali
    - Gombhira
  - Musical instruments
    - Dhol
    - Dotara
    - Ektara
    - Tabla

==== Sculptures in Bangladesh ====
- Aparajeyo Bangla
- Shabash Bangladesh
- Shapla Square

=== Media in Bangladesh ===
- Television in Bangladesh

==== Newspapers in Bangladesh ====
Newspapers in Bangladesh

- Local newspapers in Bangladesh
- The Daily Ittefaq
- Prothom Alo
- Kishore Bangla
- The Daily Sangram
- Suprobhat Bangladesh
- The Independent (Bangladesh)
- The Daily Star
- Dhaka Tribune

==== Television in Bangladesh ====
- List of Bangladeshi television and radio channels
- List of television stations in Bangladesh

===== Television channels in Bangladesh =====
- ATN Bangla
- Bangladesh Television
- Channel One (Bangladesh)
- Channel S
- Ekushey Television
- NTV (Bangladesh)
- RTV

===== Television programmes in Bangladesh =====
- Bohubrihi
- Ittadi
- Jodi Kichhu Mone Na Koren
- Mati O Manush
- Songsoptok
- Shomoyer Kotha

==== Radio in Bangladesh ====
- Bangladesh Betar
- Radio Amar
- Radio Today
- Radio Foorti
- Radio Metrowave

=== People of Bangladesh ===
People of Bangladesh

- Ethnic groups in Bangladesh
  - Indigenous peoples in Bangladesh
    - Bom people
    - Bengali people
    - Biharis in Bangladesh
    - Chakma people
    - Garo people
    - Jumma people
    - Kuki people
    - Marma people
    - Tanchangya people
    - Zo people
  - Diaspora in Bangladesh
    - Armenians in Bangladesh
    - Chinese people in Bangladesh
    - Indians in Bangladesh
- Other groups
  - LGBT history in Bangladesh
  - Street children in Bangladesh
  - Women in Bangladesh

=== Religion and beliefs in Bangladesh ===
- Religion in Bangladesh
  - Bahá'í Faith in Bangladesh
  - Buddhism in Bangladesh
    - Bengali Buddhists
    - Sangharaj Nikaya
    - Mahasthabir Nikaya
    - Bangladesh Bauddha Kristi Prachar Sangha
    - Barua Buddhist Institutes in India and Bangladesh
    - Buddhist viharas in Bangladesh
  - Christianity in Bangladesh
    - Christian Commission for Development in Bangladesh
    - Protestantism in Bangladesh
    - Roman Catholicism in Bangladesh
      - Cathedrals in Bangladesh
      - Roman Catholic dioceses in Bangladesh
  - Hinduism in Bangladesh
    - Hindu temples in Bangladesh
  - Islam in Bangladesh
    - Ahmadiyya in Bangladesh
    - Bishwa Ijtema
- Irreligion in Bangladesh
- Secularism in Bangladesh

==== Mosques ====
- Baitul Mukarram
- Binat Bibi Mosque
- Sixty Dome Mosque
- Star Mosque

==== Temples, churches and pagodas ====
- Buddha Dhatu Jadi
- Church of Bangladesh
- Dhakeshwari Temple
- Kamalapur Dharmarajika Bauddha Vihara
- Kantajew Temple
- Ramna Kali Mandir
- Somapura Mahavihara
- Temple of King Kangsa Narayan

==== Mausoleums ====
- Shah Jalal
- Mausoleum of Ziaur Rahman

=== Sports in Bangladesh ===
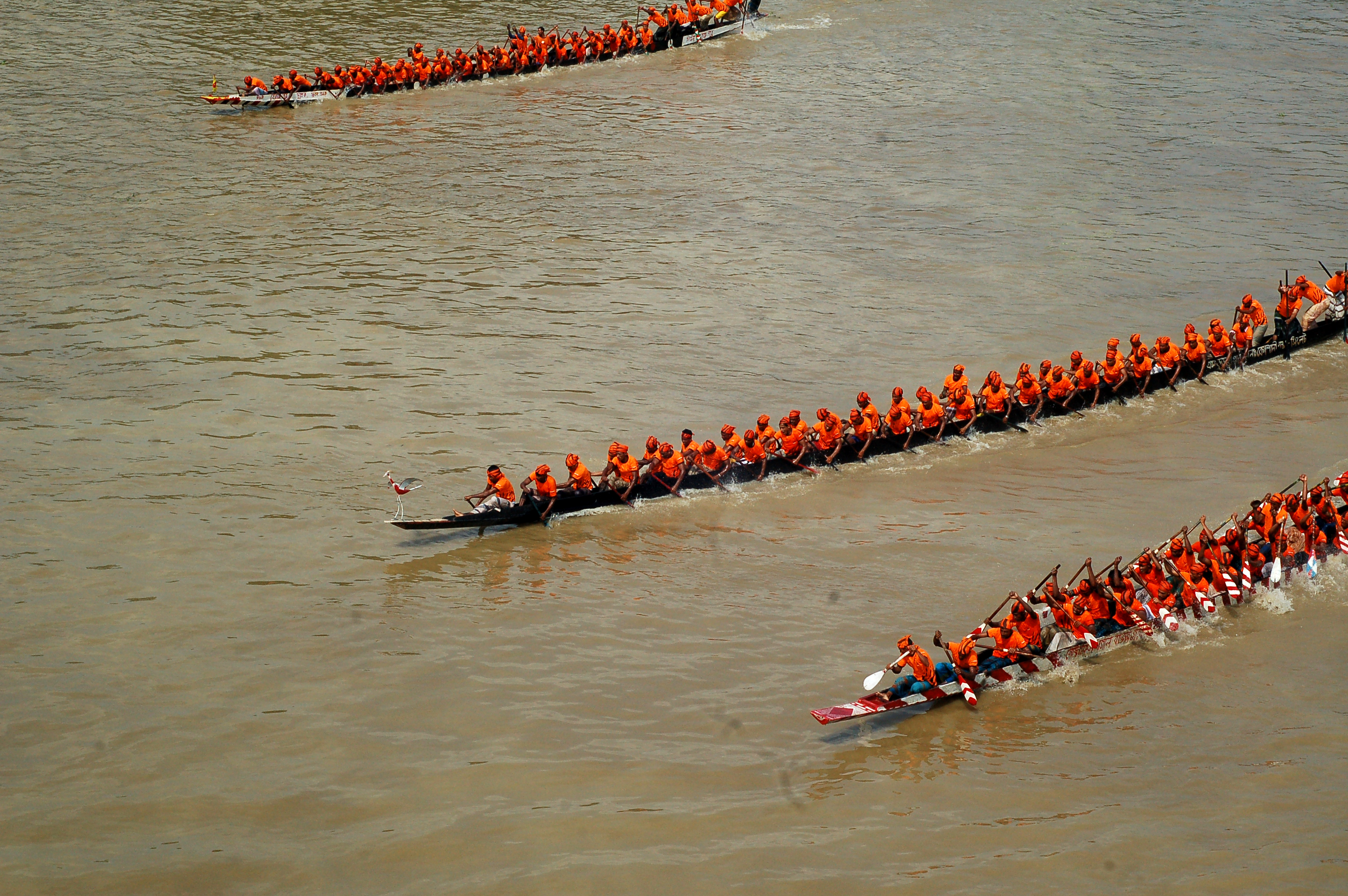
Nouka Baich, traditional boat paddling sport

Sports in Bangladesh

- Football in Bangladesh
  - Bangladesh national football team
  - Bangladesh Professional Football League
  - Football venues
    - National Stadium, Dhaka
- Bangladesh at the Olympics
- Stadiums in Bangladesh
- Bangladesh Davis Cup team
- Bangladeshi kabaddi team
- Abahani Krira Chakra
- Brothers Union
- Mohammedan Sporting Club (Dhaka)
- Muktijoddha
- Bangladesh at the 2006 Commonwealth Games

==== Cricket in Bangladesh ====
Cricket in Bangladesh

- Cricket teams in Bangladesh
  - Bangladesh national cricket team
    - Bangladesh National Cricket Team Statistics and Records
  - Bangladesh national women's cricket team
  - Bangladeshi U-19 cricket team
  - Bangladesh A cricket team
    - Bangladesh A cricket team in England in 2005
  - Bangladesh Under-19 cricket team
  - Central Zone cricket team (Bangladesh)
  - East Zone cricket team (Bangladesh)
  - North Zone cricket team (Bangladesh)
  - South Zone cricket team (Bangladesh)
- Bangladesh Cricket Board
- Cricket leagues in Bangladesh
  - National Cricket League (Bangladesh)
  - Bangladesh NCL (National Cricket League) Twenty20
  - Bangladesh NCL (National Cricket League) Twenty20 Tournament 2010
- Cricket players in Bangladesh
  - List of Bangladesh ODI cricketers
  - List of Bangladesh Test cricketers
  - List of Bangladesh cricketers who have taken five-wicket hauls on Test debut
  - List of Bangladesh Twenty20 International cricketers
  - List of Bangladesh national cricket captains
- Cricket venues in Bangladesh
  - Cricket grounds in Bangladesh
  - Sher-e-Bangla Cricket Stadium
  - Chittagong Divisional Stadium
  - Fatullah Osmani Stadium
  - Shaheed Chandu Stadium
- Biman Bangladesh Airlines cricket team

===== History of cricket in Bangladesh =====
History of cricket in Bangladesh

- Bangladesh Women's cricket team in India in 2012–13
- By season
  - 2000–01 Bangladeshi cricket season
  - 2001–02 Bangladeshi cricket season
  - 2002–03 Bangladeshi cricket season
  - 2003–04 Bangladeshi cricket season
  - 2004–05 Bangladeshi cricket season
  - 2005–06 Bangladeshi cricket season
  - 2006–07 Bangladeshi cricket season
  - 2007–08 Bangladeshi cricket season
  - 2008–09 Bangladeshi cricket season
  - 2012–13 Bangladeshi cricket season
  - 2013–14 Bangladeshi cricket season
- Away from home
  - Bangladesh cricket team in Australia in 2003
  - Bangladesh cricket team in Australia in 2008
  - Bangladeshi cricket team in England in 2005
  - Bangladeshi cricket team in England in 2010
  - Bangladeshi cricket team in Ireland and Netherlands in 2012
  - Bangladeshi cricket team in Ireland in 2010
  - Bangladeshi cricket team in Kenya in 1983–84
  - Bangladeshi cricket team in Kenya in 2006
  - Bangladeshi cricket team in New Zealand in 1997–98
  - Bangladeshi cricket team in New Zealand in 2001–02
  - Bangladeshi cricket team in New Zealand in 2007–08
  - Bangladeshi cricket team in New Zealand in 2009–10
  - Bangladeshi cricket team in Pakistan in 1986
  - Bangladeshi cricket team in Pakistan in 2001–02
  - Bangladeshi cricket team in Pakistan in 2003
  - Bangladeshi cricket team in Pakistan in 2003–04
  - Bangladeshi cricket team in Pakistan in 2007–08
  - Bangladeshi cricket team in Pakistan in 2008
  - Bangladeshi cricket team in Scotland in 2010
  - Bangladeshi cricket team in South Africa in 2008–09
  - Bangladeshi cricket team in Sri Lanka in 1985–86
  - Bangladeshi cricket team in Sri Lanka in 2002
  - Bangladeshi cricket team in Sri Lanka in 2005–06
  - Bangladeshi cricket team in Sri Lanka in 2007
  - Bangladeshi cricket team in Sri Lanka in 2012–13
  - Bangladeshi cricket team in the West Indies in 2004
  - Bangladeshi cricket team in the West Indies in 2009
  - Bangladeshi cricket team in the West Indies in 2014
  - Bangladeshi cricket team in West Bengal in 1983–84
  - Bangladeshi cricket team in Zimbabwe in 2000–01
  - Bangladeshi cricket team in Zimbabwe in 2003–04
  - Bangladeshi cricket team in Zimbabwe in 2006
  - Bangladeshi cricket team in Zimbabwe in 2006–07
  - Bangladeshi cricket team in Zimbabwe in 2009
  - Bangladeshi cricket team in Zimbabwe in 2011
  - Bangladeshi cricket team in Zimbabwe in 2013
- Visiting teams
  - Australian cricket team in Bangladesh in 2005–06
  - Australian cricket team in Bangladesh in 2011
  - Danish XI cricket team in Bangladesh in 1989–90
  - England A cricket team in Bangladesh in 1994–95
  - England A cricket team in Bangladesh in 1999–2000
  - English cricket team in Bangladesh in 2003–04
  - English cricket team in Bangladesh in 2009–10
  - Indian cricket team in Bangladesh in 2000–01
  - Indian cricket team in Bangladesh in 2004–05
  - Indian cricket team in Bangladesh in 2007
  - Indian cricket team in Bangladesh in 2009–10
  - Indian cricket team in Bangladesh in 2014
  - Irish cricket team in Bangladesh in 2007–08
  - Karachi Airlines Gymkhana cricket team in Bangladesh in 1992–93
  - Kenyan cricket team in Bangladesh in 2005–06
  - Marylebone Cricket Club cricket team in Bangladesh in 1976–77
  - Marylebone Cricket Club cricket team in Bangladesh in 1980–81
  - Marylebone Cricket Club cricket team in Bangladesh in 1999–2000
  - New Zealand cricket team in Bangladesh in 2004–05
  - New Zealand cricket team in Bangladesh in 2008–09
  - New Zealand cricket team in Bangladesh in 2010–11
  - New Zealand cricket team in Bangladesh in 2013–14
  - Pakistani cricket team in Bangladesh in 1979–80
  - Pakistani cricket team in Bangladesh in 2001–02
  - Pakistani cricket team in Bangladesh in 2011–12
  - Scottish cricket team in Bangladesh in 2006–07
  - South African cricket team in Bangladesh in 2003
  - South African cricket team in Bangladesh in 2007–08
  - Sri Lankan cricket team in Bangladesh in 1977–78
  - Sri Lankan cricket team in Bangladesh in 1984–85
  - Sri Lankan cricket team in Bangladesh in 2005–06
  - Sri Lankan cricket team in Bangladesh in 2008–09
  - Sri Lankan cricket team in Bangladesh in 2013–14
  - West Bengal cricket team in Bangladesh in 1982–83
  - West Indian cricket team in Bangladesh in 1999–2000
  - West Indian cricket team in Bangladesh in 2002–03
  - West Indian cricket team in Bangladesh in 2011–12
  - West Indian cricket team in Bangladesh in 2012–13

== Economy and infrastructure of Bangladesh ==
Economy of Bangladesh

- Economic rank, by nominal GDP (2007): 58th (fifty-eighth)
- Agriculture in Bangladesh
  - Jute trade
  - Fishing in Bangladesh
  - Forestry in Bangladesh
  - Rice production in Bangladesh
- Banking in Bangladesh
  - History of banking in Bangladesh
  - Banks in Bangladesh
    - National Bank of Bangladesh
- Ceramics industry in Bangladesh
- Construction industry in Bangladesh
  - Green building in Bangladesh
- Electronics industry in Bangladesh
  - Information technology in Bangladesh
- Companies of Bangladesh
- Currency of Bangladesh: Taka
  - ISO 4217: BDT
  - Paisa
- Bangladesh Export Processing Zone Authority
- Food industry in Bangladesh
- Pharmaceutical industry in Bangladesh
- Poverty in Bangladesh
  - Street children in Bangladesh
- Real estate in Bangladesh
- Retail industry in Bangladesh
  - Online shopping in Bangladesh
- Science and technology in Bangladesh
- Steel industry in Bangladesh
- Stock exchanges in Bangladesh
  - Chittagong Stock Exchange
  - Dhaka Stock Exchange
- Textile industry in Bangladesh
- Tourism in Bangladesh
- Water supply and sanitation in Bangladesh
  - Waste management in Bangladesh

=== Communications in Bangladesh ===
- Postal system in Bangladesh

==== Telecommunications in Bangladesh ====
Telecommunications in Bangladesh

- Internet in Bangladesh
  - .bd
  - .বাংলা
- Bangladesh Telecommunication Regulatory Commission
- Grameen Telecom
- Telecom System in Bangladesh
- Phone service in Bangladesh
  - Telephone numbers in Bangladesh
  - Phone companies
    - Landphone companies
      - Bangladesh Telegraph and Telephone Board
      - OneTel
    - Mobile phone companies
      - TeleTalk
      - Grameenphone
      - Banglalink
      - Robi
      - Airtel
      - Citycell

=== Energy in Bangladesh ===
Energy in Bangladesh

- Electricity sector in Bangladesh
  - Power stations in Bangladesh
- Energy policy of Bangladesh
- Natural gas in Bangladesh
- Nuclear energy in Bangladesh

=== Transport in Bangladesh ===
Transport in Bangladesh

- Rickshaws in Bangladesh
- Country boats in Bangladesh
- Vehicular transport in Bangladesh
  - Automotive industry in Bangladesh
  - Driving license in Bangladesh
  - Road system in Bangladesh
    - Bridges in Bangladesh
      - Hardinge Bridge
      - Jamuna Bridge
      - Lalon Shah Bridge
    - Roads in Bangladesh
      - Highways in Bangladesh
- Rail transport in Bangladesh

==== Air transport in Bangladesh ====
- History of aviation in Bangladesh

===== Airports in Bangladesh =====
Airports in Bangladesh

- Shahjalal International Airport
- Tejgaon Airport
- Shah Amanat International Airport
- Osmani International Airport
- Ishurdi Airport
- Saidpur Airport
- Jessore Airport
- Cox's Bazar Airport
- Shah Makhdum Airport
- Barisal Airport

==== Marine transport in Bangladesh ====
- Shipbuilding in Bangladesh

===== Seaports in Bangladesh =====
- Port of Chittagong
- Port of Mongla
- Port of Payra

== Education in Bangladesh ==
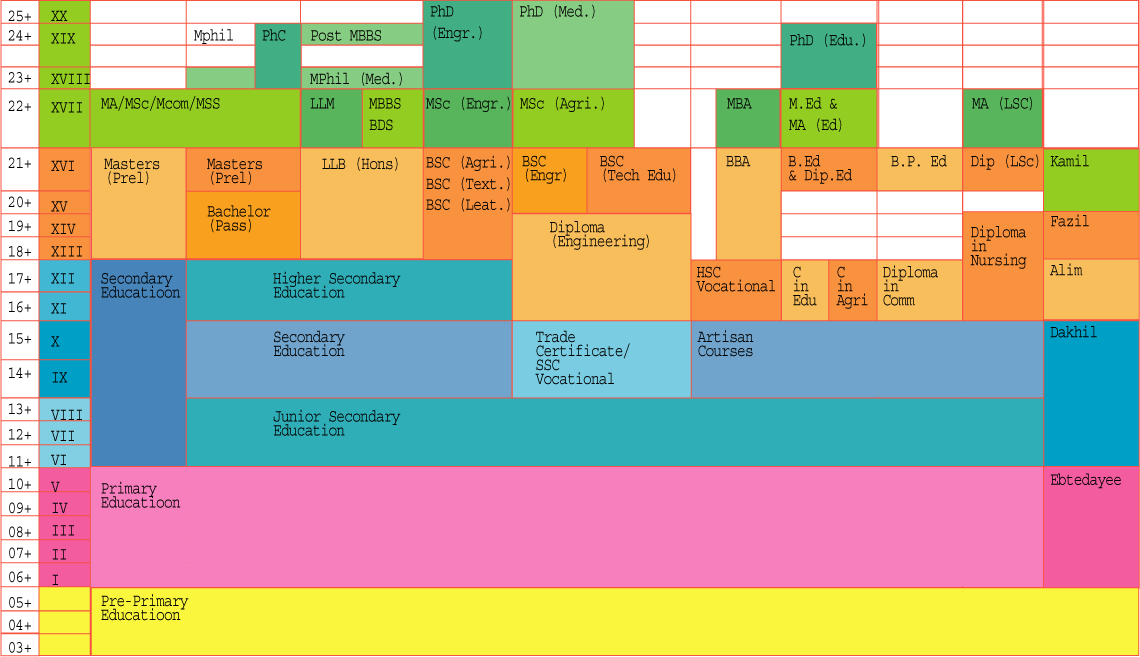
A Bangladesh education system chart

Education in Bangladesh

- Academic grading in Bangladesh
- University Grants Commission (Bangladesh)
- Bangladesh Sanskrit and Pali Education Board

=== Schools in Bangladesh ===
- List of schools in Bangladesh
- Aga Khan School, Dhaka
- Azimpur Girls' High School
- Bangladesh Air Force Shaheen College
- Bangladesh International School and College
- Bogra Zilla School
- Brother Andre High School (Noakhali)
- Chittagong Collegiate School and College
- Chittagong Government High School
- Hazi Mohammad Mohsin Government High School
- Daulatpur Mohsin High School
- Dawood Public School
- Dhaka Collegiate School
- Dhaka Residential Model College
- Dhanmondi Government Boys' High School
- Dhanmondi Tutorial
- Dr. Khastagir Government Girls' School
- Government Laboratory High School
- Holy Cross Girls' High School (Dhaka)
- Holy Cross High School (Bandura)
- Ideal School and College
- Jalalabad Cantonment Public School and College
- Jessore Zilla School
- Madhupur Rani Bhabani Model High School
- Madhupur Shahid Smrity Higher Secondary School
- Masjid Mission Academy
- Mastermind School
- Monipur High School
- Motijheel Model High School and College
- Pogose School
- Police Lines School and College, Rangpur
- Rajshahi Collegiate School
- Rangpur Zilla School
- Saint Joseph Higher Secondary School (Dhaka)
- Saint Joseph School of Industrial Trades (Dhaka)
- Saint Nicholas High School
- Scholastica School
- Sherpur Government Victoria Academy
- St Gregory's School (Dhaka)
- Sunbeams School
- Udayan Higher Secondary School
- Viqarunnisa Noon School and College
- Willes Little Flower School

=== Colleges in Bangladesh ===
- Architecture schools in Bangladesh
- Business schools in Bangladesh
- Dental schools in Bangladesh
- General colleges
  - Madhupur Shahid Smrity Higher Secondary School
  - Madhupur College
  - Abdul Kadir Mollah City College
  - B A F Shaheen College
  - Brajalal College
  - Brojomohun College
  - Chittagong College
  - Chittagong Pali College
  - Dhaka City College
  - Dhaka College
  - Dhaka Residential Model College
  - Murari Chand College
  - SOS Hermann Gmeiner College
  - Notre Dame College (Dhaka)
  - Rajshahi College
  - Eden Girls' College
  - Government Hazi Mohammad Mohshin College
  - Government Saadat College
  - Notre Dame College, Dhaka
  - Carmichael College
  - Savar Model College
  - Jalalabad Cantonment Public School & College
  - Sherpur Government College
  - Agricultural University College

==== Cadet Colleges in Bangladesh ====
- Barisal Cadet College
- Comilla Cadet College
- Faujdarhat Cadet College
- Feni Girls Cadet College
- Jhenaidah Cadet College
- Joypurhat Girls Cadet College
- Mymensingh Girls Cadet College
- Mirzapur Cadet College
- Pabna Cadet College
- Rajshahi Cadet College
- Rangpur Cadet College
- Sylhet Cadet College

==== Medical colleges in Bangladesh ====
- Chittagong Medical College
- Comilla Medical College
- Dhaka Medical College and Hospital
- Dinajpur Medical College
- Mymensingh Medical College
- Rajshahi Medical College
- Rangpur Medical College
- Sir Salimullah Medical College
- M.A.G. Osmani Medical College, Sylhet
- Faridpur Medical College
- more...

=== Universities in Bangladesh ===
Universities in Bangladesh

- University of Dhaka
- University of Rajshahi
- University of Chittagong
- Jahangirnagar University
- Bangladesh University of Engineering and Technology
- Bangladesh University of Textiles
- National University
- Dhaka University of Engineering and Technology
- Shanto Mariam University of Creative Technology
- American International University-Bangladesh
- East West University
- ASA University Bangladesh
- International Islamic University, Chittagong
- BRAC University
- Chittagong University of Engineering & Technology
- Hajee Mohammad Danesh Science and Technology University
- Islamic University of Technology
- Jatiya Kabi Kazi Nazrul Islam University
- Khulna University
- Khulna University of Engineering and Technology
- Mawlana Bhashani Science and Technology University
- Noakhali Science and Technology University
- North South University
- Patuakhali Science and Technology University
- Rajshahi University of Engineering and Technology
- Shahjalal University of Science and Technology
- University of Asia Pacific (Bangladesh)
- Ahsanullah University of Science and Technology
- Bangladesh Medical University
- University of Science & Technology Chittagong
- Asian University of Bangladesh
- Primeasia University
- Daffodil International University
- University of Development Alternative
- more...

=== Madrassahs in Bangladesh ===
- Quomi
- Al-Markazul Islami As-Salafi
- Paschim Jinnahgarh Nuria Alim Madrasah

== Tourism in Bangladesh ==
Tourism in Bangladesh

== Health in Bangladesh ==
Health in Bangladesh

- Abortion in Bangladesh
- Biotechnology and genetic engineering in Bangladesh
- Blood donation in Bangladesh
- HIV/AIDS in Bangladesh
- Hospitals in Bangladesh
- Pharmaceutical industry in Bangladesh
- Suicide in Bangladesh

== See also ==
- Outline of Asia
- Outline of geography
- Accord on Fire and Building Safety in Bangladesh
- Accounting in Bangladesh
- Architecture school in Bangladesh
- Cadet Colleges in Bangladesh
- Climate change in Bangladesh
- Daylight saving time in Bangladesh
- Floods in Bangladesh
- Rugby union in Bangladesh
- Scouting and Guiding in Bangladesh
- Nepalis in Bangladesh
- Rickshaw art in Bangladesh
- Shakrain Festival in Bangladesh
- Textile schools in Bangladesh
- Tri-Series in Bangladesh in 2008–09
- Tri-Series in Bangladesh in 2009–10
- Tri-nation series in Bangladesh in 2008
- Worldwide Protests for Free Expression in Bangladesh
- List of parliamentary constituencies of Bangladesh
- List of Qawmi Madrasas in Bangladesh
- Conglomerates in Bangladesh
- Endangered languages in Bangladesh
- Festivals in Bangladesh
- List of fishes in Bangladesh
- Football clubs in Bangladesh
- Hartal in Bangladesh
- Hotels in Bangladesh
- Institutes in Bangladesh
- Journalists killed in Bangladesh
- Libraries in Bangladesh
- Massacres in Bangladesh
- Mosques in Bangladesh
- Postal codes in Bangladesh
- List of sectors in Bangladesh Liberation War
- Shopping malls in Bangladesh
- Slums in Bangladesh
- Tallest buildings in Bangladesh
- Zoos in Bangladesh
- Rohingya refugees in Bangladesh
- Bengali Muslims

== Miscellaneous ==
- Padamdi Nawab Estate
- Bangladesh Standard Time

=== General culture ===
- Eid al-Adha
- Eid ul-Fitr
- Laylat al-Qadr
- Durga Puja
- Pohela Boishakh
- Nobanno
