= List of Buddhist viharas in Bangladesh =

This is a list of ancient Buddhist viharas and archeological sites in Bangladesh.

Name	Native Name	Image	Region
Agrapuri Vihara	অগ্রপুরী বিহার		Naogaon, Rajshahi Division
Bhitargarh Vihara	ভিতরগড় বিহার		Panchagarh, Rangpur Division
Sitakot Vihara	সীতাকোট বিহার		Dinajpur, Rangpur Division
Bikrampur Vihara	বিক্রমপুর বিহার		Bikrampur, Dhaka Division
Halud Vihara	হলুদ বিহার		Naogaon, Rajshahi Division
Jagaddala Mahavihara	জগদ্দল মহাবিহার		Naogaon, Rajshahi Division
Nateshwar Deul	নাটেশ্বর দেউল		Tongibari, Dhaka Division
Pandit Vihara	পণ্ডিত বিহার		Anwara, Chittagong Division
Shalban Vihara	শালবন বিহার		Comilla, Chittagong Division
Somapura Mahavihara	সোমপুর মহাবিহার/ পাহাড়পুর বিহার		Naogaon, Rajshahi Division
Vasu Vihara	ভাসু বিহার		Bogra, Rajshahi Division
Ananda Vihara	আনন্দ বিহার		Kobari, Comilla
Bhoja Vihara	ভোজবিহার		Kobari, Comilla
