= Sri Lankan cricket team in Bangladesh in 1984–85 =

Sri Lankan Cricket Team in Bangladesh in 1984–85
	Sri Lanka	Bangladesh
- Dates: 15 March – 17 March 1985
Captains	Duleep Mendis	Gazi Ashraf

The Sri Lankan national team stopped in Dhaka in March 1985 on their return journey from Australia. The tour consisted of a single three-day fixture. Several notable individual performances were recorded during the match, particularly by members of the home side

== Scores in brief ==
Date	Match	Venue			Result
15–17 March	3-Day Match	Dhaka	Bangladesh 139 (Lipu 39, Munir 39, Somachandra 4/28) & 152/6 (Lipu 45, Raquibul 32)	Sri Lanka 429/9 (Decl.) (R. Madugalle 95, Ratnayeke 79*, Jahangir 4/89)	Match Drawn

Batting first, Bangladesh scored 139 in the first innings. The newly appointed skipper Gazi Ashraf Lipu and Munir both scored 39. (Tariquzzaman Munir was at that time at the top of his form. Just days earlier he had scored the highest individual score in domestic cricket, 308 for Dhaka University in the semi-final of the National Cricket Championship against Dhaka District. There he had shared a partnership of 447 with Athar Ali Khan).

For Bangladesh the tail collapsed against the left-arm spin of the veteran Somachandra de Silva, who took 4/28.

In reply, the Lankan innings started disastrously as Amal Silva and Sidath Wettimuny both fell cheaply to medium pacer Jahangir Shah. The middle order however, repaired the damage and Sri Lanka eventually declared at 429/9. Ranjan Madugalle narrowly missed his hundred (95), Ravi Ratnayeke, better known as a fast bowler, blasted 79*. Jahangir Shah finished with 4/89.

Bangladesh batted in their 2nd innings and saved the match by scoring 152/6. Skipper Gazi Ashraf again led from the front, scoring a 45, and the veteran Raquibul Hasan proved his worth to the side with 32.

== Importance ==
This game is significant in Bangladesh's cricket history for a number of reasons. First, the draw achieved was highly creditable. Specially, the memory of the disaster that Bangladesh had faced against Sri Lanka during the 1977–78 season was partly erased. Second, this was the first time Gazi Ashraf captained the national side. He was to remain captain until 1990. During this period Bangladesh cricket went through its most important changes.

Finally, three youngsters, Minhajul Abedin, Athar Ali Khan and Gholam Nousher Prince, played for Bangladesh in this match. Although all of them failed to impress they all went on to play vital roles in later years.
