= Geology of Bangladesh =

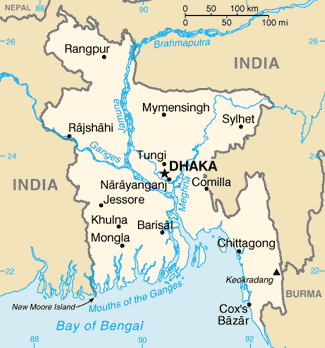
Geography of Bangladesh

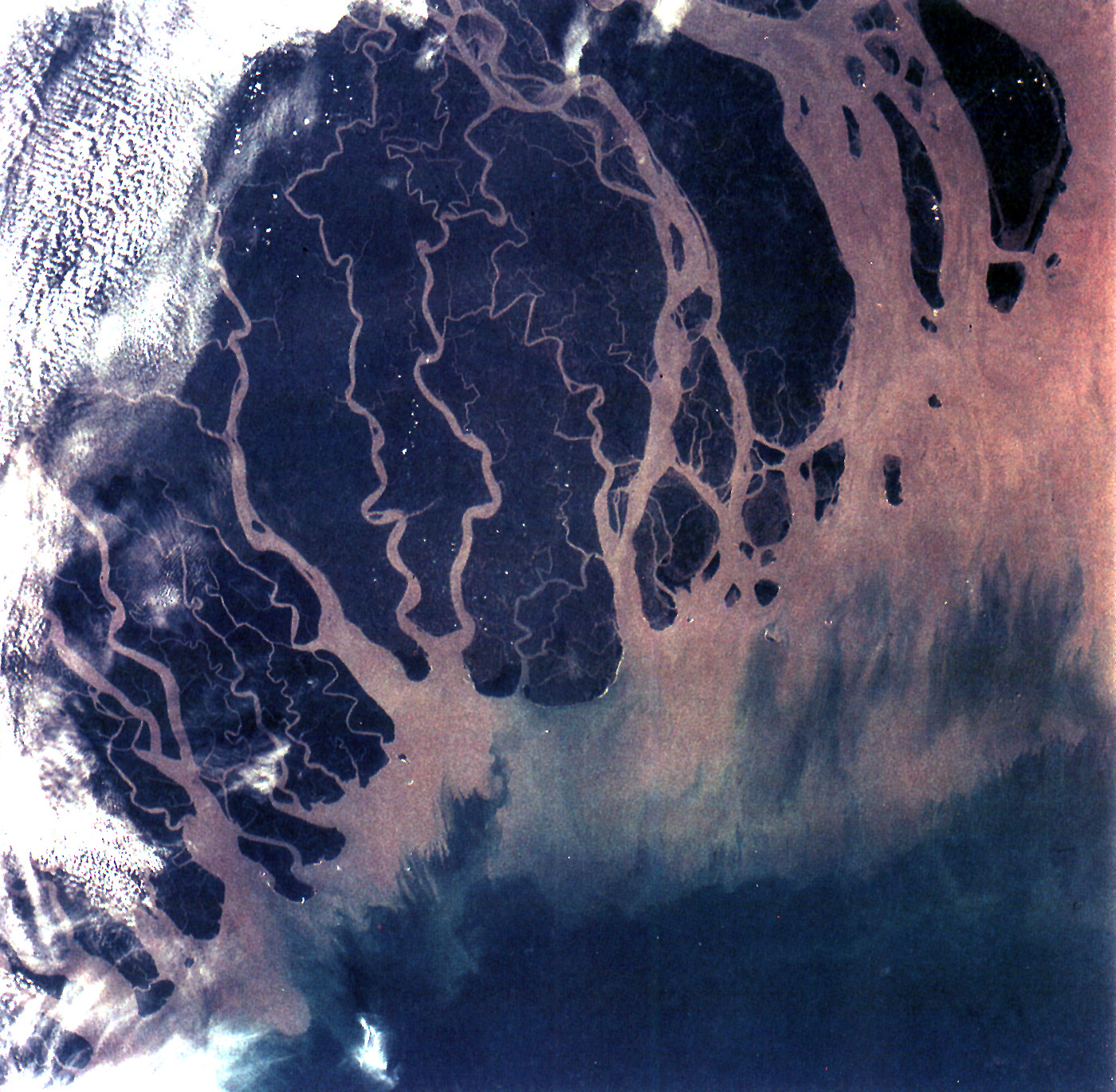
Ganges River Delta

The Geology of Bangladesh is affected by the country's location, as Bangladesh is mainly a riverine country. It is the eastern two-thirds of the Ganges and Brahmaputra river delta plain stretching to the north from the Bay of Bengal. There are two small areas of slightly higher land in the north-centre and north-west composed of old alluvium called the Madhupur Tract and the Barind Tract, and steep, folded, hill ranges of older (Tertiary) rocks along the eastern border.

The downwarping of the basement rocks under central and southern Bangladesh result from the pressure of sediments that have been accumulating since the Cretaceous period, mostly a large quantity of carbonate. In the Late Eocene epoch the conditions in the Bay of Bengal changed and these deposits ceased.

== Structural and tectonic geology ==
In the late Cretaceous, the Indian Plate collided with the Eurasian Plate, after the Indian and African Plate split to form the Indian Ocean during the Triassic. The tectonic collision in the Cretaceous led to the differentiation of marginal marine embayments within the proto–Bengal Basin along the northeastern margin of the Indian Plate, while narrow seaways from the ocean fed water into these shallow marine depressions. As ridges formed in the Tethys Ocean on the other side of the Shillong and Dinajpur Shields, small island arcs formed locally. The Tura sandstone, Sylhet limestone and Kopili shale were all deposited during an intermediate shallow marine depositional environment in between these tectonic changes.

A renewed period of collision and tectonic activity began with the Himalayan orogeny in the Eocene. The gulfs became shallower and the east-west Sylhet strike affected sedimentary rocks along with the Bogra strike. As tectonic activity slowed somewhat, a river delta environment deposited of the other significant Cenozoic sedimentary units. Renewed tectonism in the Pliocene formed the Dinajpur Shield into a graben, relative to the horst of the Shillong Plateau and Mikir Hills. The Pliocene orogeny led into the Pleistocene ice age, resulting in regional extinction of many large mammals. A final period of uplift raised the red clay table lad 30 to 100 feet, along with St. Martin's Island in the Pleistocene.

== Geologic history ==
Surface rocks and stratigraphy in Bangladesh were formed during the Cenozoic and rock units date to all epochs of the Cenozoic except for the Oligocene, which is poorly preserved. Drilling and mineral prospecting has revealed deeper rock units that record the geologic history of Bangladesh prior to the Cenozoic as far back as the Precambrian.

=== Precambrian ===
Two wells, drilled in 1959 and 1960 in search of oil by the Standard Vacuum Oil Company near Kuchma and in the northern Bogra district first revealed Precambrian rocks beneath Bangladesh. The Precambrian Basement Complex is composed of gneiss, granite, granodiorite and smaller sequences of schistose, amiphibolite and gabbro. Precambrian rocks are preserved in northwest Bangladesh as the Dinajpur Platform and Dinajpur Shield. The Dinajpur Platform is contiguous with the Indian Shield while a graben and faulting along the Ganges and Jamuna separates the Dinajpur Shield from the Shillong and Chhotonagpur plateaus.

=== Paleozoic ===
In the Permian period, Bangladesh was part of the supercontinent Gondwana. The existence of Gondwana was first theorized by Rupert Jones, a European coal mine operator who in 1829 published a hypothesis about coal fields beneath Bangladesh. Gondwana came into use in the 1870s, named after the Gond people.

The Kuchma formation preserves the early Permian, with a sequence of sandstone, shaly sandstone, black carbonaceous shale and white sandstone. These sediments are highly porous and hold extensive water reserves, but because of their depth are highly saline and poor quality for agriculture. The late Permian Paharpur formation was first recognized through 11 boreholes in 1965 near the Paharpur coal field. The formation is primarily gray, feldspathic sandstone and some deposits of kaolin material.

=== Mesozoic ===
The Late Jurassic Rajmahal formation differs from other primarily sedimentary sequences, with hornblende basalt, olivine basalt and andesite as well as associated ash beds, tuff and agglomerate and small one meter thick sedimentary bed which preserve fossilized plants. The early Cretaceous Sibganj formation includes white kaolinite sandstone, iron-rich trapwash sandstone, red shale, claystone, clay, tuff, and sedimentary beds fossilized plants. Ostracod fossils were used to establish its age.

=== Cenozoic ===
The Tura sandstone is a very thick unit, formed during the early and middle Cenozoic. It is named after the Tura range in the Tura district. Very little of the sandstone is visible at the surface. It forms three small hills at Takerghat, although these are blanketed in alluvium. A small pillar in Lalghat and an exposure by a stream are the only places where the Tura sandstone is visible. Early efforts to date the sandstone with microfossils in the 1960s failed but other researchers had better luck with pollen. The Sylhet limestone preserves additional rock units such as shale and sandstone, indicative of a shallow marine environment and contains 69 species of foraminifera, while the Upper Eocene Kopili formation contains pollen from mangrove swamps. Oligocene units like the Burdwaran formation and Memari formation show signs of ocean transgression, and an estuarine environment.

== Stratigraphy ==
The stratigraphy of Bangladesh begins with Precambrian units below ground. Geologists have found an unconformity between Precambrian and Paleozoic units. Gondwanan sedimentary units, including the early Permian Kuchma and late Permian Paharpur range between 494 meters and 1.2 kilometers in thickness. Ascending the stratigraphic column, a second unconformity separates Permian units from late Jurassic Rajmahal basalts and early Cretaceous Sibganj sedimentary rocks, with thicknesses between 131 and 546 meters. The late Cretaceous is absent due to an unconformity. The coal, limestone and shale-laden Tura sandstone, deposited from the Paleocene to the Eocene is 377 meters thick, and lies beneath the middle Eocene Sylhet limestone and late Eocene Kopili shale. An additional unconformity separates Eocene and Oligocene Jennum and Renji sandstone and shale sequences, which are 646 meters in thickness. Lower Bhuban, Middle Bhuban, Upper Bhuban and Boka Bil are ascending units of early Micoense siltstone and sandstone, which give way to the middle Miocene Tipam Sandstone and Girujan Clay. An unconformity occurs before late Miocene sequences including the Dupi Tila sandstone and claystone, with another unconformity between the Dupi Tila units and Pliocene Dihing claystone and silty sandstone. Pleistocene St. Martin's limestone and Madhapur clay are separated from Pliocene units by an unconformity as well from Holocene sand, silt, clay, peat and coral alluvium.

== History of geologic research ==
The Geological Survey of India did not focus much on geological mapping in Bengal during the British Raj. The Geological Survey of Pakistan, when Bangladesh was East Pakistan focused on searching for mineral deposits and the Bengali government has continued that pattern. Compared to many countries, the geology of Bangladesh is poorly mapped and understood.

== Natural resource geology ==
Most natural resources in Bangladesh have been discovered since independence from Britain, many in the 1950s and 1980s. Geologists found deltaic peat deposits in 1953, the St. Martin limestone in 1958, coal, glass-quality sand and the Takerghat limestone in 1959 as well as additional coal, limestone, kaolin and sand along with Precambrian rocks in the Rajshahi Division from 1963 to 1982. Thirteen gas fields and an oil field were discovered between 1959 and 1987.
