= Bangladeshi cricket team in Sri Lanka in 1985–86 =

Mens cricket tour

The Bangladeshi national cricket team toured Sri Lanka in March and April 1986 to play in a Limited Overs International (LOI) competition against the Sri Lankan and Pakistani national cricket teams, which was won by Sri Lanka. Bangladesh were captained by Gazi Ashraf.
