= Bangladesh women's cricket team in India in 2012–13 =

Bangladesh Women's in India in 2012–13
	India	Bangladesh
- Dates: 2 April 2013 – 12 April 2013
Captains	Harmanpreet Kaur	Salma Khatun

One Day International series
- Results: India won the 3-match series 3–0
Most runs	Harmanpreet Kaur (195)	Salma Khatun (132)
Most wickets	E.Bisht (8)	Rumana Ahmed (5)

Twenty20 International series
- Results: India won the 3-match series 3–0
Most runs	Poonam Raut (106)	Salma Khatun (68)
Most wickets	E Bisht (4)	Salma Khatun (5)

The Bangladesh Women's cricket team toured India for the first time from 2 to 12 April 2013. They played a three-match Twenty20 International series and a three-match One Day International series against India. India won both series 3–0.

== Squads ==
India	Bangladesh
Harmanpreet Kaur (c); Poonam Raut (vc); Ekta Bisht; Archana Das; Anagha Deshpande; Ritu Dhrub; Thirush Kamini; Smriti Mandhana; Mona Meshram; Nagarajan Niranjana; Swagatika Rath; Shubhlakshmi Sharma; Sneha Deepthi; Sushma Verma; Poonam Yadav	Salma Khatun (c); Farzana Haque (vc); Shohaly Akther; Ayesha Akhter; Fahima Khatun; Jahanara Alam; Lata Mondal; Nuzhat Tasnia; Panna Ghosh; Ritu Moni; Rumana Ahmed; Shahanaz Parvin; Shukhtara Rahman; Tazia Akhter; Yasmin Boishakhi

== T20I series ==
=== 1st T20I ===
2 April
Scorecard

India; 143/3 (20 overs)	v	Bangladesh; 94/7 (20 overs)
Poonam Raut 75 (56); Salma Khatun 3/12 (4 overs)		Salma Khatun 49 * (43); MR Meshram 1/9 (3 overs)

India Women won by 49 runs
Reliance Stadium, Vadodara
Umpires: AY Dandekar and S Shankar

- Bangladesh Women won the toss and elected to field.
- Shohaly Akther, Shahanaz Parvin (both Ban), R Dhrub and V Sneha (both Ind) made their T20I debuts.

=== 2nd T20I ===
4 April
Scorecard

Bangladesh; 88/4 (20 overs)	v	India; 91/3 (18 overs)
Shukhtara Rahman 29 (24); E Bisht 1/21 (4 overs)		MR Meshram 29 (33); Panna Ghosh 2/18(4 overs)

India Women won by 7 wickets
Reliance Stadium, Vadodara
Umpires: AY Dandekar and S Shankar

- Bangladesh Women won the toss and elected to bat.
- S Rath (Ind) made her T20I debut.

=== 3rd T20I ===
5 April
Scorecard

India; 123/9 (20 overs)	v	Bangladesh; 113/7 (20 overs)
S Mandhana 39 (36); Salma Khatun 2/30(4 overs)		Lata Mondal 32 (27); P Yadav 3/21(4 overs)

India Women won by 10 runs
Reliance Stadium, Vadodara
Umpires: AY Dandekar and S Shankar

- India Women won the toss and elected to bat.
- Ayesha Akhter, Fahima Khatun, Yasmin Boishakhi (all Ban), S Mandhana, S Verma and P Yadav (all Ind) made their T20I debuts.

== ODI series ==
=== 1st ODI ===
8 April
Scorecard

Bangladesh; 194/9 (50 overs)	v	India; 196/5 (49.2 overs)
Salma Khatun 75 * (82); E Bisht 2/27 (10 overs)		Harmanpreet Kaur 63 * (100); Jahanara Alam 2/31 (9 overs)

India Women won by 5 wickets
Sardar Patel Stadium, Motera, Ahmedabad
Umpires: UV Gandhe and J Madanagopal

- Bangladesh Women won the toss and elected to bat.
- Fahima Khatun, Shahanaz Parvin (both Ban), R.Dhrub and S.Rath (both Ind) made their ODI debuts.

=== 2nd ODI ===
10 April
Scorecard

India; 256/6 (50 overs)	v	Bangladesh; 210/9 (50 overs)
Harmanpreet Kaur 103 * (100); Jahanara Alam 2/38 (10 overs)		Rumana Ahmed 75 (94); E Bisht 3/34 (10 overs)

India Women won by 46 runs
Sardar Patel Stadium, Motera, Ahmedabad
Umpires: UV Gandhe and J Madanagopal

- India Women won the toss and elected to bat.
- Shohaly Akther (Ban) and S. Mandhana (Ind) made their ODI debuts.

=== 3rd ODI ===
12 April
Scorecard

India; 154 (48.3 overs)	v	Bangladesh; 96 (41.1 overs)
S. Rath 30 (39); Rumana Ahmed 4/20 (10 overs)		Salma Khatun 22 (46); P Yadav 3/15 (10 overs)

India Women won by 58 runs
Sardar Patel Stadium, Motera, Ahmedabad
Umpires: UV Gandhe and J Madanagopal

- India Women won the toss and elected to bat.
- V. Sneha Deepthi and P. Yadav (Ind) made their ODI debuts.
