= Bangladesh-Korea Technical Training Centre =

Location
- Mirpur Road, Darus-salam Dhaka, Dhaka-1216; Bangladesh
- Coordinates: 23.7974°N 90.3559°E

Information
- Established: 1942
- Website: www.bkttcdhaka.gov.bd

Bangladesh-Korea Technical Training Centre is a technical training centre in Dhaka, Bangladesh. This institution is located in Mirpur, Dhaka. It was founded in 1942 as a training centre for veterans of World War II. It runs under the Bureau of Manpower Employment and Training (BMET). This government organization provides various courses to make people more skilful for their future workplace.

It received grants from the Korea International Cooperation Agency (KOICA), the internal development agency of South Korea.
