= Street children in Bangladesh =

Orphaned and abandoned children in Bangladesh

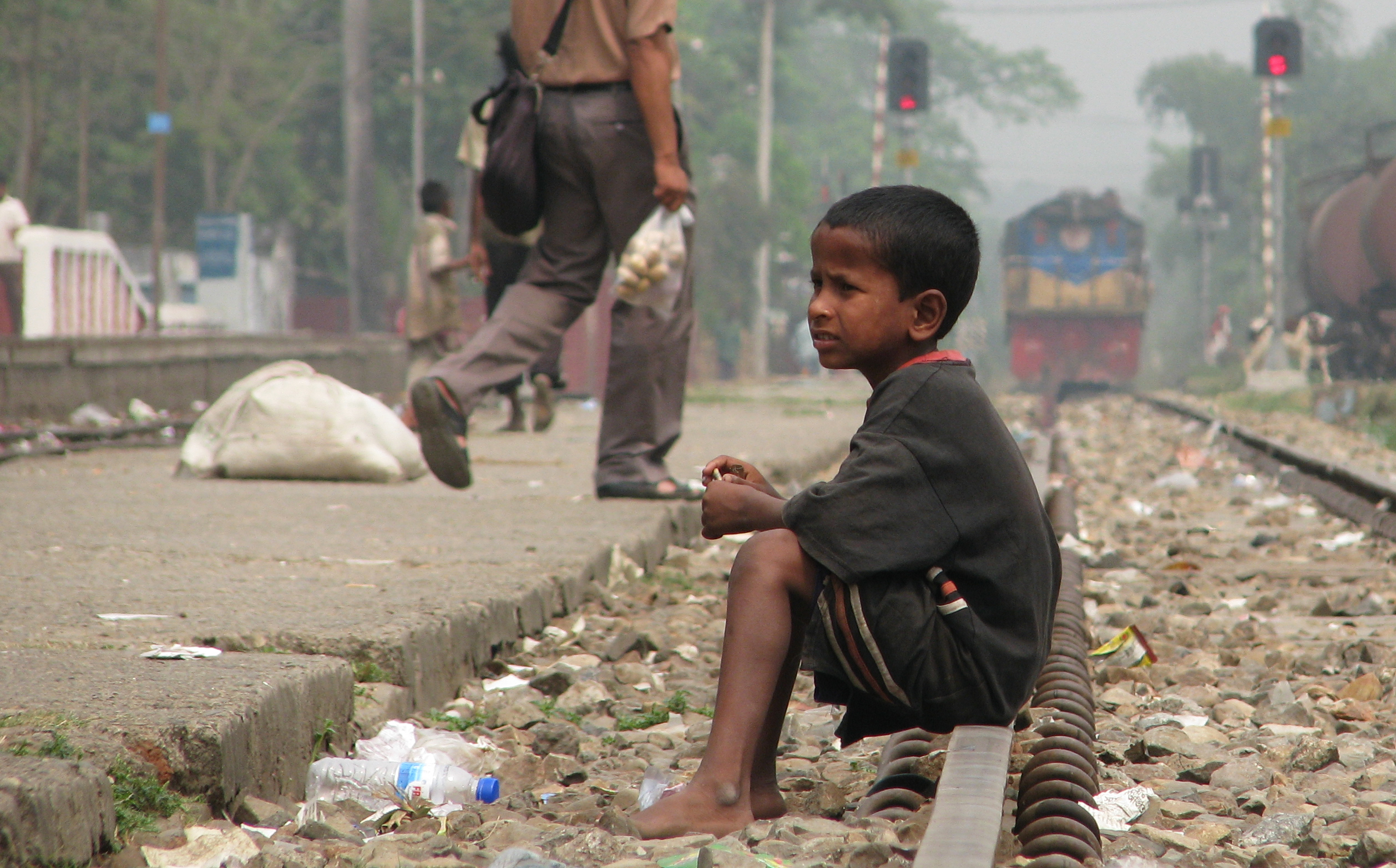
A street child in Srimangal Railway Station, Bangladesh.

A street child in Bangladesh is a young person "for whom the street (in the widest sense of the word, including unoccupied dwellings, wasteland, etc.) has become his or her habitual abode and/or source of livelihood; and who is inadequately protected, supervised, or directed by responsible adults”.

== Definition ==
Street children sell things on the streets or do other jobs because their parents earn little money or don't work. It's estimated that more than 600,000 children live on the streets in Bangladesh, of whom 75% are in the capital of Dhaka.

In a country ranked 135th on the Human Development Index and where 50% of the population live below the poverty line, these children represent the absolute lowest level in the social hierarchy. Bangladesh is the most densely populated nation in the world; as its population has increased, the number of street children has also increased to an estimated 4 million.

== Causes ==
Bangladeshi children are being pushed onto the streets due to extreme poverty, lack of access to contraception, and lack of education. From a governmental perspective, childhood poverty in Bangladesh may also be the result of corruption, dysfunction, and neglect.

Street children do not have definite living or sleeping places, and many die young due to neglect, malnutrition, and disease. They can sometimes be seen selling flowers, books, or knick-knacks on the street, especially to cars stuck in traffic. As elsewhere, street children often do not have access to healthy foods, which leads to the consumption of unhygienic food. Starvation is an ever-present problem in the region, and each year, approximately 110,000 children die of water-borne diseases in Bangladesh.

== Organised crime ==
Street children often have to work to survive. Some do so within the lower echelons of organised crime groups, whose leaders are called mastaans. These groups operate in slums across the country, particularly in Dhaka.

In her book, The Gangs of Bangladesh: Mastaans, Street Gangs and ‘Illicit Child Labourers’ in Dhaka, criminologist Sally Atkinson-Sheppard conducted an in-depth study about the involvement of street children in organised crime.

== Organisations serving street children ==
Street children often do not have the means to earn money because they are not educated. They are sometimes assisted by government agencies and local and international non-governmental organisations.

Mojar School and LEEDO works for street children in Dhaka. INCIDIN Bangladesh has been working for the development of street children, especially those who are abused and sexually exploited. The United Nations Children's Fund (UNICEF) has also provided basic assistance and organised fundraising campaigns to better serve the needs of street children.

== Education ==
In general, street children in Bangladesh cannot go to school and miss out on a proper education. This often leads them to lives of hardship, but some non-government organisations offer educational opportunities to provide them with training in basic subjects.

== See also ==
- Street child
- Street children in the Philippines
- Street children in India
