= Academic grading in Bangladesh =

This article gives a summary of the academic grading systems in Bangladesh. There are two main types of grading systems used. One is the Grade Point Average (GPA), which is commonly used in school & colleges. The other is the Cumulative Grade Point Average (CGPA), which is mostly used at the University Level.

== Grading system in school & college ==
Class interval	Letter grade	Grade point	Remarks
80–100	A+	5.00	Outstanding
70-79	A	4.00	Excellent
60–69	A-	3.50	Very Good
50–59	B	3.00	Good
40–49	C	2.00	Satisfactory
33-39	D	1.00	Poor/Pass
0-32	F	0.00	Fail

== Grading system in university ==
Degree evaluation with class in University (First Class, Second Class, Third Class)

In Bangladesh, the results of bachelor's and master's degrees at public universities can be compared to the British undergraduate degree classification system. Based on CGPA, the class of degree is given as follows:

- CGPA 3.00 to 4.00 = 1st Class
- CGPA 2.25 to 2.99 = 2nd Class
- CGPA 2.00 to 2.24 = 3rd Class

A CGPA of 3.00 or above is considered a First Class Honours degree.

Grading system in Public Universities
Class interval	Letter grade	Grade point	Remarks
80-100	A+	4.00	A Plus
75-79	A	3.75	A Regular
70-74	A-	3.50	A Minus
65-69	B+	3.25	B Plus
60-64	B	3.00	B Regular
55-59	B-	2.75	B Minus
50-54	C+	2.50	C Plus
45-49	C	2.25	C Regular
40-44	D	2.00	
0-39	F	0.00	

Grading system in Private UniversitiesGrading system in North South University
Class interval	Letter grade	Grade point	Remarks
93-100	A	4.00	Excellent
90-92	A-	3.70	
87-89	B+	3.30	
83-86	B	3.00	Good
80-82	B-	2.70	
77-79	C+	2.30	
73-76	C	2.00	Average
70-72	C-	1.70	
67-69	D+	1.30	
60-66	D	1.00	Poor
00-59	F	0.00	
-	W	0.00	Withdraw
-	I	0.00	Incomplete
-	R	0.00	Retaken

Grading system in Independent University, Bangladesh
Class interval	Letter grade	Grade point	Remarks
90-100	A	4.00	Excellent
85-89	A-	3.70	Excellent
80-84	B+	3.30	Good
75-79	B	3.00	Good
70-74	B-	2.70	Good
65-69	C+	2.30	Passing
60-64	C	2.00	Passing
55-59	C-	1.70	Passing
50-54	D+	1.30	Deficient Passing
45-49	D	1.00	Deficient Passing
0-44	F	0.00	Failing

Grading system in BRAC University
Class interval	Letter grade	Grade point
97 - 100	A+ Exceptional	4.00
90 - 96	A Excellent	4.00
85 - 89	A-	3.70
80 - 84	B+	3.30
75 - 79	B Good	3.00
70 - 74	B-	2.70
65 - 69	C+	2.30
60 - 64	C Fair	2.00
57 - 59	C-	1.70
55 - 56	D+	1.30
52 - 54	D Poor	1.00
50 - 52	D-	0.7
<50	F	0.00

Grading system in United International University
Class interval	Letter grade	Remarks	Grade point
90 - 100	A	Outstanding	4.00
86 - 89	A-	Excellent	3.67
82 - 85	B+	Very Good	3.33
78 - 81	B	Good	3.00
74 - 77	B-	Above Average	2.67
70 - 73	C+	Average	2.33
66 - 69	C	Below Average	2.00
62 - 65	C-	Poor	1.67
58 - 61	D+	Very poor	1.33
55 - 57	D	Pass	1.00
<55	F	Fail	0.00

Grading system in University of Liberal Arts Bangladesh
Class interval	Letter grade	Grade point
99-100	A	4.00
97-98	A-	3.20
95-96	B+	3.00
93-94	B	2.90
90-92	B-	2.80
85-89	C	2.00
80-84	C-	1.50
74-79	D	1.00
70-74	D-	1.00
0-70	F	0.00

Grading system in East Delta University
Percentage (marks)	Letter grades	G.P.A.
93% & above	A	4.0
89% – <93%	A-	3.7
86% – <89%	B+	3.3
82% – <86%	B	3.0
79% – <82%	B-	2.7
75% – <79%	C+	2.3
72% – <75%	C	2.0
69% – <72%	C-	1.7
65% – <69%	D+	1.3
60% – <65%	D	1.0
<59%	F	0.0

Grading system in American International University-Bangladesh
Class interval	Letter grade	Grade point
90-100	A+	4.00
85-89.99	A	3.75
80-84.99	B+	3.50
75-79.99	B	3.25
70-74.99	C+	3.00
65-69.99	C	2.75
60-64.99	D+	2.50
50-59.99	D	2.25
0-49.99	F	0.00

Grading system in Private Universities except the above Universities
Class interval	Letter grade	Grade point	Remarks
80-100	A+	4.00	A Plus
75-79	A	3.75	A Regular
70-74	A-	3.50	A Minus
65-69	B+	3.25	B Plus
60-64	B	3.00	B Regular
55-59	B-	2.75	B Minus
50-54	C+	2.50	C Plus
45-49	C	2.25	C Regular
40-44	D	2.00	
0-39	F	0.00	

- North South University, BRAC University, American International University-Bangladesh, United International University, East West University, East Delta University, and University of Liberal Arts Bangladesh follow North American grading standards. So, their grading policies differ from those of typical Bangladeshi universities.
