= List of business schools in Bangladesh =

The following is a list of solely specialized business schools that offer undergraduate, graduate, and postgraduate-level education in the field of business in Bangladesh:

- Army Institute of Business Administration, Sylhet (AIBA)
- Army Institute of Business Administration (AIBA)
- Bangladesh Institute of Bank Management (BIBM)
- Bangladesh Institute of Management (BIM)
- BRAC Business School, BRAC University
- Department of Business Administration General, Bangladesh University of Professionals (Proposed:IBA-BUP)
- Dhaka School of Economics (DScE)
- Business Administration Discipline (BAD), School of Management & Business Administration, Khulna University
- Faculty of Business & Economics, East West University
- Institute of Business Administration, University of Dhaka (IBA-DU)
- Institute of Business Administration, Jahangirnagar University (IBA-JU)
- Institute of Business Administration, University of Rajshahi (IBA-RU)
- School of Business and Economics (SBE), North South University
- School of Management and Business Administration, Shahjalal University of Science and Technology
