= Bangladesh–South Sudan relations =

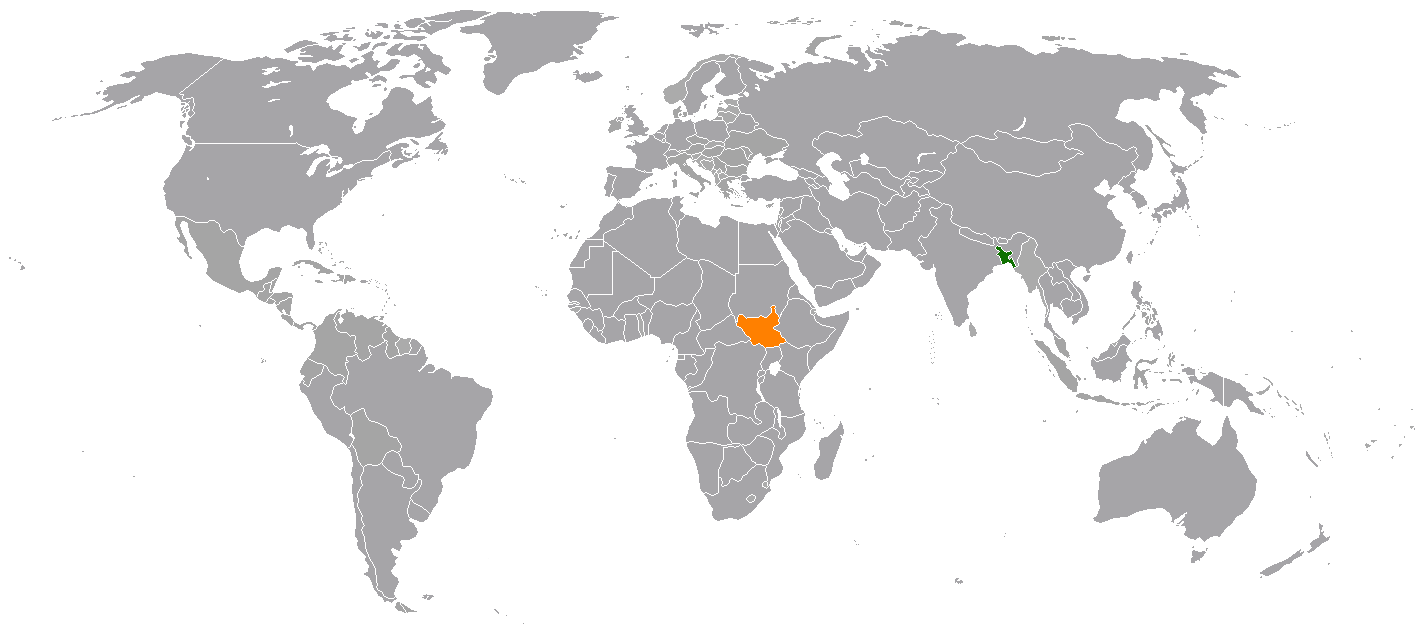

- Bangladesh: South Sudan

Bangladesh–South Sudan relations refer to the bilateral relations between Bangladesh and South Sudan. The core areas of cooperation have been the services of Bangladeshi peacekeepers in South Sudan, involvement of Bangladeshi NGOs in various sectors of social development of South Sudan and the investment of Bangladeshi firms in South Sudan, particularly in the agricultural sector.

== Peacekeepers of Bangladesh ==
Bangladeshi peacekeepers have been working in South Sudan since 2005, Initially as part of UNMIS and since 2011 as part of UNMISS. Apart from law enforcement in South Sudan, Bangladeshi peacekeepers have also extended their contribution to providing free services of specialized doctors among the people as well as building public infrastructure.

== Road Construction & Humanitarian Assistance Project ==
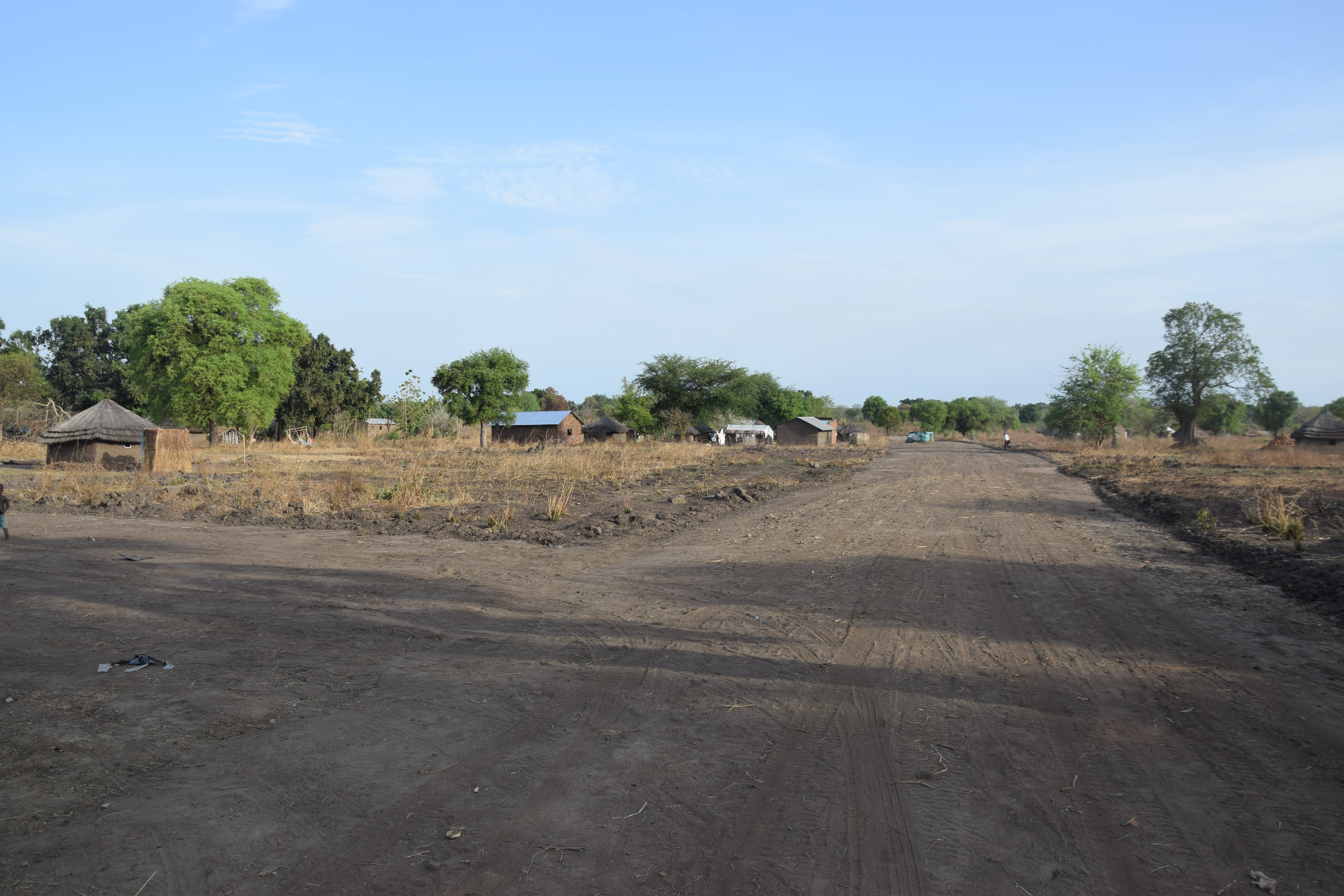
Bangladesh Road in Mundri County of The Republic of South Sudan

Bangladesh Army Engineering Contingent deployed in United Nations Mission in South Sudan (UNMISS) performed a great job in construction, Road Development, Repair, maintenance & Humanitarian Assistance in South Sudan. Juba-Yei, Juba-Mangala, Mundri-Movolo, Mundri-Yambio etc. different road repair and maintenance projects were being conducted by the team. Besides regular works, Bangladesh Engineering team constructed different roads in response of requests by local administrative authorities and conducted various Civil-Military co-operation works as humanitarian assistance. As recognition of their professionalism, co-operative and helping attitude Mundri Administrative Authority proposed to name a road constructed by them as 'Bangladesh Road'(https://www.openstreetmap.org/#map=17/5.34540/30.32733)

== Social development ==
Several Bangladesh based NGOs including BRAC are operating in South Sudan and are mainly working in the areas of microfinance, agricultural development, community development, education etc.

== Agricultural cooperation ==
An MoU has been signed by the Agricultural Ministry of Bangladesh and the Agricultural and Forest Ministry of South Sudan to jointly produce rice, lentil, oil, cotton and other crops on the South Sudanese lands leased by Bangladesh to ensure food security of both the countries. The two countries will also exchange training, technologies and expertise for increased agricultural productivity.

== Trade and investment ==
In 2012, a high level Bangladesh delegation led by Gowher Rizvi visited South Sudan to explore potential areas for Bangladeshi investment in South Sudan.
