= Bangladesh–Sierra Leone relations =

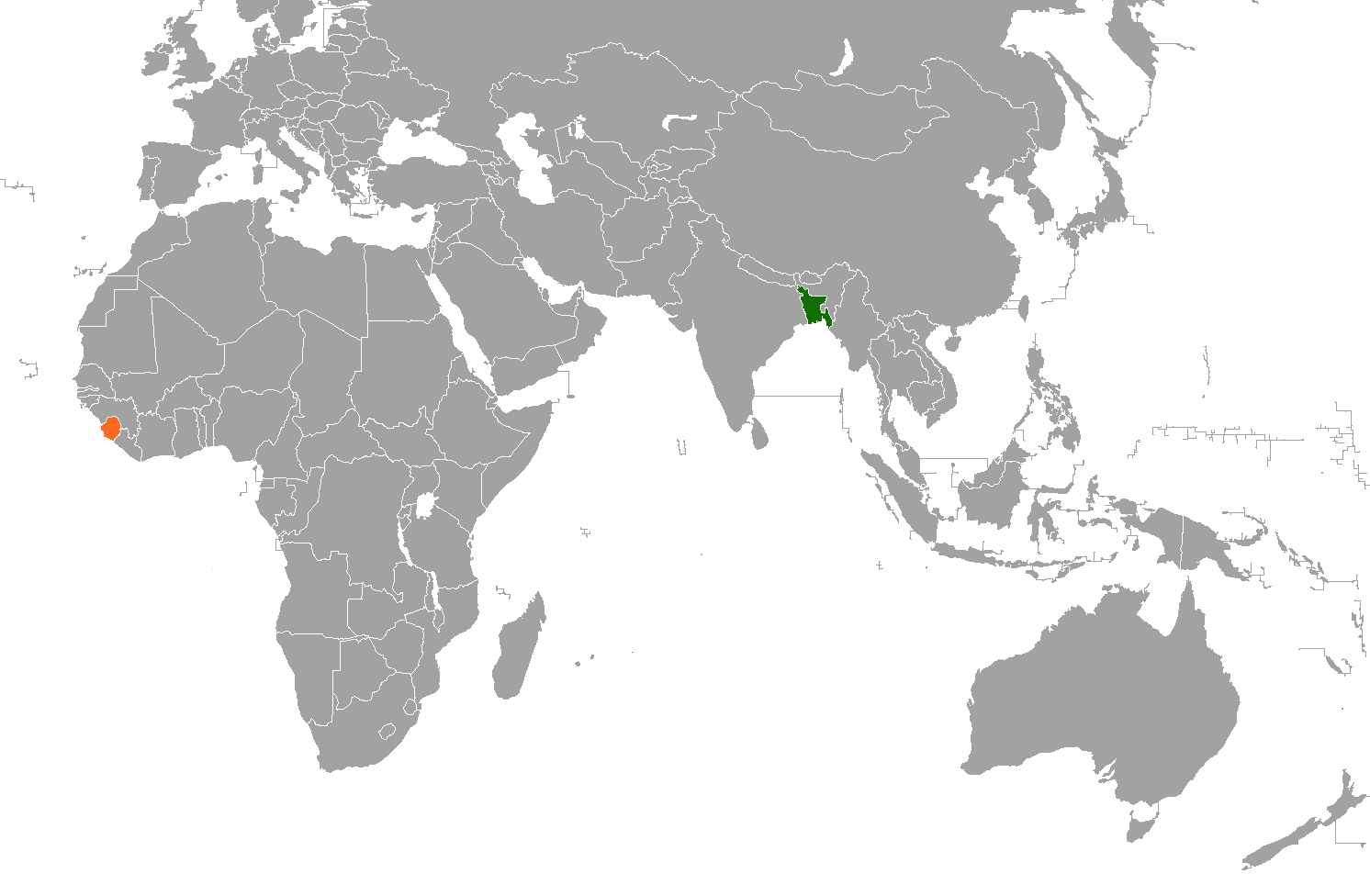

- Bangladesh: Sierra Leone

Bangladesh–Sierra Leone relations refer to the bilateral relations between Bangladesh and Sierra Leone. The relations between the two countries have been largely influenced by the contribution of Bangladesh forces as part of United Nations Peace Keeping mission in Sierra Leone.

== High level visits ==
In 2003, then president of Sierra Leone Ahmad Tejan Kabbah paid an official visit to Bangladesh.

== Bangladesh forces in Sierra Leone ==
Bangladeshi peace keepers played an important role in fighting the rebels during the Sierra Leone Civil War as part of United Nations Mission in Sierra Leone. The peacekeepers have also made vital contributions after the civil war in building important infrastructure. Describing the Bangladeshi peace keepers' contribution, former Sierra Leone President Ahmad Kabbah said,

People of Sierra Leone not only welcome Bangladeshi troops, but they are reluctant to let them leave as well.

== Social development ==
Bangladeshi NGOs including BRAC are operating in Sierra Leone and are working in the areas of microfinance, agricultural development etc.

== Investment ==
Sierra Leone has sought Bangladeshi investments especially in garment, textile and agricultural sectors. There have been major investments in Sierra Leone by Bangladeshi companies in the agricultural sector, the most notable being Bangladesh based Bengal Agro Limited which has invested $50 million and has set up a rubber processing plant in Sierra Leone which is the first of its kind in West Africa.

== See also ==
- Foreign relations of Bangladesh
- Foreign relations of Sierra Leone
