= Waste management in Bangladesh =

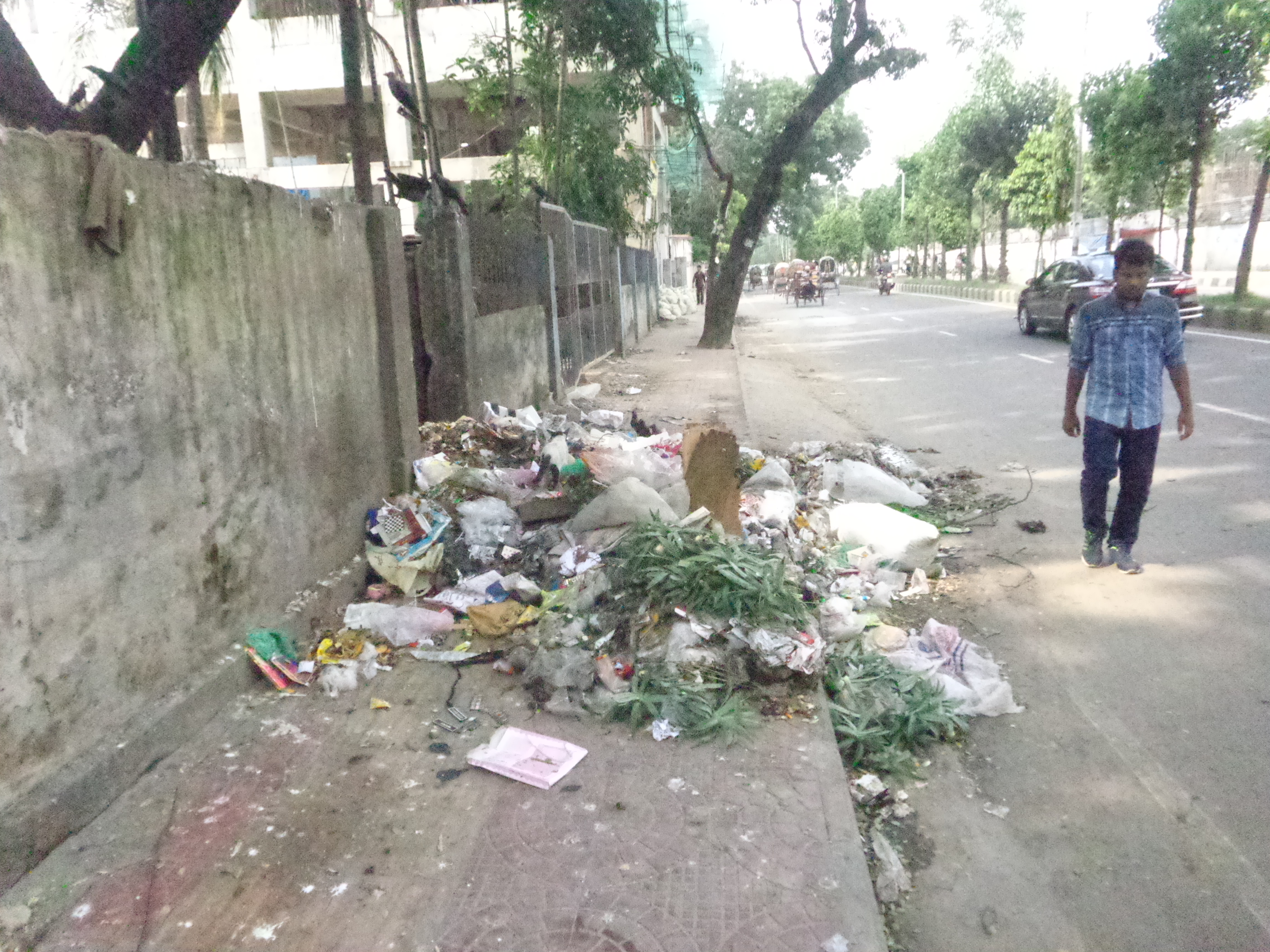
A low rate of waste collection in Bangladesh's major cities results in illegal disposal. This presents a serious environmental and health hazard.

Waste management in Bangladesh faces significant challenges due to the country’s large and rapidly growing population, high population density, and accelerating urbanization. Inadequate waste collection, limited recycling infrastructure, and heavy reliance on informal waste handling systems have resulted in widespread environmental and public health concerns.

Bangladesh is the ninth most populous and twelfth most densely populated country in the world. In particular, the projected urban population growth rate from 2010 to 2015 is 3%. With this population growth, there is an increasing problem of waste management particularly in the larger cities. Currently, according to an UNFPA report, Dhaka is one of the most polluted cities in the world and one of the issues concerned is the management of municipal waste. As for solid waste like paper, carton, metal, plastics, Pet Bottles, e-waste, there was no initiatives to ensure environment friendly recycling. But from 2018 there is a local startup named BD Recycle technologies limited (BRTL) (www.brtlcenter.com) working to digitalized and organize solid waste recycling. BRTL have a webapp and Android app to buy waste from corporates, households, and factories. BRTL collects waste, then sort waste and send to factory end recycler who ensure sustainable recycling.

== Waste creation ==
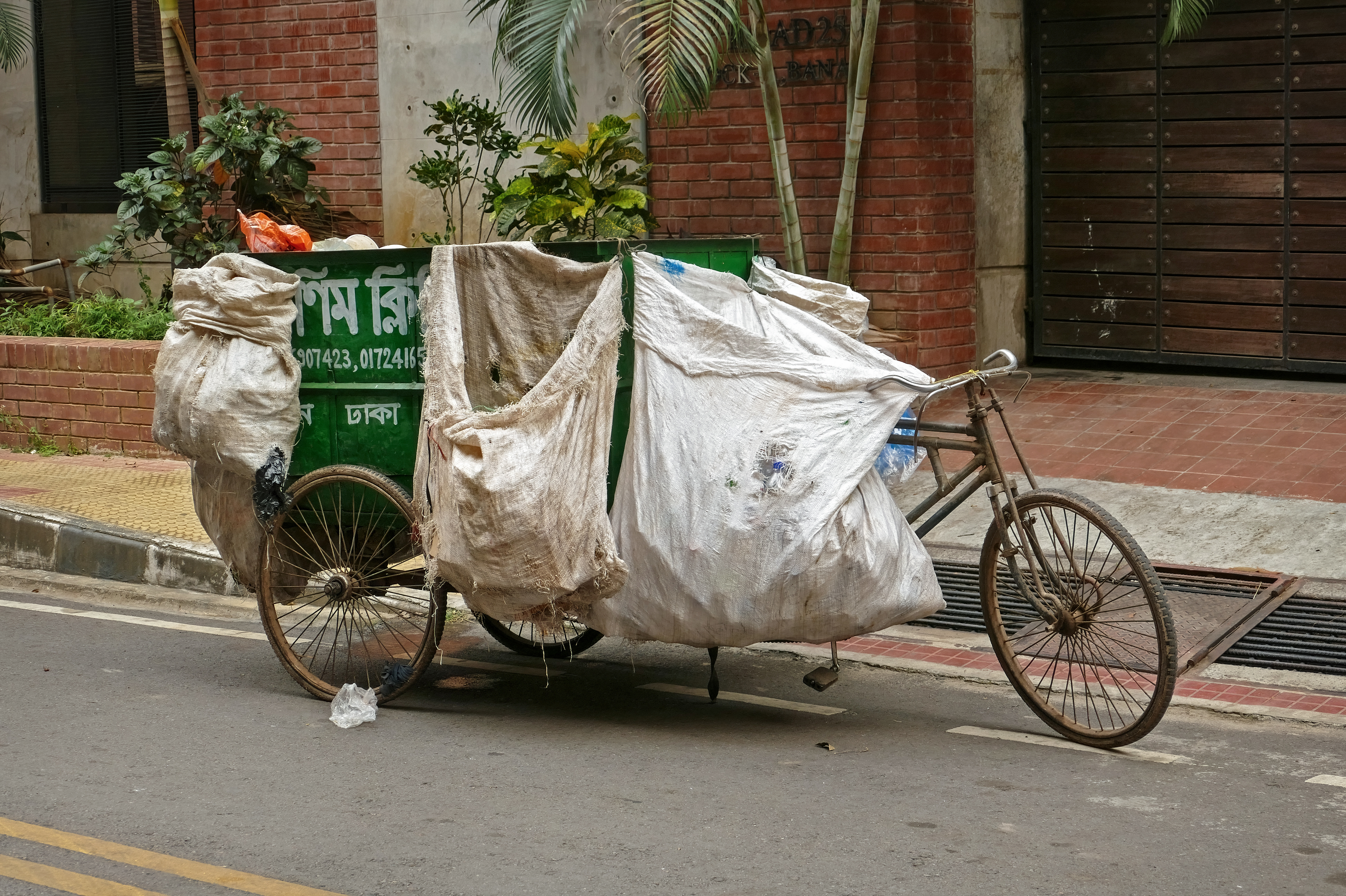
A private waste collection vehicle in Banani Model Town

Current (2012) waste generation in Bangladesh is around 22.4 million tonnes per year or 150 kg/cap/year. There is an increasing rate of waste generation in Bangladesh and it is projected to reach 47, 064 tonnes per day by 2025. The rate of waste generation is expected to increase to 220 kg/cap/year in 2025. A significant percentage of the population has zero access to proper waste disposal services, which will in effect lead to the problem of waste mismanagement.

The total waste collection rate in major cities of Bangladesh such as Dhaka is only 37%. When waste is not properly collected, it will be illegally disposed of and this will pose serious environmental and health hazards to the Bangladesh. To change this existing system, initiatives like BD Recycle Technologies Limited (BRTL), a Bangladesh-based recycling and waste management company established in 2018, operates digital platform that facilitates the collection, aggregation, and traceable recycling of solid waste from households, corporate offices, and manufacturing facilities. The company focuses primarily on plastic waste recycling while channeling other recyclable streams—such as paper, metal, and e-waste—to authorized third-party recyclers. BRTL also works to integrate informal waste workers into formal supply chains through digital onboarding, transparent pricing, and improved working conditions.[2] In recent years, the Government of Bangladesh has taken steps toward introducing Extended Producer Responsibility (EPR) as part of its national strategy for plastic waste management. Draft EPR guidelines issued by the Department of Environment (DoE) under the Ministry of Environment, Forest and Climate Change aim to make producers, brand owners, and importers responsible for the collection and environmentally sound recycling of post-consumer plastic waste. These forthcoming regulations are expected to require obligated entities to meet defined collection and recycling targets, submit annual compliance reports, and work through authorized Producer Responsibility Organizations (PROs). Within this evolving regulatory context, companies such as BRTL have positioned themselves to support EPR implementation by offering traceable collection systems, recycling verification, and digital reporting tools aligned with the draft directives. The introduction of EPR is expected to play a significant role in improving accountability, increasing recycling rates, and reducing plastic leakage into landfills and the environment.

== Negative impacts of poor waste management ==
One of the most adverse impacts of poor waste management, especially municipal waste, is the incidence and prevalence of diseases such as malaria and respiratory problems, as well as other illnesses through the contamination of ground water. Biomedical wastes pose great danger in Bangladesh too as a report estimated that 20% of the biomedical waste is "highly infectious" and is a hazard since it is often disposed of into the sewage system or drains. Such poor sanitation has serious consequences for the health of the residents and a report suggests that "most of the child mortality could be related with this problem". With regard to the living standards, solid waste leads to blockage in the drainage system which leads to flooding in the streets. Consequently, mosquitoes and bad odour are among the negative impacts resulted.

Landfills in most countries including in Bangladesh contribute to methane emissions which accelerates climate change. The Matuail Sanitary Landfill releases methane emissions equivalent to 190,000 cars.

== Current government efforts ==
There have been recent developments in Bangladesh to improve waste management, especially in urban cities. In Dhaka, Dhaka City Corporation with support from the Japan International Corporation Agency (JICA) has a master plan underway to better handle the solid waste management in Dhaka. For example, Social Business Enterprise Waste Concern, has sprung up to tackle the municipal waste accumulation problem through working with the households. UNICEF has also initiated recycling programs and waste control with the city corporations and municipalities. However, currently, there are still insufficient incentives to improve the standard of waste management across all relevant sectors, especially for industrial waste and medical waste.
