= List of books on Bangladesh Liberation War =

This is a non-fiction and fiction bibliography of the Bangladesh Liberation War.

== Non-fiction ==
This is a tabel of non-fiction of the Bangladesh Liberation War.

Author	Position of author	Book(s)	Ref.
Ziaur Rahman	Freedom Fighter (Bir Uttom), Member of Bangladesh Armed Force and Former President	Ekti Jatir Jonmo O Onnanno	
Ziaur Rahman	Freedom Fighter (Bir Uttom), Member of Bangladesh Armed Force and Former President	Amar Rajnitir Ruprekkha	
Khalilur Rahman	Freedom Fighter and Member of Bangladesh Armed Force	Purbapr 1971: Pakistan Sena Gonobor Theke Dekha	
Mohammad Shubid Ali Bhuiyan		Muktijuddhe Noy Mash	
Akhtaruddin Ahmed		Nationalism or Islam	
M.Hamidullah Khan		Ekatture Uttar Ronangon Vol.I & II	
M.Hamidullah Khan		Bangaleer Muktijuddher Potobhum	
Jahanara Imam		Ekatturer Dinguli	
Jahanara Imam		Buker Vitor Agun	
Jahanara Imam		Biday De Ma Ghure Ashi	
Jahanara Imam		Of Blood And Fire	
Abdul Gaffar Choudhury		Etihasher Rokto Polash	
Abdul Gaffar Choudhury		Amra Bangladeshi Na Bangali	
Abdul Gaffar Choudhury		Bangladesh Kotha Koy	
Rashid Haider		Ekattorer Osohojog Andolon Purbapor	
Rashid Haider		Ekusher Golpo	
Serajul Islam Choudhury		Bangali Kake Bole	
Ramendra Majumdar		Bangladesh Amar Bangladesh	
Sufia Kamal		Ekatturer Diary	
Asaduzzaman Asad (writer)		Shadhinota Sangramer Potobhumi	
Mahbub Alam		Guerrilla Theke Sommukh Juddhe Vol. 1 & 2	
Archer Blood		The cruel birth of Bangladesh: Memoirs of an American diplomat	
Gary J. Bass		The Blood Telegram: Nixon, Kissinger, and a Forgotten Genocide	
Sarmila Bose		Dead Reckoning: Memories of the 1971 Bangladesh War	
Bhattacharyya		Genocide in East Pakistan/Bangladesh: A Horror Story	
Susan Brownmiller		Against Our Will: Men, Women, and Rape	
R. J. Rummel		Death By Government	
Christopher Hitchens		The Trials of Henry Kissinger	
Scott Carney		The Vortex: A True Story of History's Deadliest Storm, an Unspeakable War, and Liberation	
Abdur Rouf Choudhury		Shayattyashason, Shadhikar O Shadhinota	
Abdur Rouf Choudhury		1971 Vol I & I	
Abdur Rouf Choudhury		Ekti Jatike Hotya	
Abdur Rouf Choudhury		Smrite Ekattur	
Abdur Rouf Choudhury		Natun Diganta Shamagra Vol.1, 2 & 3	
Selina Hosain		Hangor Nodi Grenade	
Selina Hosain		Ekatturer Dhaka	
Selina Hosain		Japitu Jibon	
Selina Hosain		Nirontor Ghontabidhan	
Panna Kaiser		Muktijuddher Aage O Pore	
Panna Kaiser		Hridoye Bangladesh	
Sezan Mahmud		Operation Jackpot	
Sezan Mahmud		Muktijudhdher Shera Lorai	
Zafar Iqbal		Muktijuddher Itihash	
Anisul Hoque		Ma	
Shahriyar Kabir		Ekatturer Pather Dhare	
Shahriyar Kabir		Ekatturer Jishu	
Humayun Ahmed		Joshna O Jononir Golpo	
Humayun Ahmed		1971	
Humayun Ahmed		Anil Bagchir Ekdin	
Humayun Ahmed		Aguner Parashmoni	
Humayun Ahmed		Shyamal Chhaya	
Muyeedul Hasan		Muldhara '71	
Muntasir Mamun		Sei Shob Pakistani	
A. K. Khandker		1971: Bhetore Baire	
Gaziul Haq		Ebarer Songram Shadhinotar Songram	
Ahmad Mazhar		Bangalir Muktijuddher Itihash	
Ahmed Maola		Muktijuddher Sahitto	
Nilima Ibrahim		Ami Birongona Bolchi	
Anisur Rahman		Opohrito Bangladesh	

== Juvenile novels ==
=== Selina Hossain ===
- Nitu, Pakhi O Muktijudhdho

=== Muhammed Zafar Iqbal ===
- Akash Bariye Dao
- Amar Bondhu Rashed
- Gramer Naam Kakondubi

=== Sezan Mahmud ===
- Moner Ghuri Latai
- Kala Kuthuri
- Muktijuddher Sera Lorai
- Operation Jackpot

== Short story collections ==
- Bangladesh Kotha Koy
- Prekhhapot 71
- Protibimbe Protiddondi
- Muktijuddher Golpo

== English books ==
- Ataul karim - Bangladesh Rokter Reen
- Mascarenhas, Anthony (1971). The Rape of Bangla Desh. Delhi: Vikas Publications. ISBN 0-7069-0148-7. Published before the end of the war, it contains little information on events after April 1971.
- Biplob roy - Bangladesh At War
- SIDDIQUE SALIK - Witness to Surrender
- Ahmad Sharif (Edited) - Genocide 71

== Uncategorized ==
=== Shawkat Osman ===
- Kalratro Khondochitro
- Joy Banglar Joy
- Jolangi
- Jahannam Hote Biday
- Jonmo Jodi Tobo Bonge
- Dui Soinik
- Nekre Oronno
- Shiekher Sombora

=== M. R. Akhtar Mukul ===
- Ekatturer Bornomala
- Ora Charjon
- Joybangla
- Bijoy
- Ekattur
- Ami Bijoy Dekhechi

=== Abul Hasanat ===
- Muktijuddher Ruprekha
- Muktijuddher Pachali

=== Rabeya Khatun ===
- Ferari Surjo
- Ekatturer Nishan

=== Momtaj Uddin Ahmad ===
- Saat Ghater Kanakori
- Bokul Purer Shadhinota

=== Other authors ===
- Syed Shamsul Haque - Nishiddho Loban
- Begum Nurjahan - Ekatturer Kothamala
- Abdullah Al Mamun - Tomrai
- Ashraf Siddiqi - Banglar Mukh
- Musa Sadiq - Muktijuddho Hridoye Momo
- Sayed Ali Ahsan - Jokhon Somoy Elo
- Rabindra Gop - Juddho Joyer Golpo
- Shirin Majid - Abar Asibo Feere
- Ali Imam - Lorai
- Biprodash Barua - Juddho Joyer Golpo
- Monju Sarkar - Juddhe Jabar Somoy
- Daud Hayder - Rajputra
- Monayem Sarkar - Bangladesh O Bongobondhu
- Jubayda Gulshan Ara - Batashe Barud Rokte Ullash
- Abu Hanif - Muktijoddha Hatem Ali
- Abul Kalam Azad - Sangramee Bangla
- Manjur Ahmad - Ekattur Kotha Bole
- Mamunur Rashid - Joy Joyonti
- Alo Adharer Akattor - Serazul Quader published by Ghasphul
