= Abortion in Bangladesh =

Abortion is illegal in Bangladesh under most situations, but menstrual regulation is often used as a substitute. Bangladesh is still governed by the Penal Code of 1860, where induced abortion is illegal unless the woman is in danger.

Historically, abortion has been prevalent, especially during the years following the Bangladesh Liberation War. For example, in 1972, the law allowed for abortion for those women who has been raped during the war. In 1976, the Bangladesh National Population Policy unsuccessfully attempted to legalize abortion in the first trimester.

Since 1979, menstrual regulation has been the favored alternative to induced abortion, and it is legally permitted because pregnancy cannot be established. In 2012, the Drug Administration for Bangladesh legalised the combination of mifepristone and misoprostol for medical abortion.

== Menstrual regulation ==
Part of the family planning program in Bangladesh since 1979, menstrual regulation is a procedure that uses manual vacuum aspiration to make it impossible to be pregnant after missing a period. It is simple and can be done with inexpensive equipment. The procedure also is performed without the use of anaesthesia.

A study about menstrual regulation in 2013 studied 651 consenting women from 10 different facilities in Bangladesh, who were seeking menstrual regulation and were about 63 days or less late of their menstrual cycle. They were given about 200 mg of mifepristone, followed later by 800 mg of misoprostol. The researchers found that 93% of the women had evacuated the uterus without the use of the surgical intervention, and 92% of the women were satisfied with the pills and the rest of the treatment.

Although menstrual regulation centers are centralized and free of charge, many women still lack access due to socioeconomic barriers and social stigma. Centers charge additional fees if the pregnancy is beyond 10 weeks, and many women are unaware of menstrual regulation or face male opposition to the procedure. As a result, some women turn to illegal abortions.

== Abortion ==
An abortion can be legally performed by a physician in a hospital, if it is necessary to save the life of the mother. A person who performs an abortion under any other circumstances, including a woman who self-aborts, can be punished by a fine and imprisonment.

Menstrual regulation allows a woman to terminate within 10 weeks of her last period, but unsafe methods to terminate pregnancy are widespread. In response, a hotline was created for women to get information about fertility control, including menstrual regulation.

According to an article by the Guttmacher Institute, which studied the rural sub-district of Matlab, illegal abortion is becoming increasingly prevalent despite the availability of safer methods of fertility control.

A study by Mizanur Rahman and Julie DaVanzo showed that between 2000 and 2008, a woman was more likely to die from the complications of unsafe abortion than from childbirth itself, and that death rates from childbirth were similar of the death rates for the complications of menstrual regulation.

Another study in Matlab found that between 1982 and 1998, abortion about 35 times more prevalent among unmarried adolescent girls than among married adolescent girls, and it was much higher among who were less than 18 years of age and those who passed or had more than primary education.

== Statistics ==
As of 2014, the national rate that women participate in menstrual regulation as a post-contraceptive way to control their fertility was 10 per 1,000 women aged 15–49. The national rate for induced abortion was 29 per 1,000 women in the same age interval. The United Nations estimated that in 2000, the abortion rate was 4.0 abortions per 1,000 women aged 15–44.

Only 42% of facilities that were expected to provide menstrual regulation services actually did so. Of the Union Health and Family Welfare Centres, which are especially relied upon in rural areas, half provided these services. According to Guttmacher, about 27% of women (about 105,000) are turned away annually. In addition, in 2014, about 50% of married Bangladeshi women had not heard of menstrual regulation.

In 2014, it was estimated that between 523,808 and 769,269 abortions occurred per year in Bangladesh.
