= Wildlife of Bhutan =

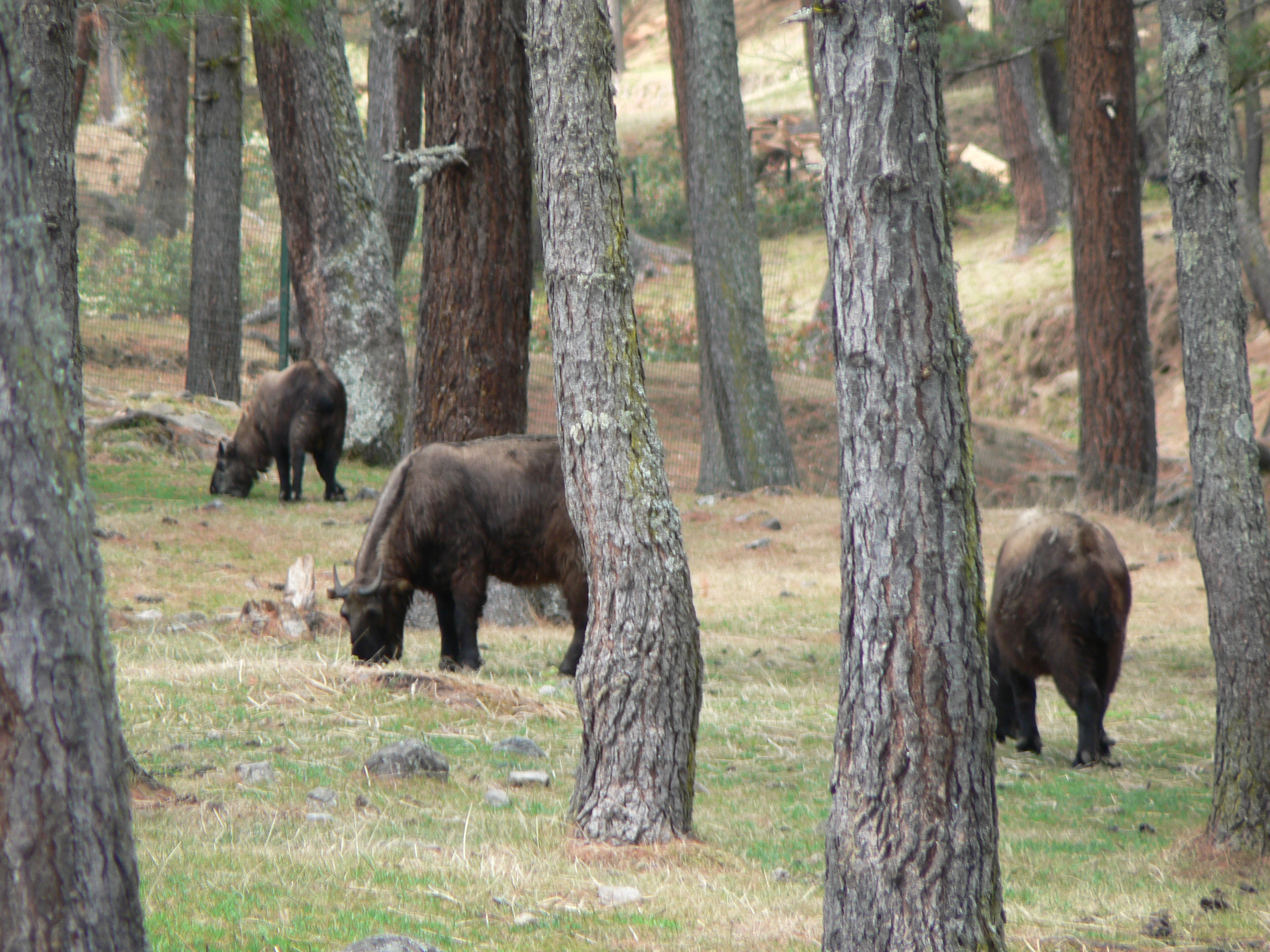
The takin is Bhutan's national animal.

The Kingdom of Bhutan is a small, landlocked nation nestled in the southern slopes of the Eastern Himalaya. To its north lies the Tibet Autonomous Region of China and to the west, south and east lies the Indian states of Sikkim, Bengal, Assam and Arunachal Pradesh.

The terrain is some of the most rugged in the world, characterised by huge variations in altitude. Within the 150 miles between the southern and northern borders, Bhutan's elevation rises from 150 to more than 7,500 metres. This great geographical diversity combined with equally diverse climate conditions contributes to Bhutan's outstanding range of biodiversity and ecosystems.

The tiger, one-horned rhino, golden langur, clouded leopard, hispid hare and the sloth bear live in the lush tropical lowland and hardwood forests in the south. In the temperate zone, grey langur, tiger, leopard, goral and serow are found in mixed conifer, broadleaf and pine forests. Fruit bearing trees and bamboo provide habitat for the Himalayan black bear, red panda, squirrel, sambar, wild pig and barking deer. The alpine habitats of the great Himalayan range in the north are home to the snow leopard, blue sheep, marmot, antelope and Himalayan musk deer.

As of 2017 there are 4567 known species of flower plants and another 709 species of ferns and mosses. Regarding vertebrates, there are 736 species of birds, 129 species of mammals and 158 species of amphibians and reptiles.

In Bhutan forest cover is around 71% of the total land area, equivalent to 2,725,080 hectares (ha) of forest in 2020, up from 2,506,720 hectares (ha) in 1990. In 2020, naturally regenerating forest covered 2,704,260 hectares (ha) and planted forest covered 20,820 hectares (ha). Of the naturally regenerating forest 15% was reported to be primary forest (consisting of native tree species with no clearly visible indications of human activity) and around 41% of the forest area was found within protected areas. For the year 2015, 100% of the forest area was reported to be under public ownership.

== Conservation significance ==
The Eastern Himalayas have been identified as a global biodiversity hotspot and counted among the 234 globally outstanding ecoregions of the world in a comprehensive analysis of global biodiversity undertaken by WWF between 2009-2021.

Bhutan is seen as a model for proactive conservation initiatives. The Kingdom has received international acclaim for its commitment to the maintenance of its biodiversity. This is reflected in the decision to maintain at least 12 percent of the land area under forest cover, to designate more than a quarter of its territory as national parks, reserves and other protected areas, and most recently to identify a further nine percent of land area as biodiversity corridors linking the protected areas.

Environmental conservation has been placed at the core of the nation's development strategy, the middle path. It is not treated as a sector but rather as a set of concerns that must be mainstreamed in Bhutan's overall approach to development planning and to be buttressed by the force of law.

== Conservation issues ==
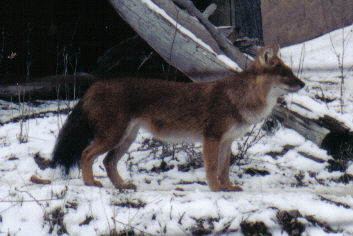
The most endangered Asia top predator of 2010, the dhole is on edge of extinction. There remain less than 2500 members of this species in the world.

Although Bhutan's natural heritage is still largely intact, the Government has rightly recognised that it cannot be taken for granted and that conservation of the natural environment must be considered one of the challenges that will need to be addressed in the years ahead.

Pressures on the natural environment are already evident and will be fuelled by a complex array of forces. They include population pressures, agricultural modernisation, poaching, large-scale hydro-power development, mineral extraction, industrialisation, urbanisation, sewage and waste disposal, tourism, competition for available land road construction and the provision of other physical infrastructure associated with social and economic development.

Policy implementation needs to be continually improved. Sustainable rural livelihoods that do not rely solely upon natural resource use need to be developed and supported, and there needs to be far wider understanding of the environmental threats that come hand in hand with development, to ensure the future of Bhutan's rich and diverse environment.

== Fauna ==
Mammals:

- Argali
- Asian elephant
- Asiatic black bear
- Golden langur
- Binturong
- Tiger
- Dhole
- Snow leopard
- Bhutan takin
- Gray wolf

Birds:

- Black-necked cranes in Bhutan

== See also ==
- Protected areas of Bhutan
- Wildlife of India
- Wildlife of Pakistan
- Wildlife of Bangladesh
- Wildlife of Sri Lanka
- Wildlife of Myanmar (formerly Burma)
