= List of mammals of Bangladesh =

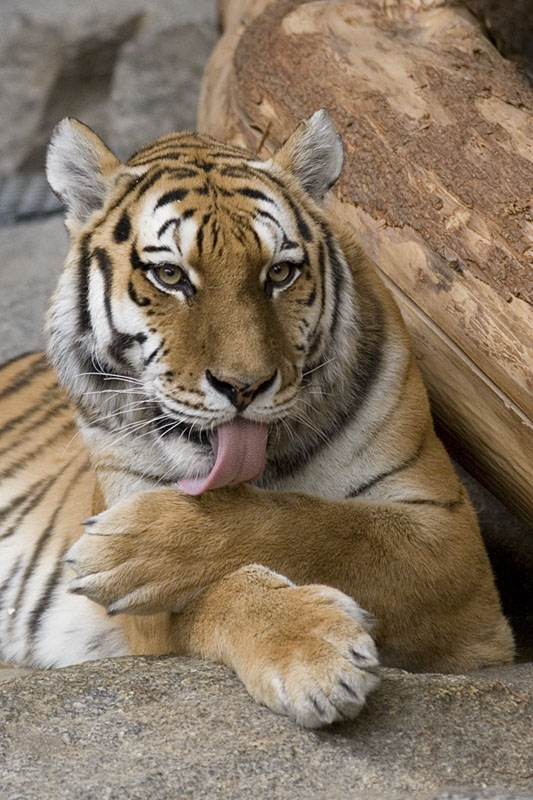
The Bengal tiger, Panthera tigris tigris, is the national animal of Bangladesh

This is a list of the mammal species recorded in Bangladesh. There are one hundred and twenty-eight mammal species in Bangladesh, of which two are critically endangered, seventeen are endangered, eighteen are vulnerable, and six are near threatened.

The following tags are used to highlight each species' conservation status as assessed by the International Union for Conservation of Nature:

EX	Extinct	No reasonable doubt that the last individual has died.
EW	Extinct in the wild	Known only to survive in captivity or as a naturalized population well outside its previous range.
CR	Critically endangered	The species is in imminent risk of extinction in the wild.
EN	Endangered	The species is facing an extremely high risk of extinction in the wild.
VU	Vulnerable	The species is facing a high risk of extinction in the wild.
NT	Near threatened	The species does not meet any of the criteria that would categorise it as risking extinction but it is likely to do so in the future.
LC	Least concern	There are no current identifiable risks to the species.
DD	Data deficient	There is inadequate information to make an assessment of the risks to this species.

== Order: Artiodactyla (even-toed ungulates) ==
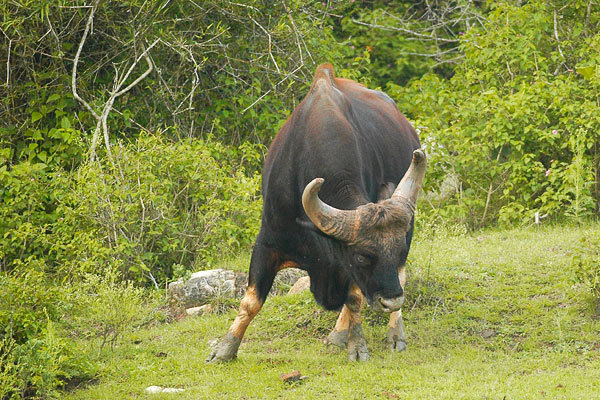
Gaur

The even-toed ungulates are ungulates whose weight is borne about equally by the third and fourth toes, rather than mostly or entirely by the third as in perissodactyls. There are about 220 artiodactyl species, including many that are of great economic importance to humans.

- Family: Bovidae (cattle, antelope, sheep, goats)
  - Subfamily: Bovinae
    - Genus: Bos
      - Gaur, B. gaurus VU
  - Subfamily: Caprinae
    - Genus: Capricornis
      - Mainland serow, C. sumatraensis VU
- Family: Cervidae (deer)
  - Subfamily: Cervinae
    - Genus: Axis
      - Chital, A. axis LC
      - Indian hog deer, A. porcinus EN
    - Genus: Rusa
      - Sambar deer, R. unicolor VU
  - Subfamily: Muntiacinae
    - Genus: Muntiacus
      - Indian muntjac, M. muntjak LC
- Family: Suidae (pigs)
  - Subfamily: Suinae
    - Genus: Sus
      - Wild boar, S. scrofa LC

== Order: Carnivora (carnivorans) ==
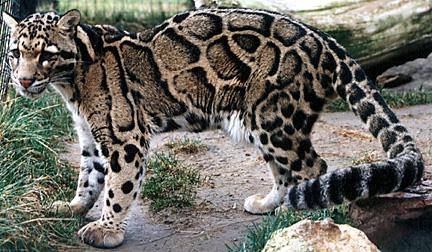
Clouded leopard

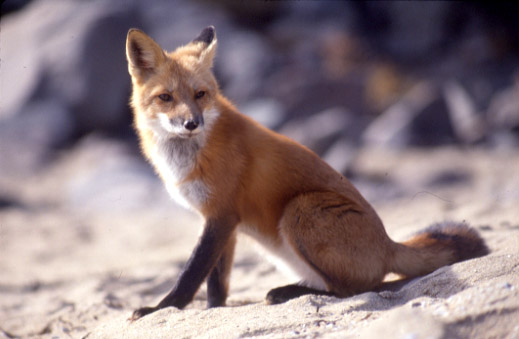
Red fox

There are over 260 species of carnivorans, the majority of which eat meat as their primary dietary item. They have a characteristic skull shape and dentition.

- Suborder: Feliformia
  - Family: Felidae (cats)
    - Subfamily: Felinae
      - Genus: Catopuma
        - Asian golden cat, C. temminckii NT
      - Genus: Felis
        - Jungle cat, F. chaus LC
      - Genus: Pardofelis
        - Marbled cat, P. marmorata NT
      - Genus: Prionailurus
        - Leopard cat, P. bengalensis LC
        - Fishing cat, P. viverrinus VU
    - Subfamily: Pantherinae
      - Genus: Neofelis
        - Clouded leopard, N. nebulosa VU
      - Genus: Panthera
        - Leopard, P. pardus VU
          - Indian leopard, P. p. fusca
        - Tiger, P. tigris EN
          - Bengal tiger, P. t. tigris
  - Family: Viverridae
    - Subfamily: Paradoxurinae
      - Genus: Arctictis
        - Binturong, A. binturong VU
      - Genus: Arctogalidia
        - Small-toothed palm civet, A. trivirgata LC
      - Genus: Paguma
        - Masked palm civet, P. larvata LC
      - Genus: Paradoxurus
        - Asian palm civet, P. hermaphroditus LC
    - Subfamily: Viverrinae
      - Genus: Viverra
        - Large Indian civet, V. zibetha LC
      - Genus: Viverricula
        - Small Indian civet, V. indica LC
  - Family: Herpestidae (mongooses)
    - Genus: Urva
      - Small Indian mongoose, U. auropunctata LC
      - Indian grey mongoose, U. edwardsii LC
      - Crab-eating mongoose, U. urva LC
- Suborder: Caniformia
  - Family: Canidae (dogs, foxes)
    - Genus: Canis
      - Golden jackal, C. aureus LC
    - Genus: Cuon
      - Dhole, C. alpinus EN
    - Genus: Vulpes
      - Bengal fox, V. bengalensis LC
      - Red fox, V. vulpes LC
  - Family: Ursidae (bears)
    - Genus: Helarctos
      - Sun bear, H. malayanus VU
    - Genus: Ursus
      - Asiatic black bear, U. thibetanus VU
  - Family: Mustelidae (weasels)
    - Genus: Aonyx
      - Asian small-clawed otter, A. cinereus VU
    - Genus: Arctonyx
      - Northern hog badger, A. albogularis LC
      - Greater hog badger, A. collaris VU
    - Genus: Lutra
      - Eurasian otter, L. lutra NT
    - Genus: Lutrogale
      - Smooth-coated otter, L. perspicillata VU
    - Genus: Martes
      - Yellow-throated marten, M. flavigula LC
    - Genus: Melogale
      - Burmese ferret badger, M. personata LC

== Order: Cetacea (whales) ==
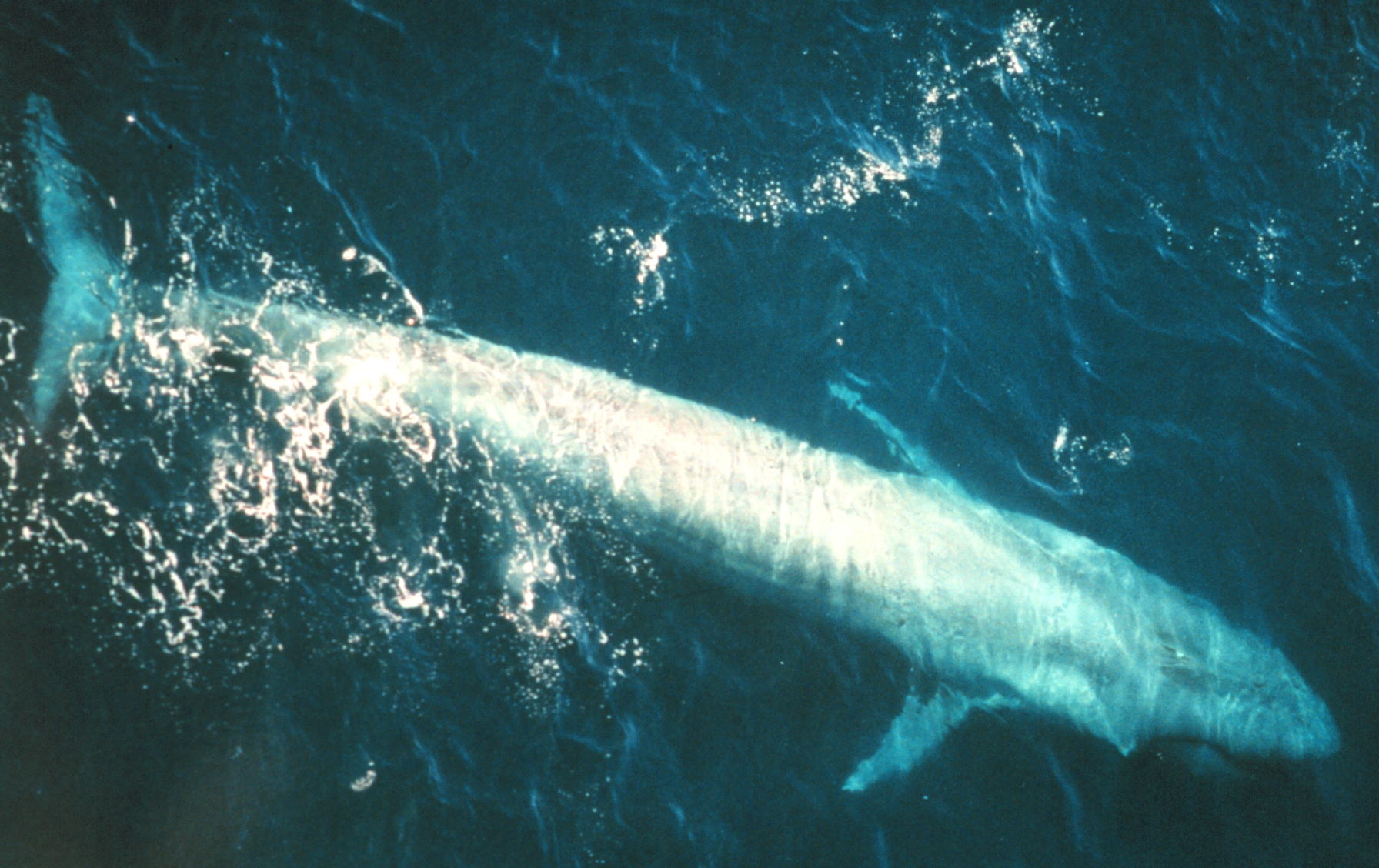
Blue whale

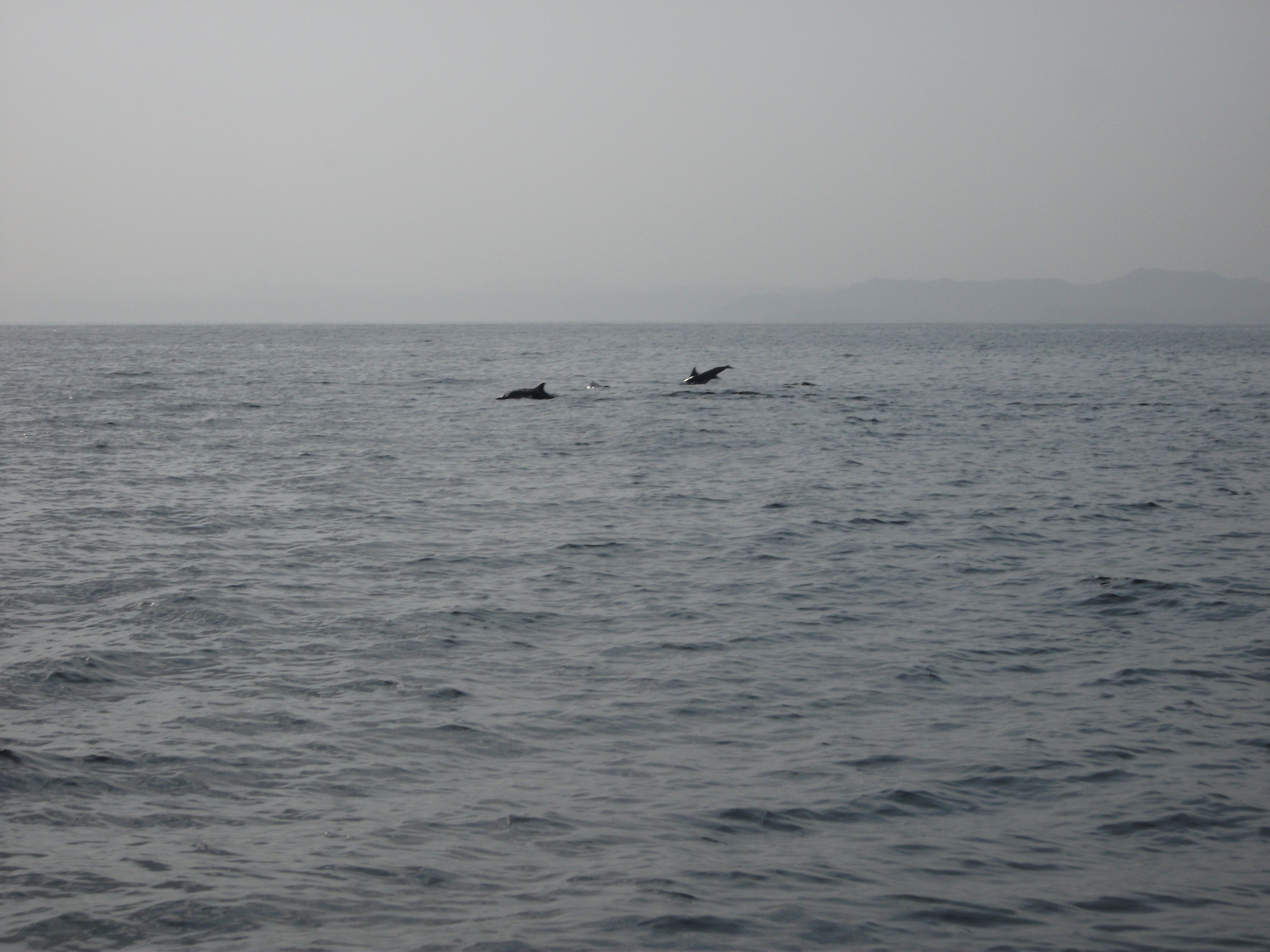
Dolphins in Al Bandar bay

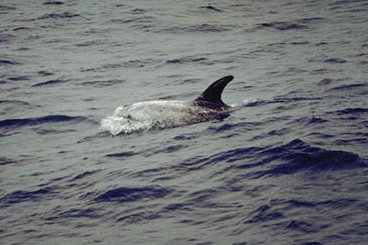
Risso's dolphin

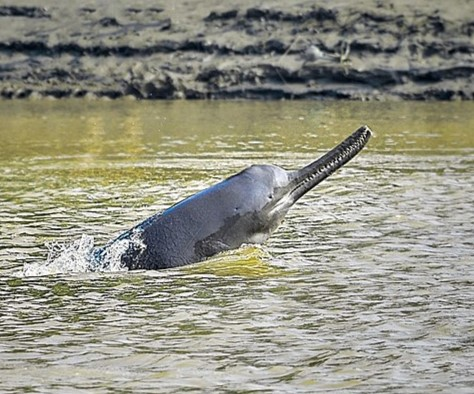
Ganges river dolphin

The order Cetacea includes whales, dolphins and porpoises. They are the mammals most fully adapted to aquatic life with a spindle-shaped nearly hairless body, protected by a thick layer of blubber, and forelimbs and tail modified to provide propulsion underwater.

- Suborder: Mysticeti
  - Family: Balaenopteridae
    - Subfamily: Balaenopterinae
      - Genus: Balaenoptera
        - Common minke whale, B. acutorostrata LC
        - Bryde's whale, B. brydei DD
        - Eden's whale, B. edeni DD
        - Blue whale, B. musculus EN
        - Fin whale, B. physalus EN
    - Subfamily: Megapterinae
      - Genus: Megaptera
        - Humpback whale, M. novaeangliae VU
- Suborder: Odontoceti
  - Family: Physeteridae
    - Genus: Physeter
      - Sperm whale, P. macrocephalus VU
  - Superfamily: Platanistoidea
    - Family: Platanistidae
      - Genus: Platanista
        - Ganges river dolphin, P. gangetica EN
    - Family: Phocoenidae
      - Genus: Neophocaena
        - Finless porpoise, N. phocaenoides DD
    - Family: Delphinidae (marine dolphins)
      - Genus: Feresa
        - Pygmy killer whale, F. attenuata DD
      - Genus: Globicephala
        - Pilot whale, G. macrorhynchus LC
      - Genus: Grampus
        - Risso's dolphin, G. griseus DD
      - Genus: Lagenodelphis
        - Fraser's dolphin, L. hosei DD
      - Genus: Orcaella
        - Irrawaddy dolphin, O. brevirostris EN
      - Genus: Peponocephala
        - Melon-headed whale, P. electra LC
      - Genus: Pseudorca
        - False killer whale, P. crassidens DD
      - Genus: Stenella
        - Pantropical spotted dolphin, S. attenuata LC
        - Spinner dolphin, S. longirostris LC
      - Genus: Steno
        - Rough-toothed dolphin, S. bredanensis DD
      - Genus: Sousa
        - Indo-Pacific humpbacked dolphin, S. chinensis DD
      - Genus: Tursiops
        - Indo-Pacific bottlenose dolphin, T. aduncus DD
        - Bottlenose dolphin, T. truncatus DD

== Order: Chiroptera (bats) ==
The bats' most distinguishing feature is that their forelimbs are developed as wings, making them the only mammals capable of flight. Bat species account for about 20% of all mammals.

- Family: Pteropodidae (flying foxes, Old World fruit bats)
  - Subfamily: Pteropodinae
    - Genus: Cynopterus
      - Greater short-nosed fruit bat, C. sphinx LC
    - Genus: Pteropus
      - Indian flying fox, P. giganteus LC
    - Genus: Rousettus
      - Leschenault's rousette, R. leschenaultii NT
- Family: Vespertilionidae
  - Subfamily: Myotinae
    - Genus: Myotis
      - Hairy-faced bat, M. annectans LC
      - Lesser mouse-eared bat, M. blythii LC
      - Whiskered myotis, M. muricola LC
      - Himalayan whiskered bat, M. siligorensis LC
  - Subfamily: Vespertilioninae
    - Genus: Pipistrellus
      - Indian pipistrelle, P. coromandra LC
    - Genus: Scotoecus
      - Desert yellow bat, Scotoecus pallidus NT
    - Genus: Scotophilus
      - Lesser Asiatic yellow bat, Scotophilus kuhlii LC
    - Genus: Scotozous
      - Dormer's pipistrelle, Scotozous dormeri LC
    - Genus: Tylonycteris
      - Lesser bamboo bat, Tylonycteris pachypus LC
  - Subfamily: Miniopterinae
    - Genus: Miniopterus
      - Small bent-winged bat, Miniopterus pusillus LC
- Family: Rhinopomatidae
  - Genus: Rhinopoma
    - Lesser mouse-tailed bat, Rhinopoma hardwickei LC
    - Greater mouse-tailed bat, Rhinopoma microphyllum LC
- Family: Molossidae
  - Genus: Chaerephon
    - Wrinkle-lipped free-tailed bat, Chaerephon plicata LC
- Family: Emballonuridae
  - Genus: Saccolaimus
    - Naked-rumped pouched bat, Saccolaimus saccolaimus LC
  - Genus: Taphozous
    - Long-winged tomb bat, Taphozous longimanus LC
- Family: Rhinolophidae
  - Subfamily: Rhinolophinae
    - Genus: Rhinolophus
      - Intermediate horseshoe bat, Rhinolophus affinis LC
  - Subfamily: Hipposiderinae
    - Genus: Coelops
      - Tail-less leaf-nosed bat, Coelops frithii LC
    - Genus: Hipposideros
      - Dusky roundleaf bat, Hipposideros ater LC
      - Indian roundleaf bat, Hipposideros lankadiva LC
      - Intermediate roundleaf bat, Hipposideros larvatus LC
      - Great roundleaf bat, Hipposideros armiger LC
- Family: Megadermatidae
  - Genus: Lyroderma
      - Greater false vampire bat, Lyroderma lyra LC

== Order: Eulipotyphla (shrews and hedgehogs) ==
The name of these mammals refers to their absence of blind gut, though at times it can translate to true insectivores.

- Family: Talpidae
    - Genus: Euroscaptor
      - Himalayan mole, Euroscaptor micrurus LC

== Order: Lagomorpha (lagomorphs) ==
The lagomorphs comprise two families, Leporidae (hares and rabbits), and Ochotonidae (pikas). Though they can resemble rodents, and were classified as a superfamily in that order until the early 20th century, they have since been considered a separate order. They differ from rodents in a number of physical characteristics, such as having four incisors in the upper jaw rather than two.

- Family: Leporidae (rabbits, hares)
  - Genus: Caprolagus
    - Hispid hare, C. hispidus EN presence uncertain
  - Genus: Lepus
    - Indian hare, L. nigricollis LC

== Order: Pholidota (pangolins) ==
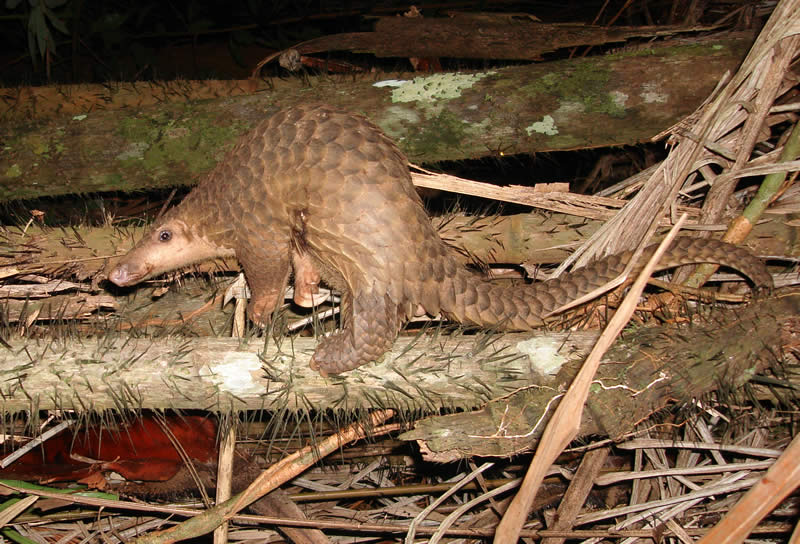
Sunda pangolin

The order Pholidota comprises the eight species of pangolin. Pangolins are anteaters and have the powerful claws, elongated snout and long tongue seen in the other unrelated anteater species.

- Family: Manidae
  - Genus: Manis
    - Indian pangolin, M. crassicaudata EN
    - Sunda pangolin, M. javanica CR
    - Chinese pangolin, M. pentadactyla CR

== Order: Primates ==
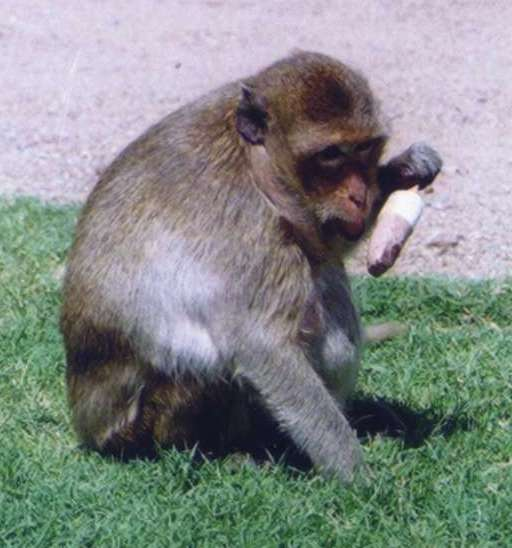
Crab-eating macaque

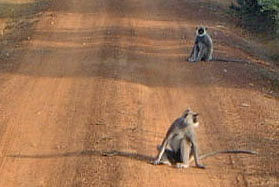
Gray langur

The order Primates contains humans and their closest relatives: lemurs, lorisoids, monkeys, and apes.

- Suborder: Strepsirrhini
  - Infraorder: Lemuriformes
    - Superfamily: Lorisoidea
      - Family: Lorisidae (lorises, bushbabies)
        - Genus: Nycticebus
          - Bengal slow loris, N. bengalensis EN
          - Sunda slow loris, N. coucang EN
- Suborder: Haplorhini
  - Infraorder: Simiiformes
    - Parvorder: Catarrhini
      - Superfamily: Cercopithecoidea
        - Family: Cercopithecidae (Old World monkeys)
          - Genus: Macaca
            - Stump-tailed macaque, M. arctoides VU}
            - Assam macaque, M. assamensis NT
            - Crab-eating macaque, M. fascicularis VU
            - Northern pigtail macaque, M. leonina VU
            - Rhesus macaque, M. mulatta LC
          - Subfamily: Colobinae
            - Genus: Semnopithecus
              - Northern plains gray langur, S. entellus LC
            - Genus: Trachypithecus
              - Dusky leaf monkey, T. obscurus EN
              - Phayre's leaf monkey, T. phayrei EN
              - Bonneted langur, T. pileatus EN
      - Superfamily: Hominoidea
        - Family: Hylobatidae (gibbons)
          - Genus: Hoolock
            - Western hoolock gibbon, H. hoolock EN

== Order: Proboscidea (elephants) ==
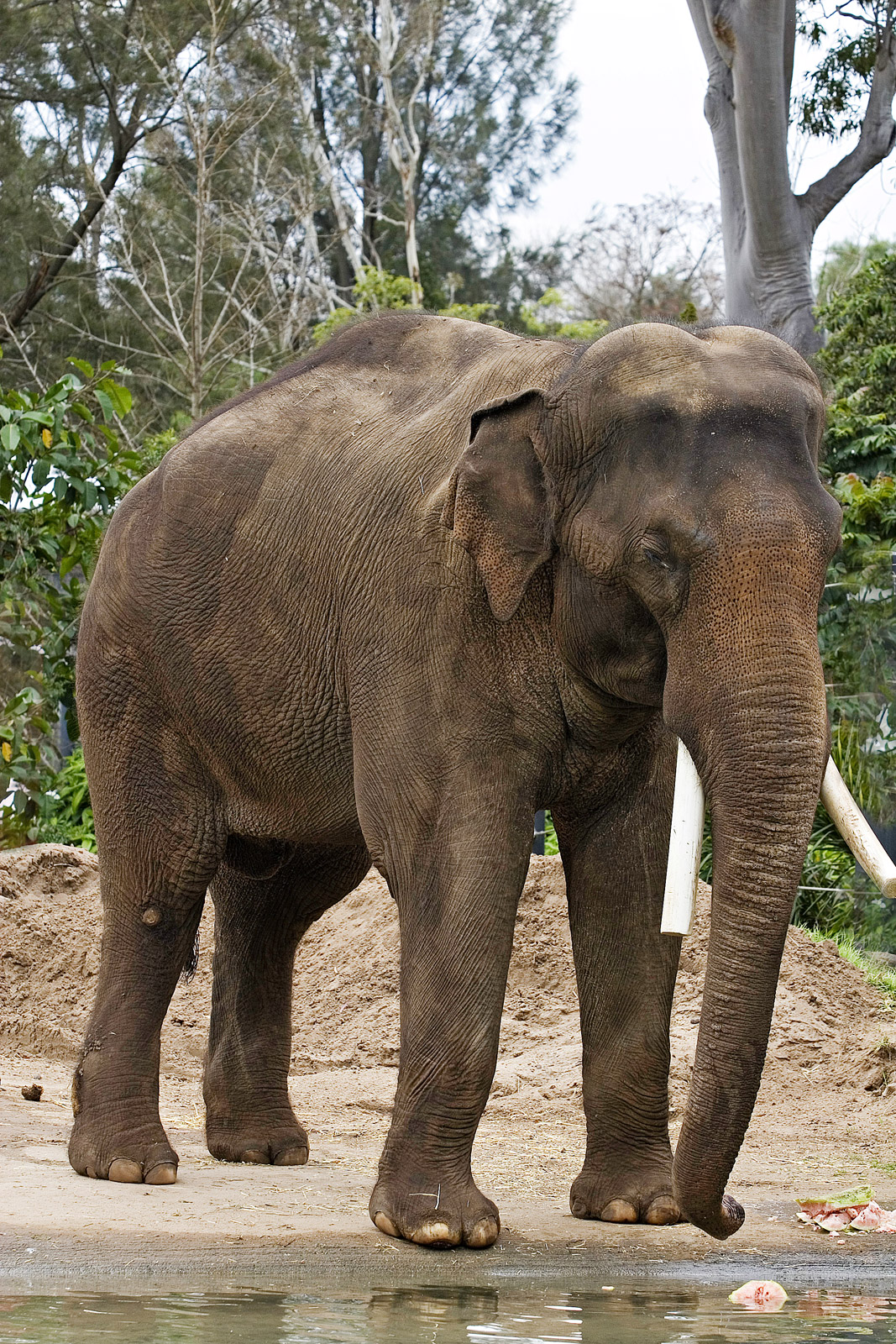
Asian elephant

The elephants comprise three living species, and are the largest living land animals.

- Family: Elephantidae (elephants)
  - Genus: Elephas
    - Asian elephant, E. maximus EN

== Order: Rodentia (rodents) ==
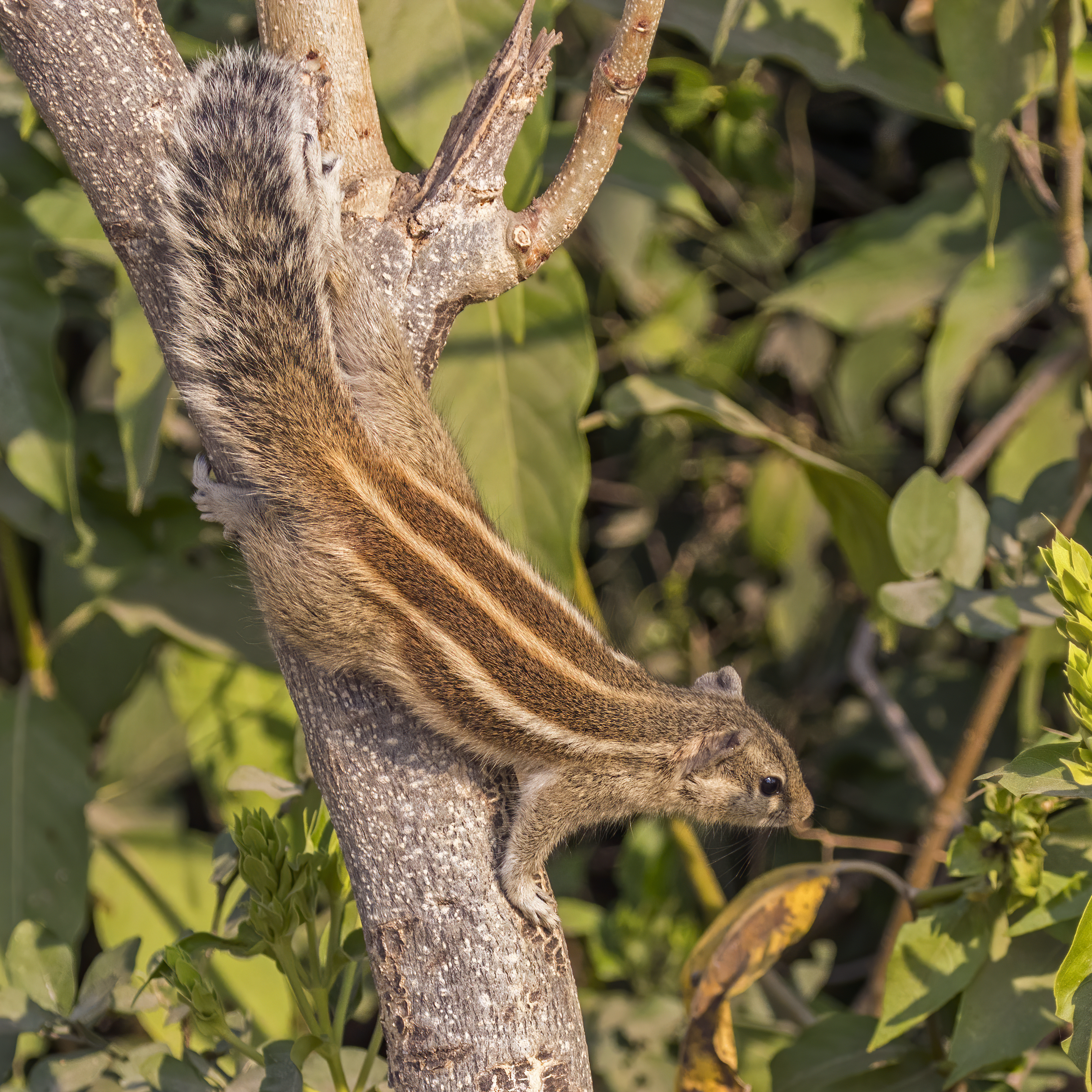
Northern palm squirrel

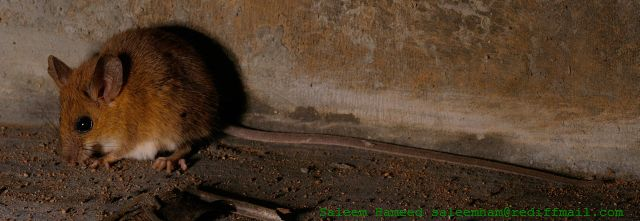
Asiatic long-tailed climbing mouse

Rodents make up the largest order of mammals, with over 40% of mammalian species. They have two incisors in the upper and lower jaw which grow continually and must be kept short by gnawing. Most rodents are small though the capybara can weigh up to 45 kg (100 lb).

- Family: Hystricidae (Old World porcupines)
  - Genus: Atherurus
    - Asiatic brush-tailed porcupine, A. macrourus LC
  - Genus: Hystrix
    - Malayan porcupine, H. brachyura LC
- Suborder: Sciurognathi
  - Family: Sciuridae (squirrels)
    - Subfamily: Ratufinae
      - Genus: Ratufa
        - Black giant squirrel, R. bicolor LC
    - Subfamily: Callosciurinae
      - Genus: Funambulus
        - Northern palm squirrel, F. pennantii LC
        - Indian palm squirrel, F. palmarum LC
    - Subfamily: Sciurinae
      - Tribe: Pteromyini
        - Genus: Hylopetes
          - Particolored flying squirrel, H. alboniger EN
        - Genus: Petaurista
          - Bhutan giant flying squirrel, P. nobilis LC
      - Genus: Dremomys
        - Orange-bellied Himalayan squirrel, D. lokriah LC
    - Subfamily: Callosciurinae
      - Genus: Callosciurus
        - Irrawaddy squirrel, C. pygerythrus LC
        - Pallas's squirrel, C. erythraeus LC
  - Family: Spalacidae
    - Subfamily: Rhizomyinae
      - Genus: Cannomys
        - Lesser bamboo rat, C. badius LC
  - Family: Muridae (mice, rats, voles, gerbils, hamsters, etc.)
    - Subfamily: Murinae
      - Genus: Bandicota
        - Lesser bandicoot rat, B. bengalensis LC
        - Greater bandicoot rat, B. indica LC
      - Genus: Leopoldamys
        - Long-tailed giant rat, L. sabanus LC
      - Genus: Rattus
        - Brown rat, R. norvegicus LC
        - Black rat, R. rattusLC
      - Genus: Millardia
        - Soft-furred rat, M. meltada LC
      - Genus: Nesokia
        - Short-tailed bandicoot rat, N. indica LC
      - Genus: Niviventer
        - Chestnut white-bellied rat, N. fulvescens LC
      - Genus: Rattus
        - Polynesian rat, R. exulans LC
        - Himalayan field rat, R. nitidus LC
        - Tanezumi rat, R. tanezumi LC
      - Genus: Vandeleuria
        - Asiatic long-tailed climbing mouse, V. oleracea LC

== Order: Sirenia (manatees and dugongs) ==
Sirenia is an order of fully aquatic, herbivorous mammals that inhabit rivers, estuaries, coastal marine waters, swamps, and marine wetlands. All four species are endangered.

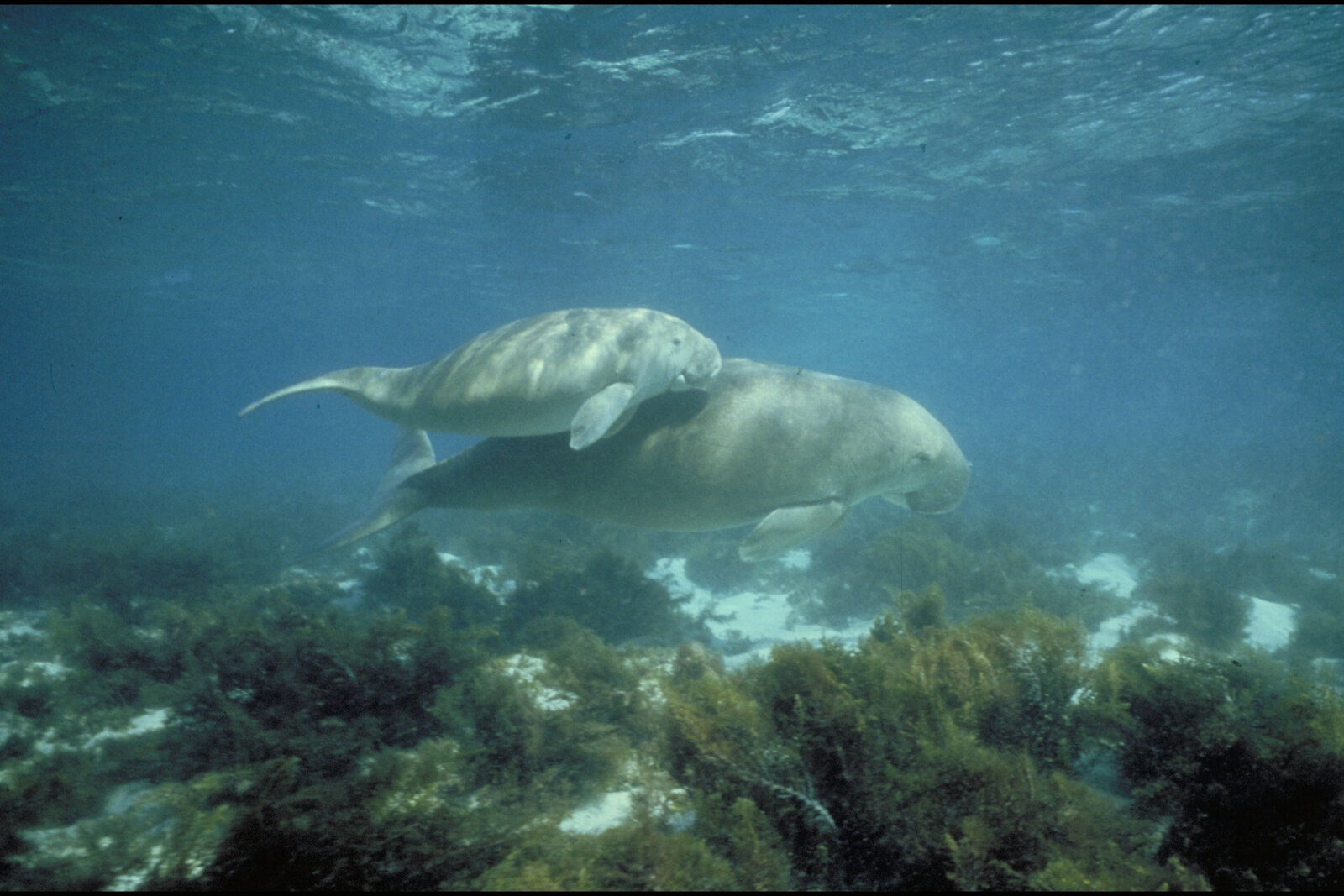
Dugong

- Family: Dugongidae
  - Genus: Dugong
    - Dugong, D. dugon VU

== Order: Soricomorpha (shrews) ==
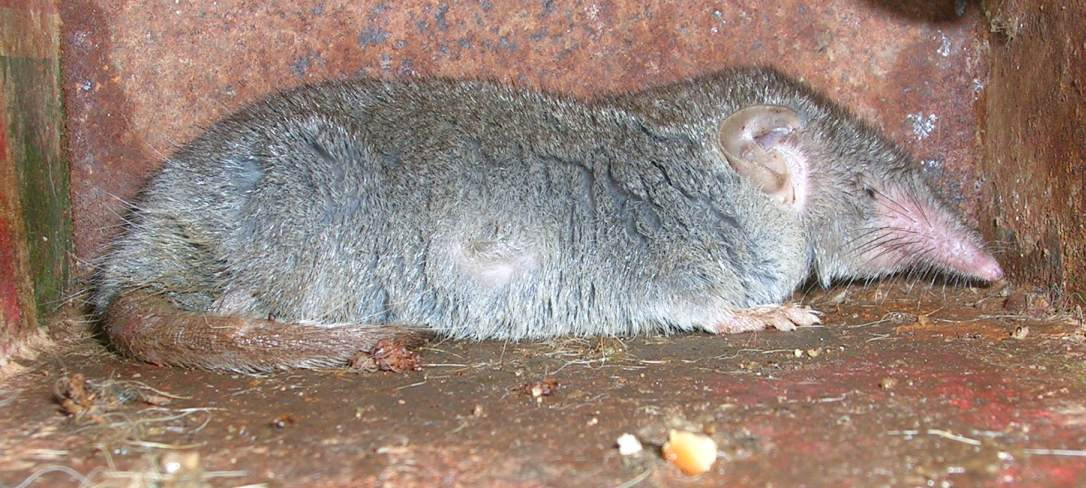
Asian house shrew

The "shrew-forms" are insectivorous mammals. The shrews and solenodons closely resemble mice while the moles are stout-bodied burrowers.

- Family: Soricidae (shrews)
  - Subfamily: Crocidurinae
    - Genus: Crocidura
      - Southeast Asian shrew, C. fuliginosa LC
    - Genus: Suncus
      - Asian house shrew, S. murinus LC
      - Anderson's shrew, S. stoliczkanus LC

== Locally extinct ==
The following species are locally extinct in the country:

- Blackbuck, Antilope cervicapra since the end of the 19th century
- Banteng, Bos javanicus since the 1940s
- Nilgai, Boselaphus tragocamelus since the 1930s
- Wild water buffalo, Bubalus arnee since the 1940s
- Gray wolf, Canis lupus since the mid 20th century
- Sumatran rhinoceros, Dicerorhinus sumatrensis since the 1930s
- Sloth bear, Melursus ursinus since the early 21st century
- Pygmy hog, Porcula salvanius
- Javan rhinoceros, Rhinoceros sondaicus since the 1930s
- Indian rhinoceros, Rhinoceros unicornis since the 1930s
- Barasingha, Rucervus duvaucelii since the 1950s

== See also ==
- Wildlife of Bangladesh
- Fauna of Bangladesh
- List of chordate orders
- Lists of mammals by region
- Mammal classification
