= Fauna of Bangladesh =

The fauna of Bangladesh includes about 1,600 species of vertebrate fauna and about 1,000 species of invertebrate fauna based on incomplete records. The vertebrate fauna consists of roughly 22 species of amphibians, 708 species of fish, 126 species of reptiles, 628 species of birds and 113 species of mammals. The invertebrate fauna includes about 30 species of aphids, 20 species of bees, 178 species of beetles, 135 species of flies, 400 species of spiders, 150 species of lepidopterans 52 species of decapods, 30 species of copepods, 2 species of starfish, and some species of sand dollars, sea cucumbers, and sea urchins.

Bangladesh's wide variety of ecological conditions, encompassing the long sea coast, numerous rivers and their tributaries, lakes, haors, baors, ponds and other forms of wetlands, lowland evergreen forests of tropical nature, semi-evergreen forest, hill forests, moist deciduous forests, swamps, and flat lands with tall grasses, has ensured the vast diversity of species found in the country. However, the increasing population, unplanned urbanization and expansion of agriculture and industry have been significantly affecting the ecological structure of Bangladesh, leaving several species extinct and many others endangered.

== Invertebrates ==
The invertebrate fauna so far recorded in Bangladesh comprises about 1,000 species. 18 species of bees have been discovered. Most of them are solitary bees consisting of 11 species. The rest include 4 of honeybees, 2 of bumblebees and the only stingless bee species, Trigona fuscobaltiata.

There are a total of 35 species of scarab dung beetles found under 8 genera. The most common genus is Onthophagus. Another 30 species of leaf-eating scarabeids are also found. The ladybirds includes about 97 species, 80 of which are beneficial. 20 species of fireflies have also been discovered in the country.

The most common indoor flies include housefly, the lesser housefly, the stable fly, the blue bottle fly, the green bottle flies and the flesh flies. The common outdoor flies include the black flies, the deer flies, the horse flies, the hover flies, the crane flies and some muscoids. There are also some 113 species of mosquitos discovered in Bangladesh, the most common genera are Anopheles, Culex, Aedes, Mansonia, Psorophora and Haemagogus.

More than 400 species of spiders are found under 134 genera, and 22 families. The largest family is Araneidae, consisting of some 90 species.

About 124 species of butterflies have been discovered. Most of the species dwell in the northeast and southeast regions of the country. There are also some species of moths, most commonly the snout moths, Scirpophaga incertulas, Chilo polychrysus, Cnaphalocrocis medinalis, Achyra nudalis, Scirpophaga nivella, Leucinodes orbonalis, Corcyra cephalonica, Plodia interpunctella and soforth.

Many species of fresh and marine-water crabs, shrimps and lobsters have also been recorded in Bangladesh. 4 species of freshwater and 11 species of marine crabs have been discovered. The most commercially exploited species of the coastal area is Scylla serrata (mud crab). There are at least two species of king crabs found in the coastal zone. About 10 species of freshwater shrimp/prawns and 19 species of marine shrimps are recorded. Six species of lobsters are found to occur in the Bay of Bengal, Panulirus polyphagus and Thenus orientalis are the two most commercially important species. Daphnia is a common freshwater genus among the 20 copepod species. Two species of starfish have also been recorded.

== Vertebrates ==
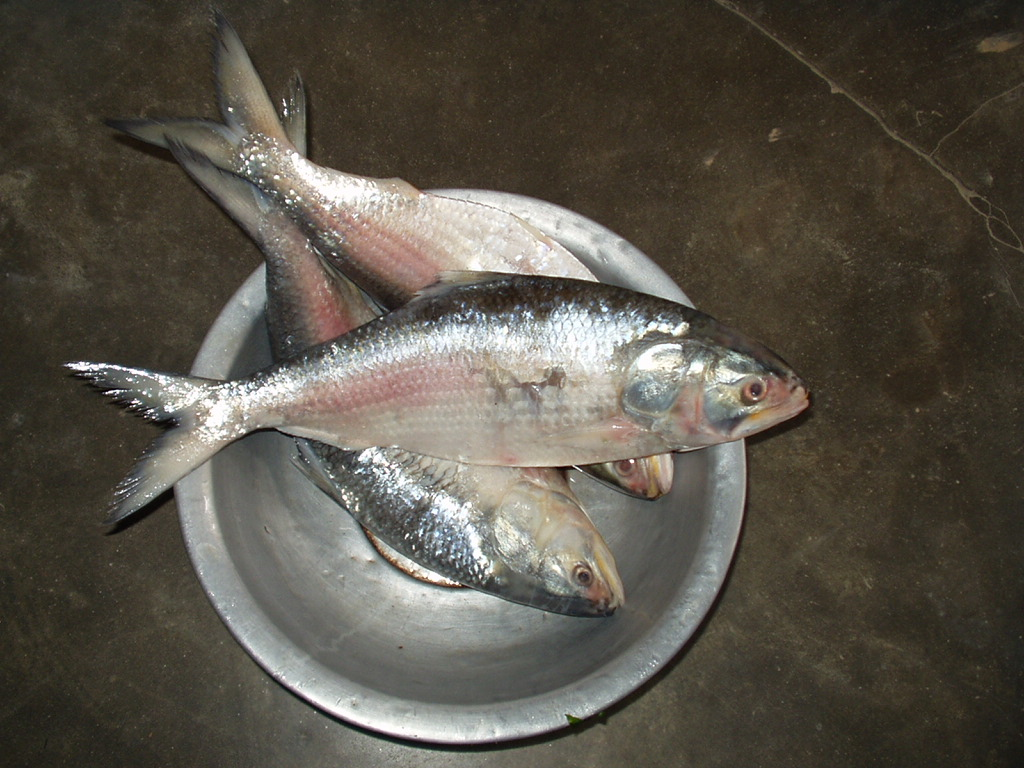
Ilish (Tenualosa ilisha) is the national fish of Bangladesh

The vertebrate fauna includes about 1,600 species. Fishes hold the largest number of species among them. Of the 708 species of fishes, 442 are marine and the rests are of fresh and brackish waters. The marine fishes are split into 18 orders and 123 families. Their species include 56 of cartilaginous fishes and 386 of bony fishes. The 266 species of inland fishes belong to 61 families, of which Cyprinidae is the largest, having 61 species. There are also 55 species of catfishes found in the fresh waters of Bangladesh.

The amphibians in Bangladesh include only the species of the order Anura. From the 22 amphibian species, 8 are recognized as threatened. The number of reptiles species found is 126 which includes 109 inland and 17 marine species. From the 109 inland reptiles, 3 are crocodilians, 21 turtles and tortoises, 18 lizards, and 67 snakes. The marine reptiles comprise 12 snakes and 5 turtles.

There are 628 species of birds found in Bangladesh under 16 orders and 67 families, including 276 passerines. Resident species total 388 (including 171 passerines) under 16 orders and 60 families, while the remaining 240 species (including 105 passerines) under 10 orders and 33 families are migratory. The mammals of Bangladesh comprise 110 species of inland mammals under 12 orders and 35 families, and three species of marine mammals only from the order Cetacea.

== Conservation efforts ==
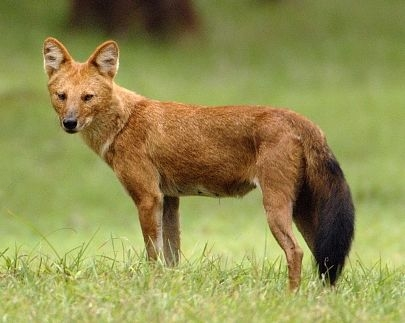
The most endangered Asiatic top predator of 2010, the dhole is on edge of extinction. There remain less than 2500 members of the species in the world.

So far a number of creatures have disappeared completely from the country and a further 201 species are threatened. The dhole, also called the Asiatic wild dog, is now endangered by habitat and prey-species loss and human persecution. Notable animal species that have disappeared from Bangladesh are the greater one-horned rhinoceros, the Asian two-horned rhinoceros, the banteng, swamp deer, Indian wolf, wild water buffalo and common peafowl. The majority of the human population lives in or around large cities, and this has helped to limit deforestation to some extent. However, the growth rate continues to increase and this has placed large demands on the environment and lead to subsequent clearing of numerous natural habitats. Though several areas are protected under law, a large portion of Bangladeshi wildlife is threatened by this growth.

In 2016, conservationists surveying the rural Chittagong Hill Tracts region of Bangladesh took the country's first ever photos of the sun bear and gaur. Moreover, the team also captured photos of the Himalayan serow, Asian golden cat, sambar deer, barking deer, leopard cat and dhole. Locals in the Chittagong Hill Tracts led conservationists to a new population of Arakan forest turtle. Once thought extinct, the critically endangered species was assumed only to survive in neighbouring Myanmar.

Olive ridley sea turtles nest on the shores of Bangladesh, where they are threatened by marine plastic pollution.

== Gallery ==
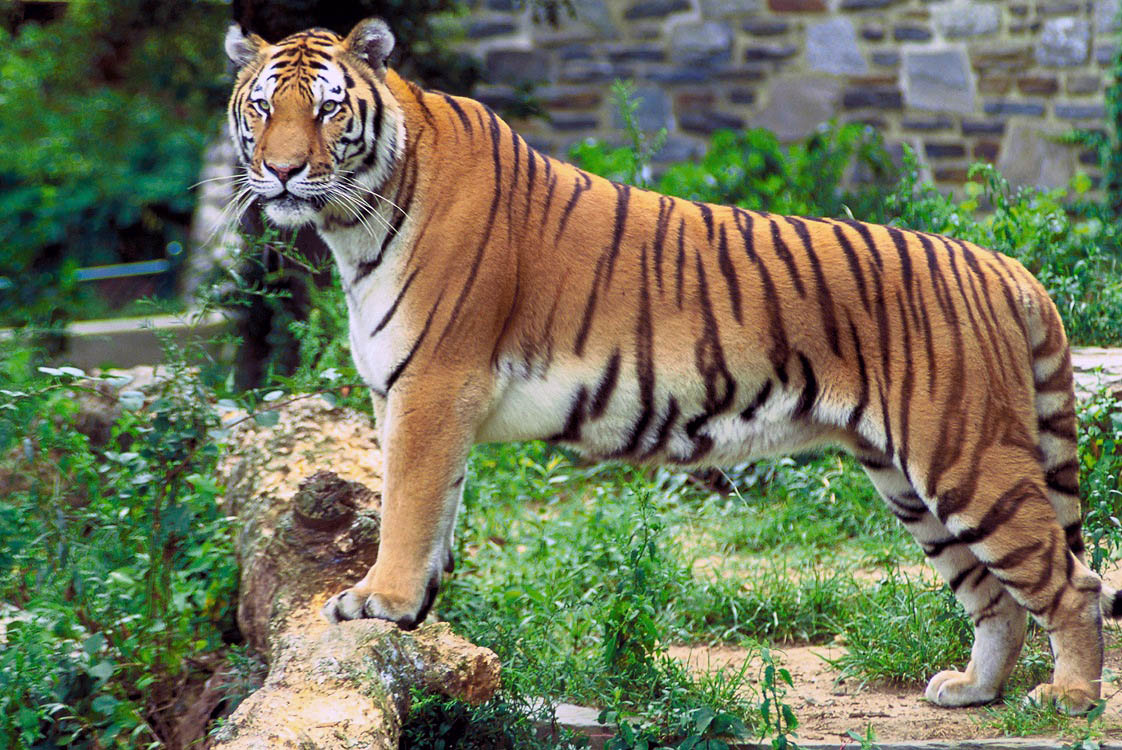
The Bengal tiger is the national symbol of Bangladesh

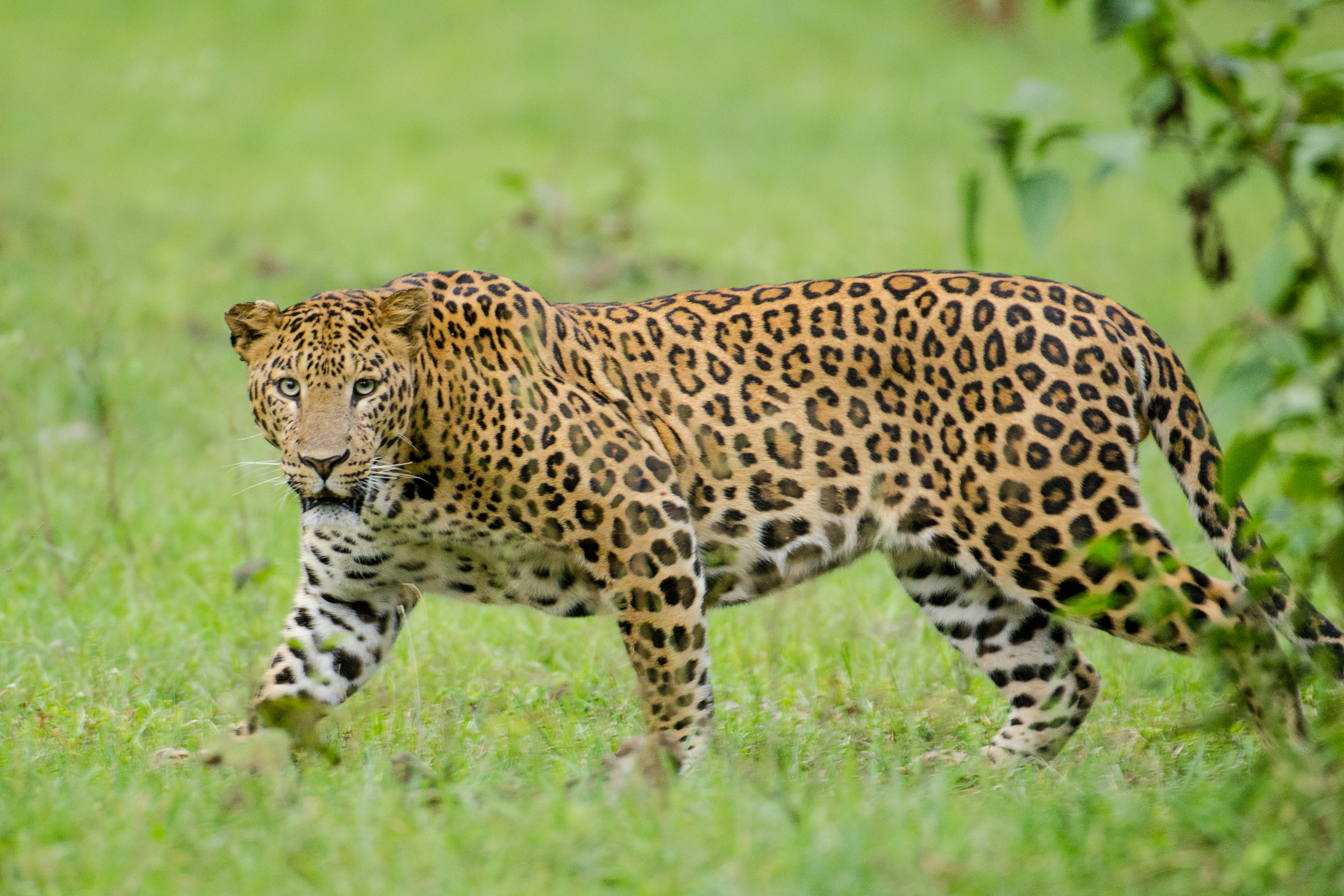
Indian leopards can be found in the Chittagong Hill Tracts of Bangladesh

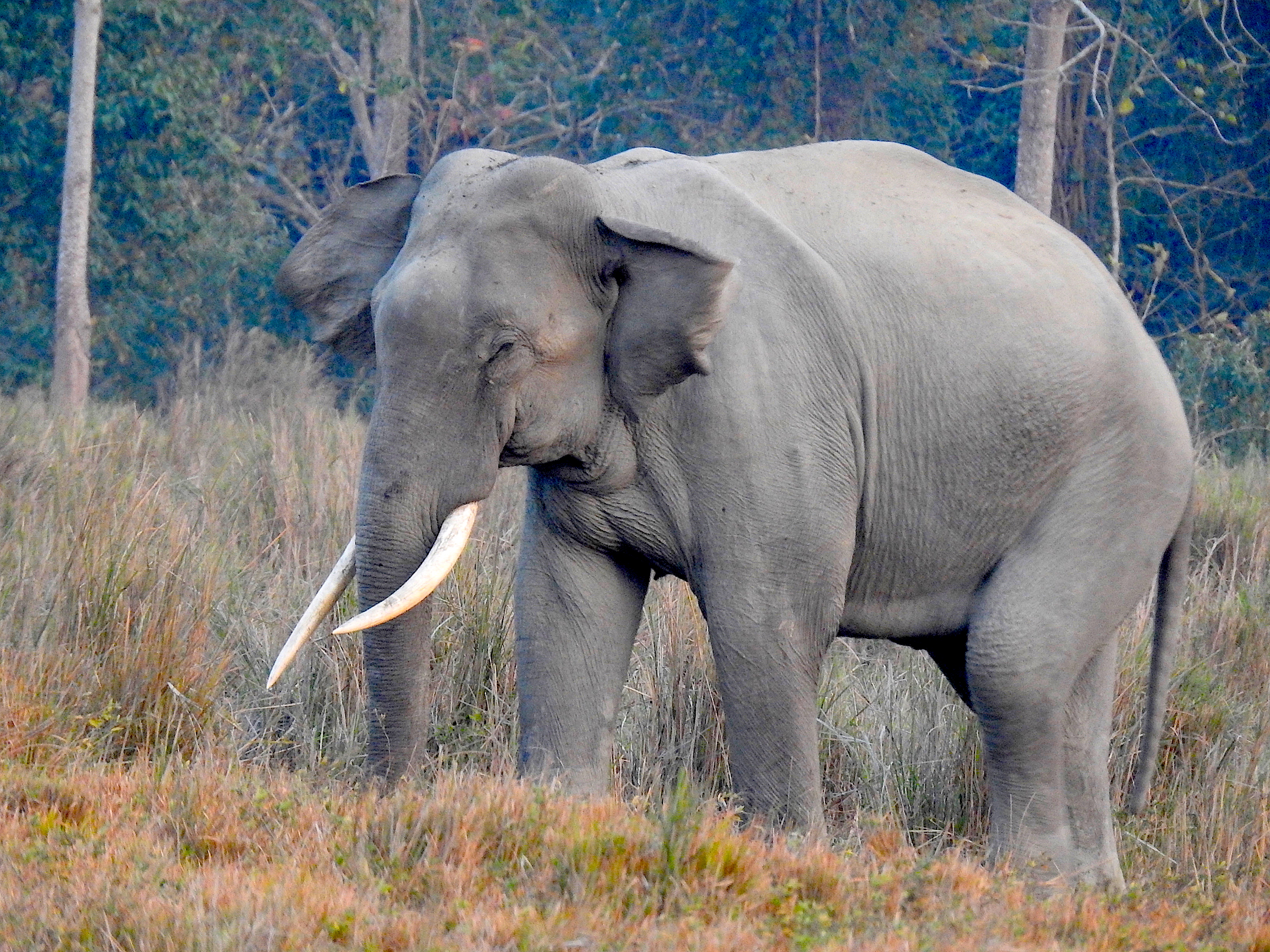
Wild Indian elephants can be seen in hilly areas of Bangladesh

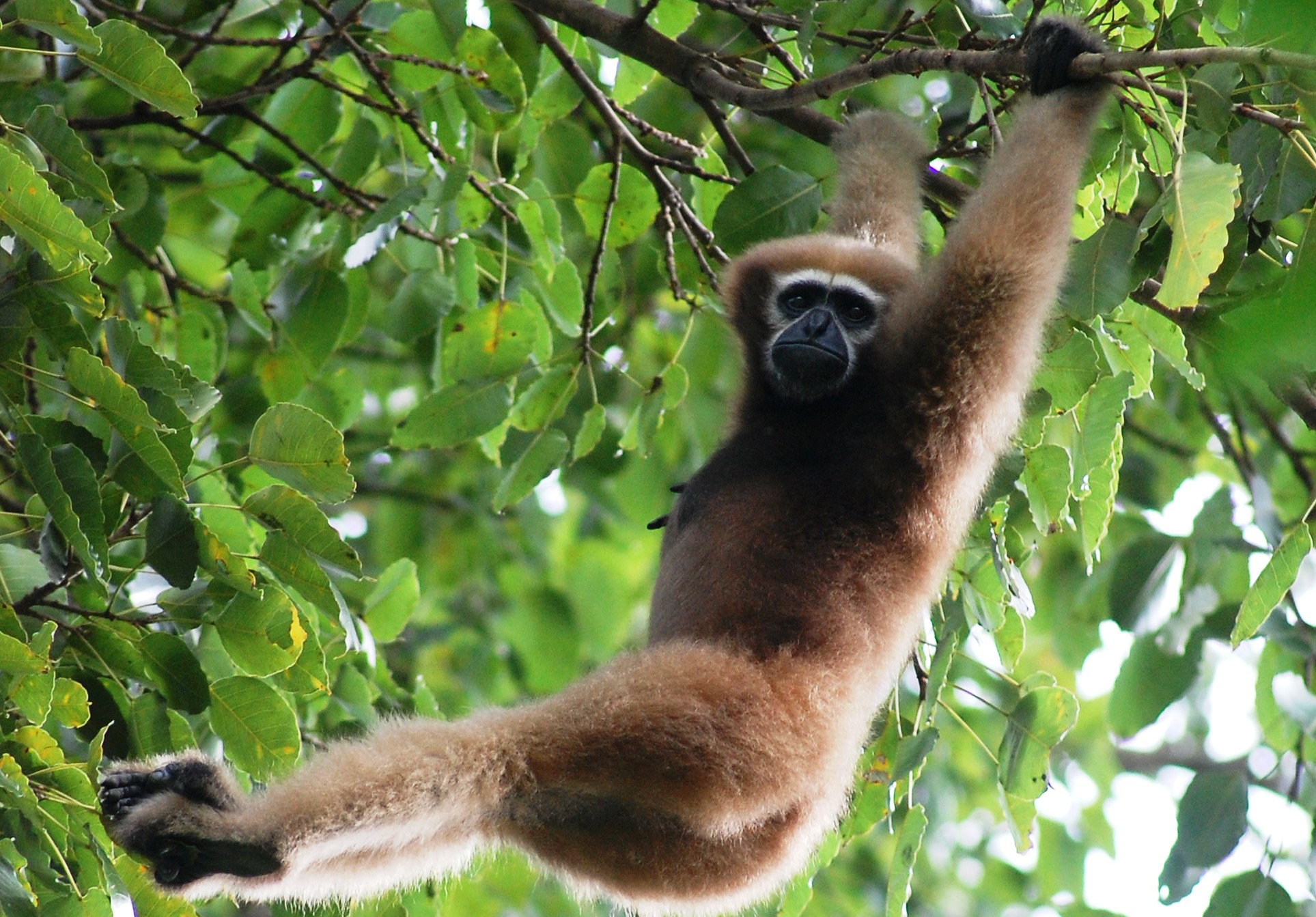
Hoolock gibbon in Bangladesh

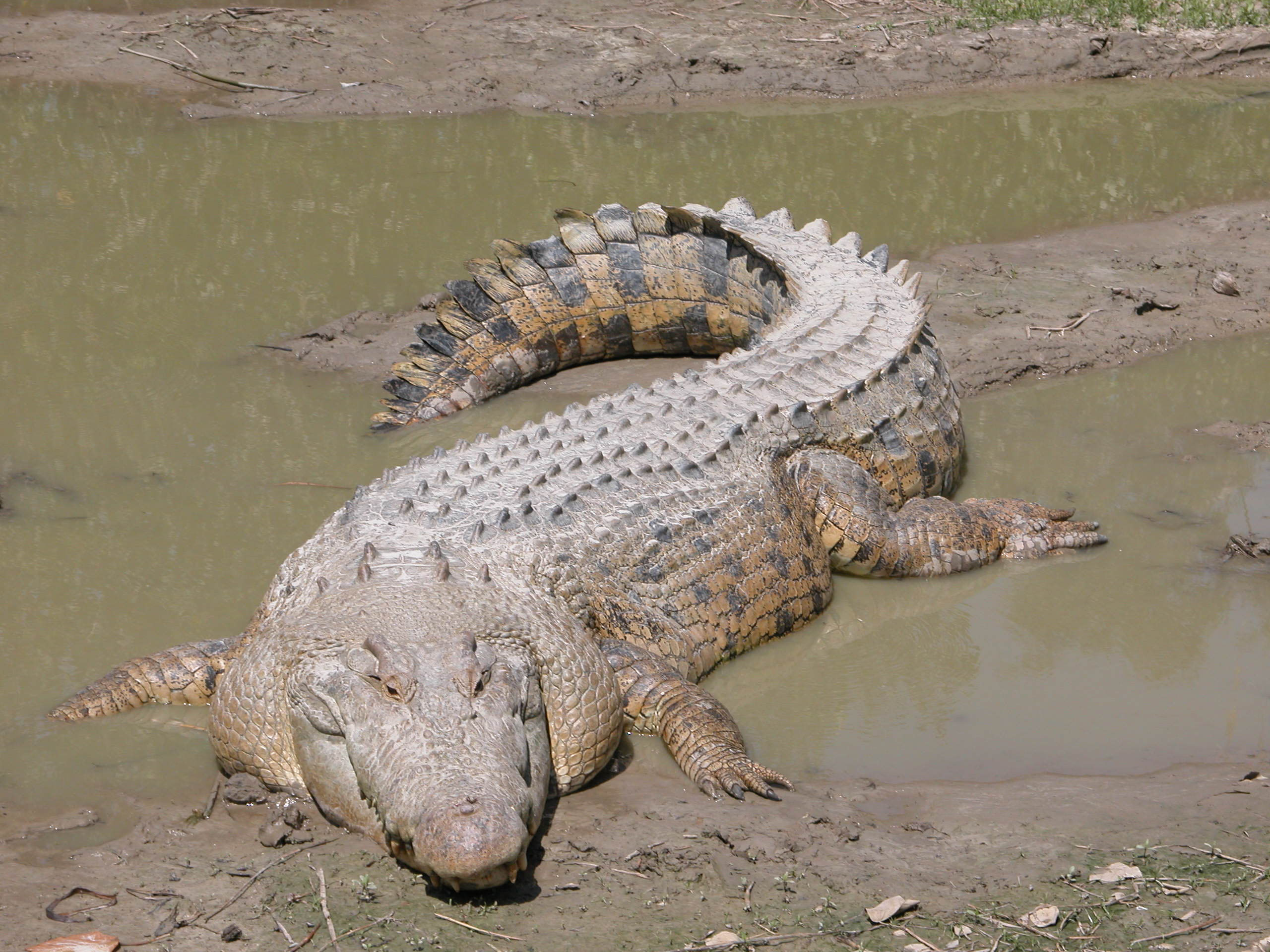
The saltwater crocodile is the largest of all living reptiles

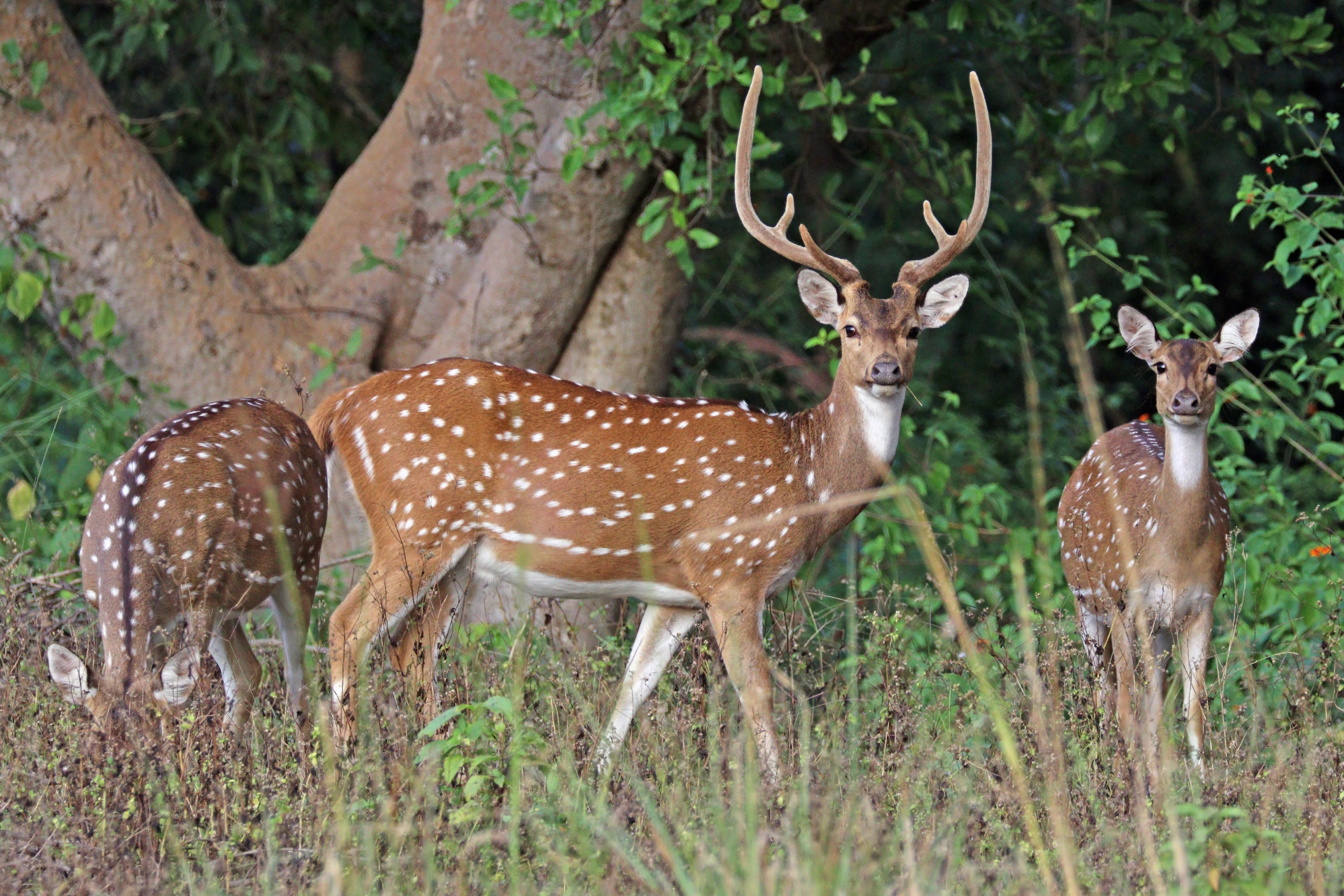
Chital deer are widely seen in Sundarbans and other mangrove forests

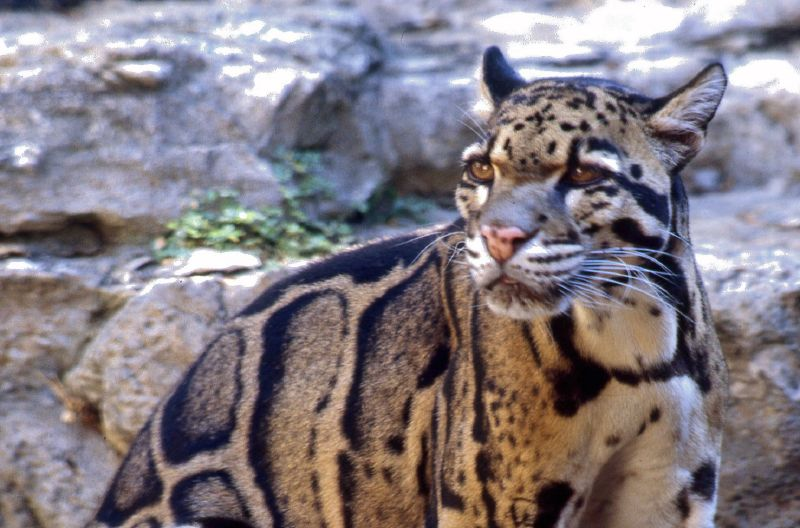
Clouded leopards can be found in the southeastern part

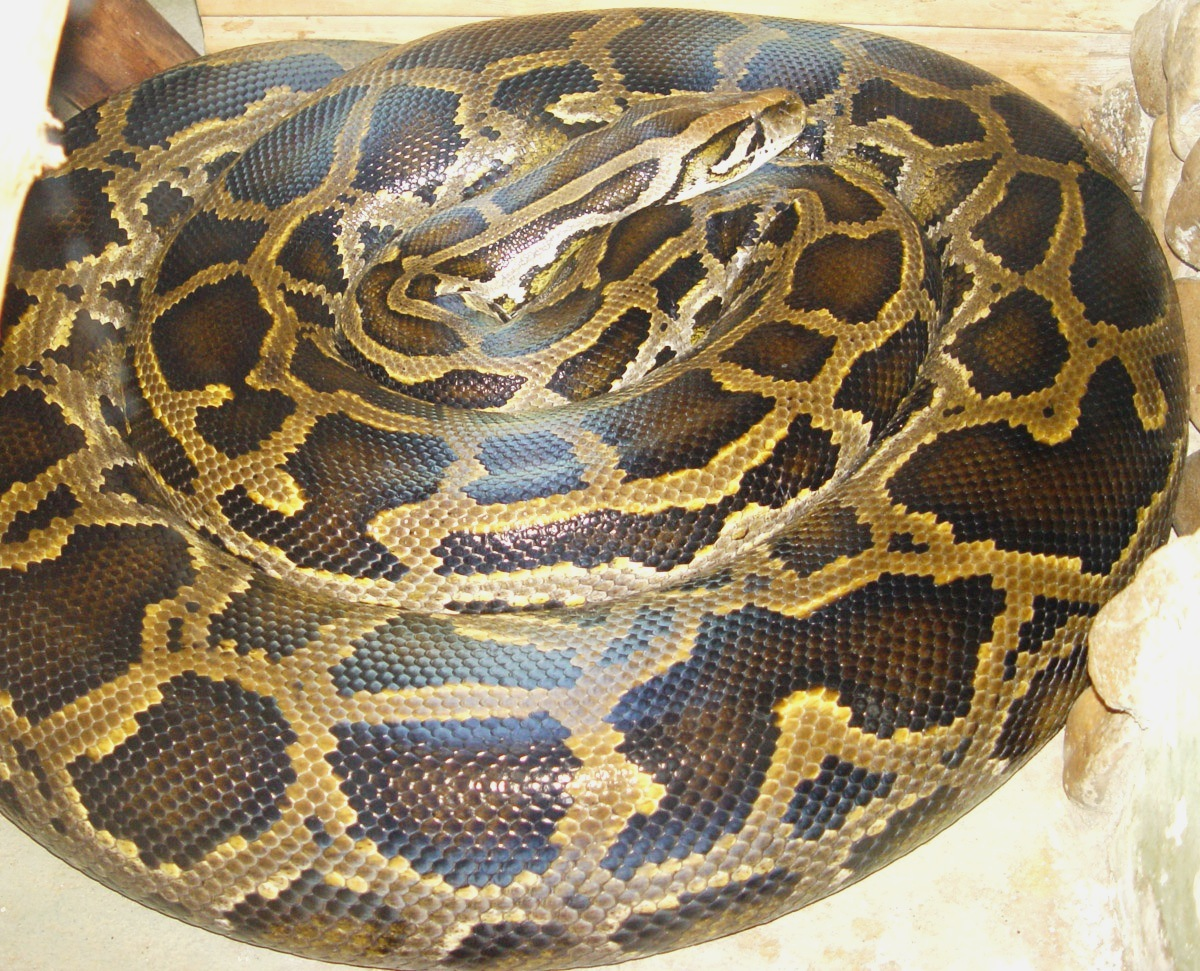
Python reticulatus is the world's longest snake and longest reptile

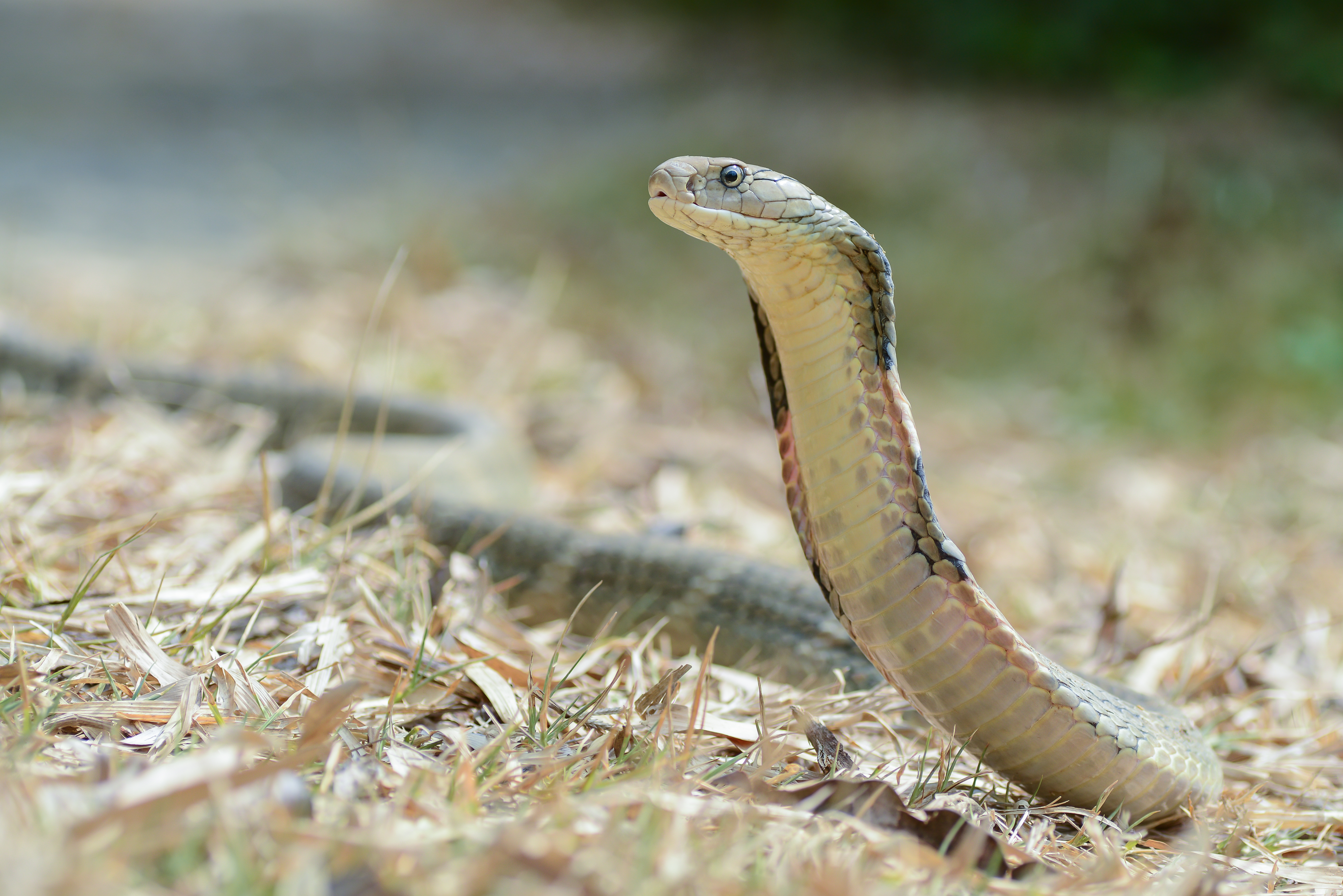
The king cobra is the world's longest venomous snake

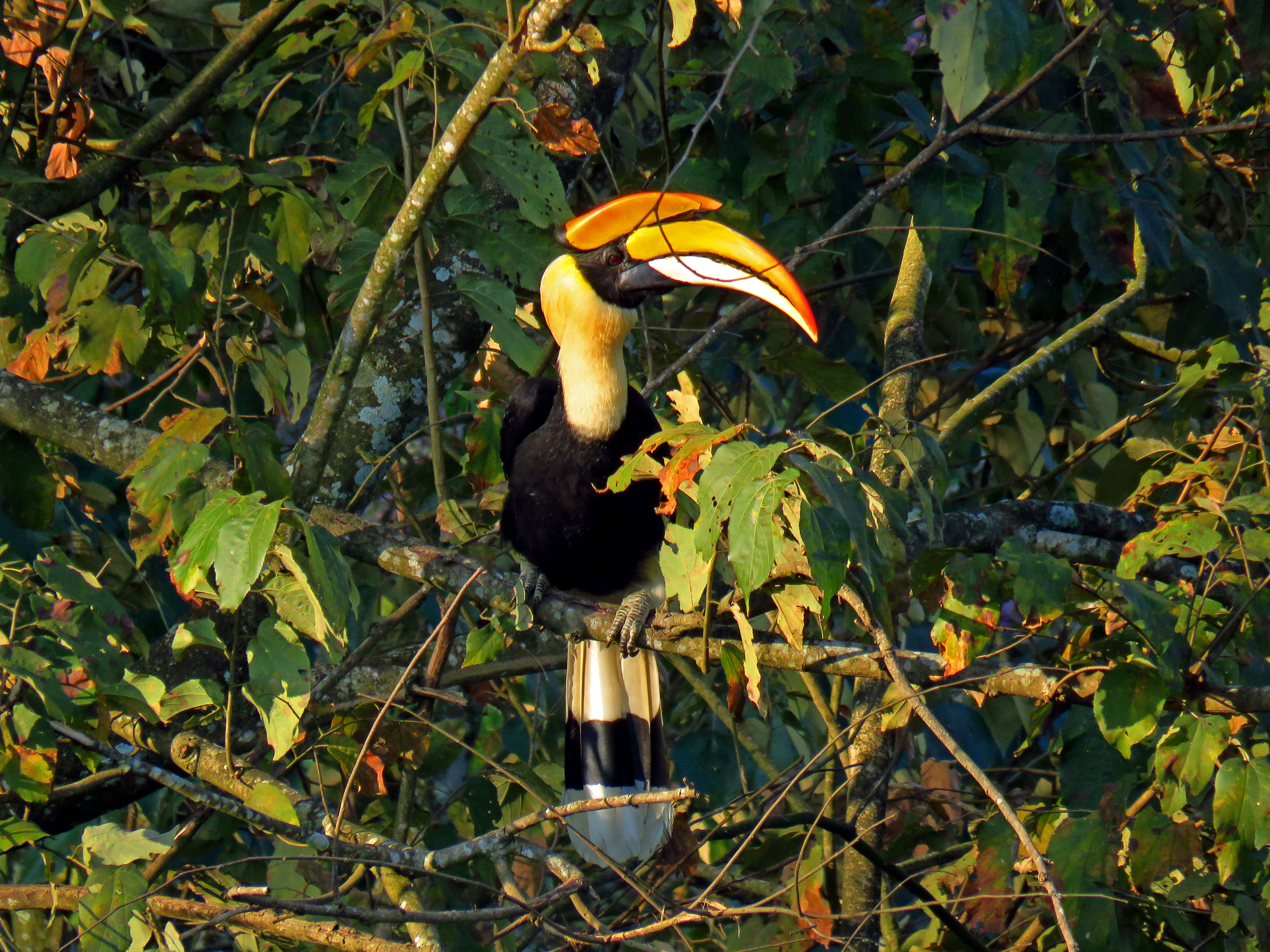
Great hornbill

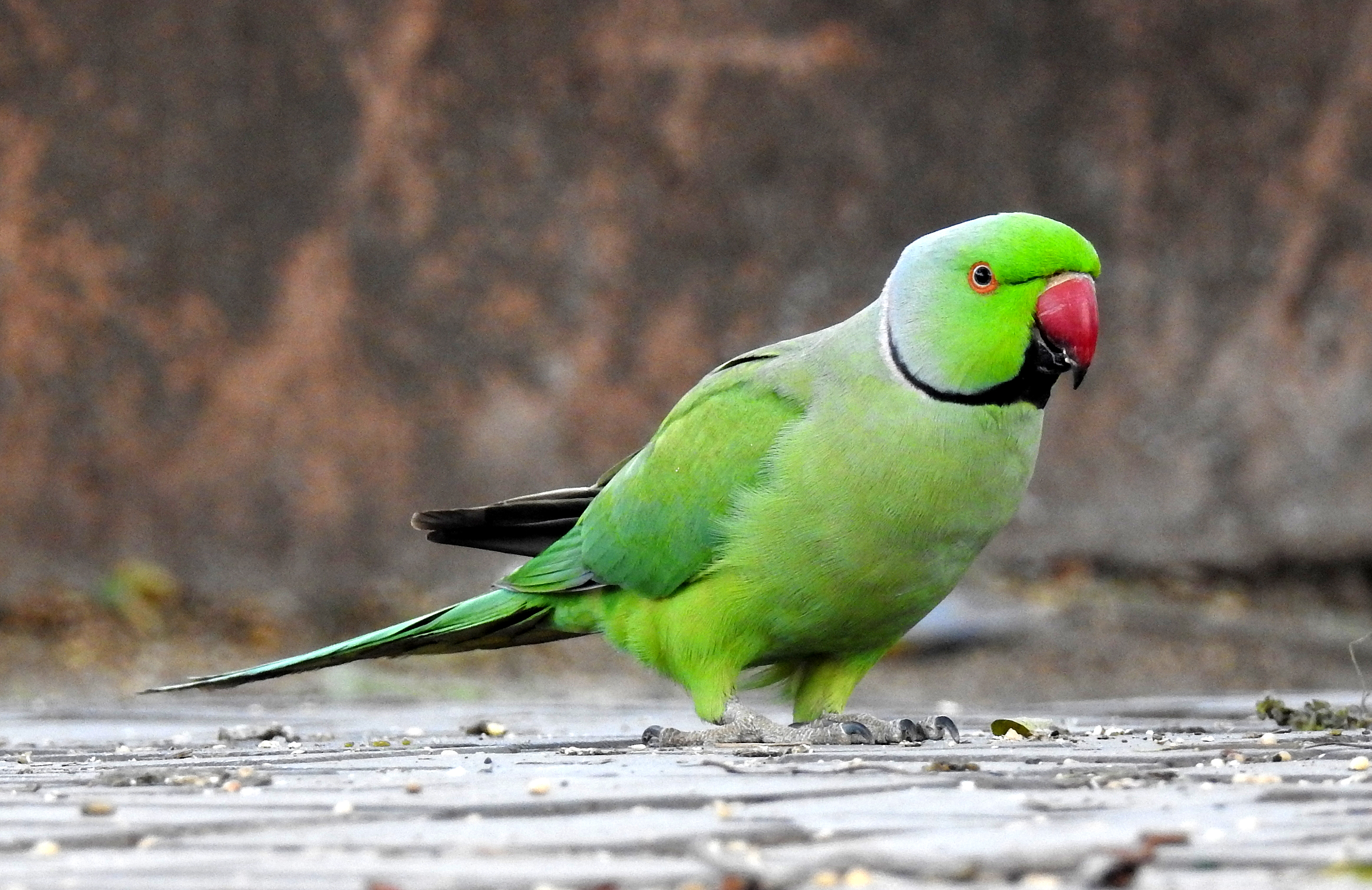
Rose-ringed parakeet

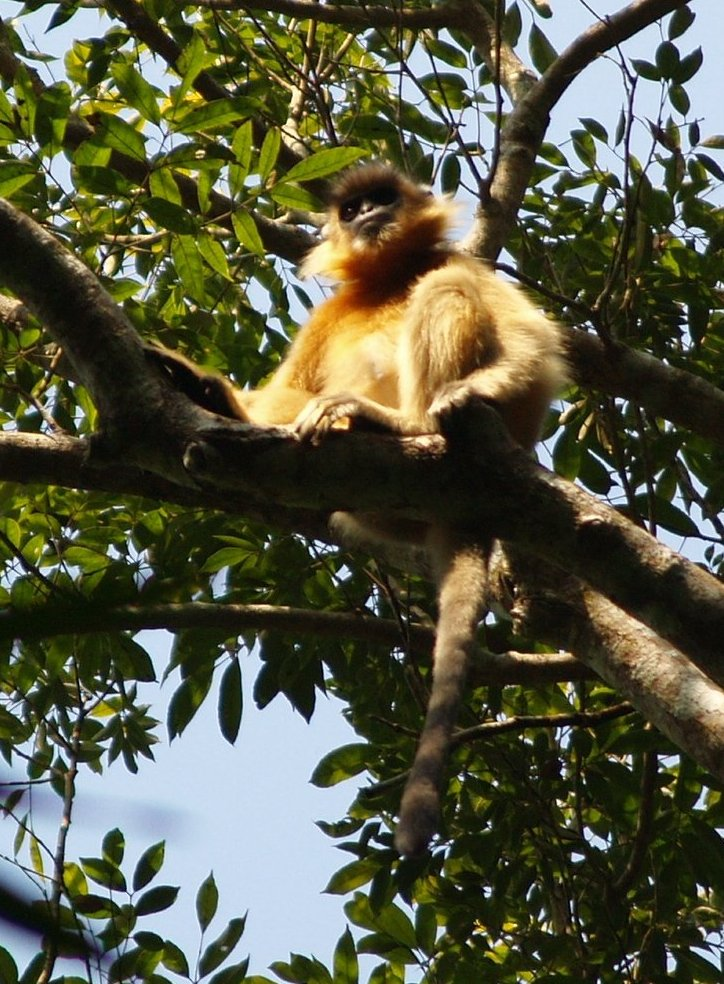
Capped langur at Lawachara National Park

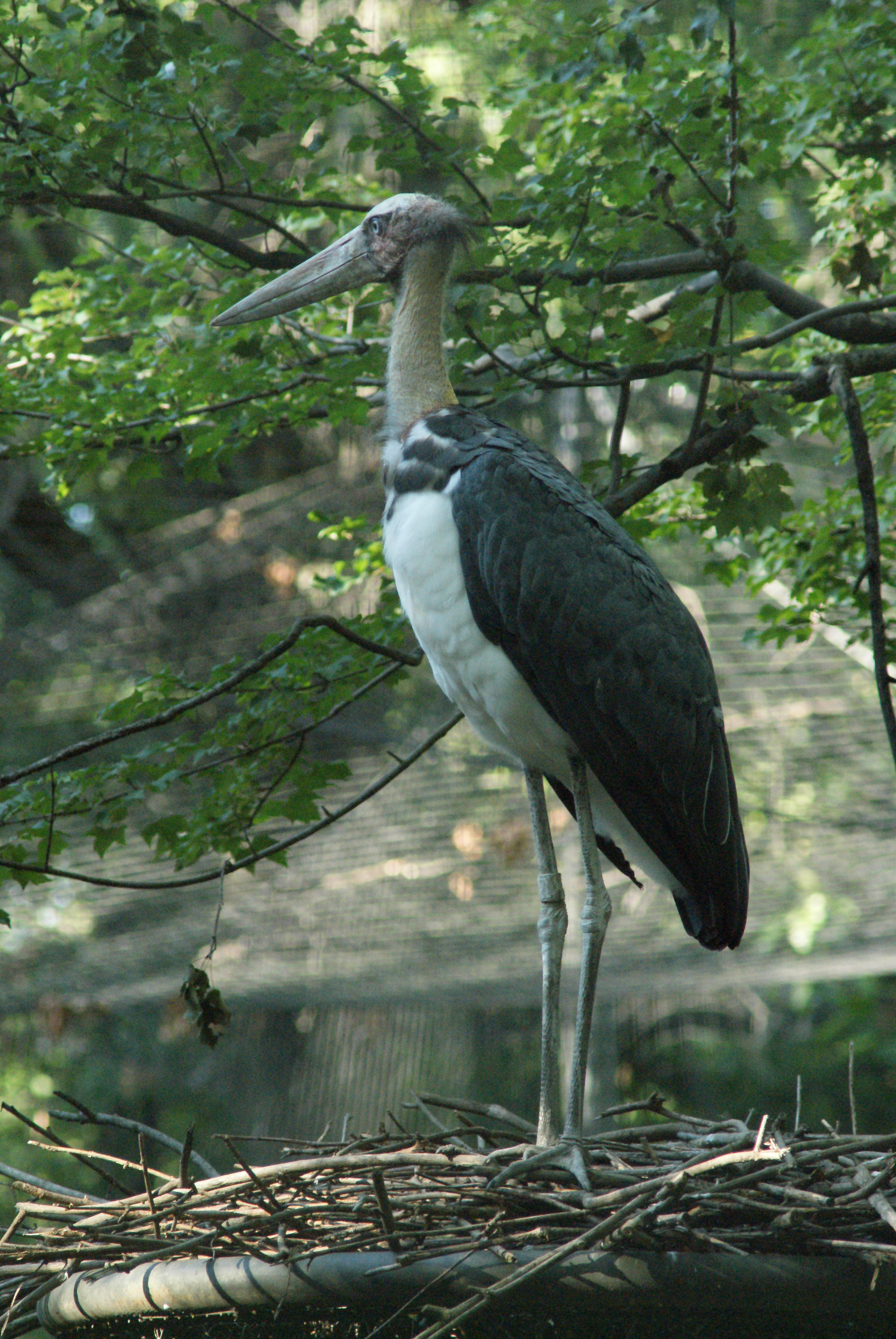
Lesser adjutant

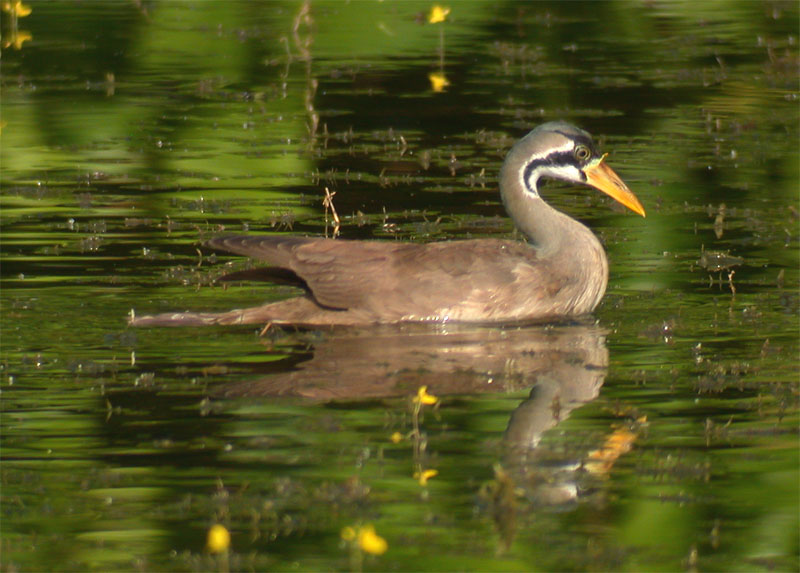
Masked finfoot, a beautiful bird found in mangrove forests.

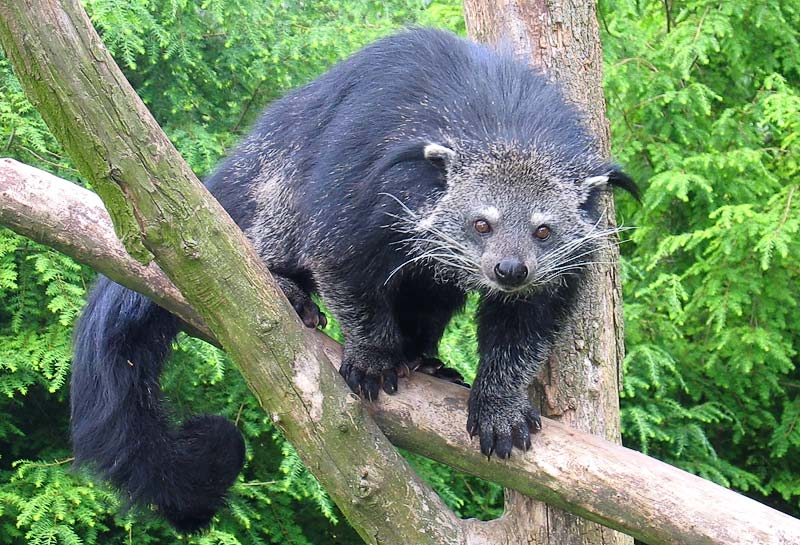
Binturong

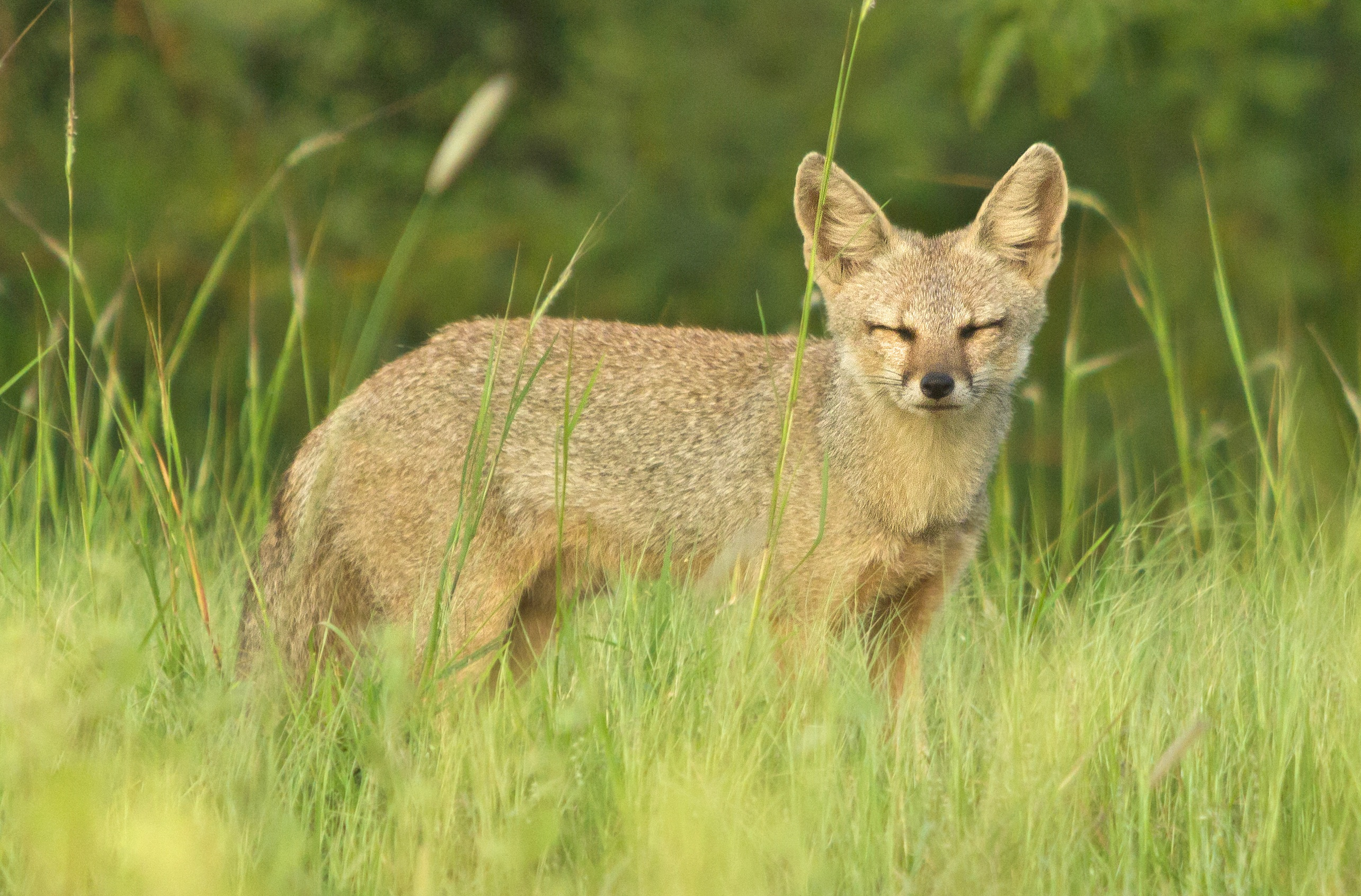
Bengal fox

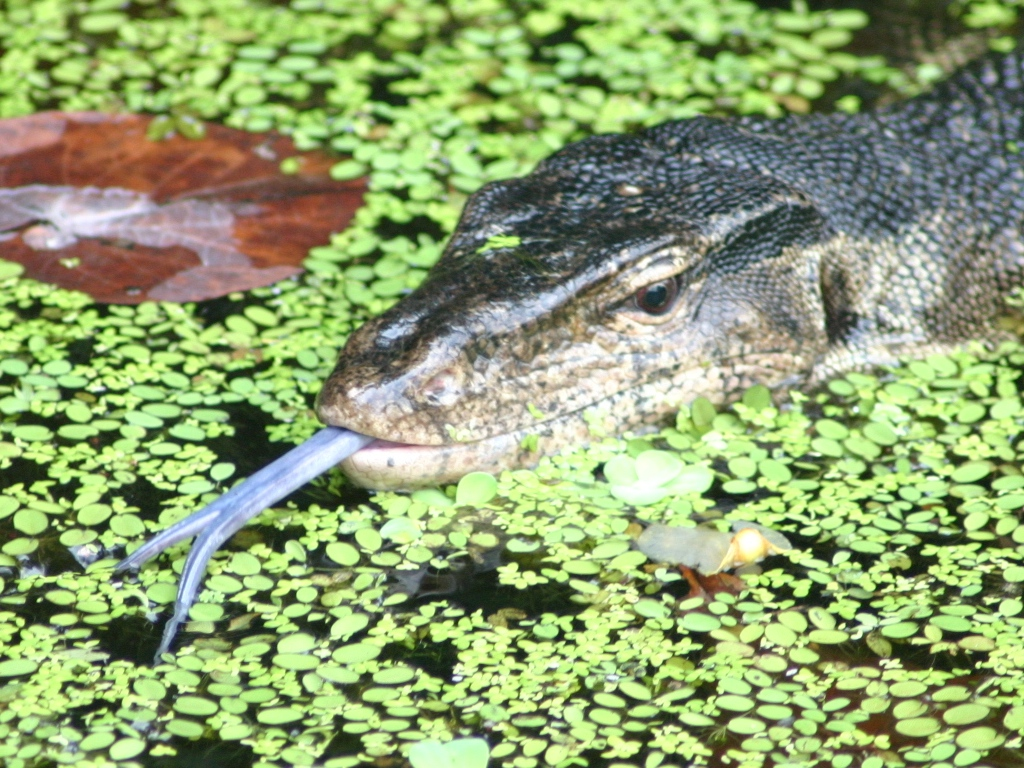
The water monitor it is the world's second-heaviest lizard, after the Komodo dragon.

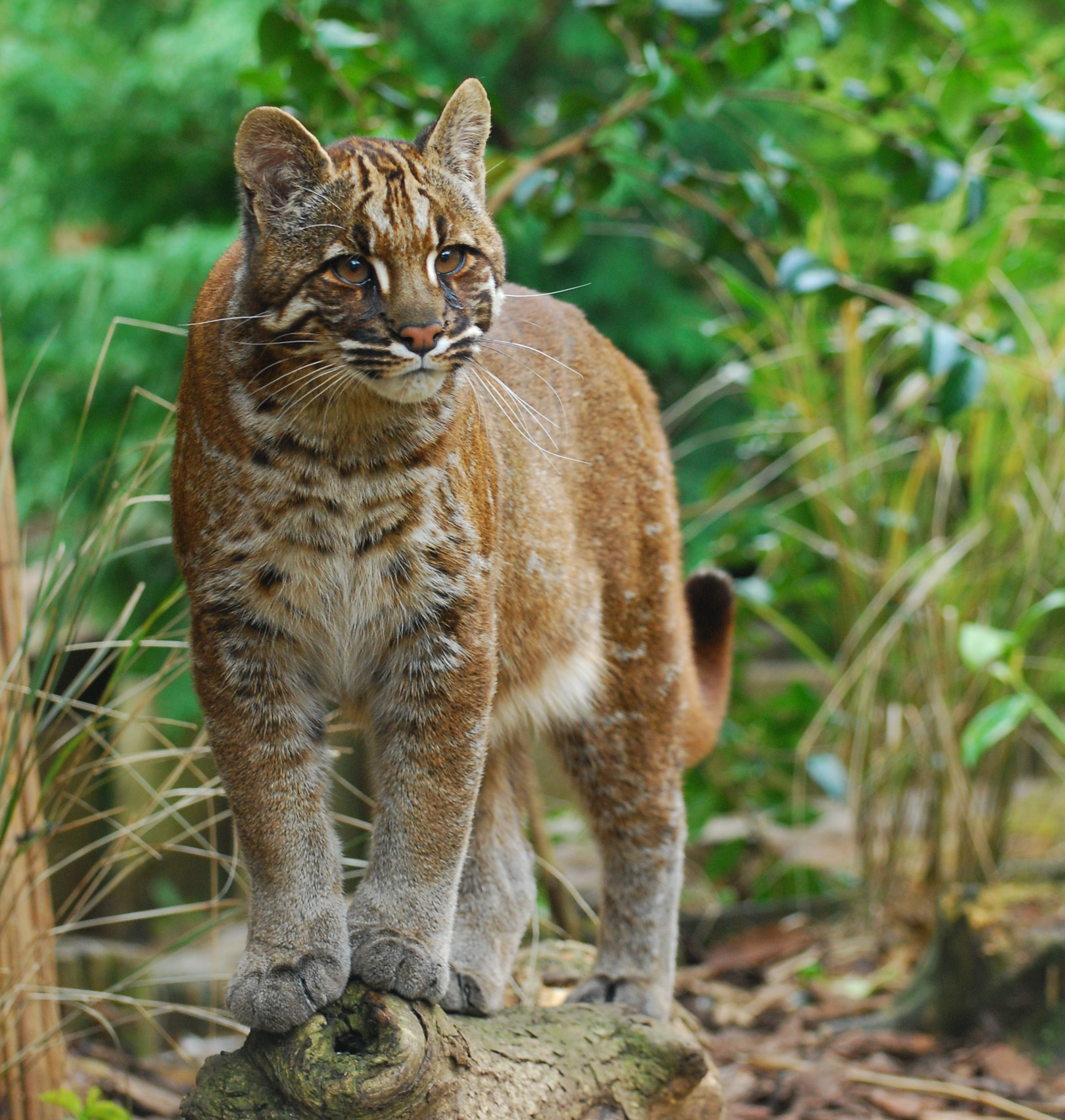
Asian golden cat

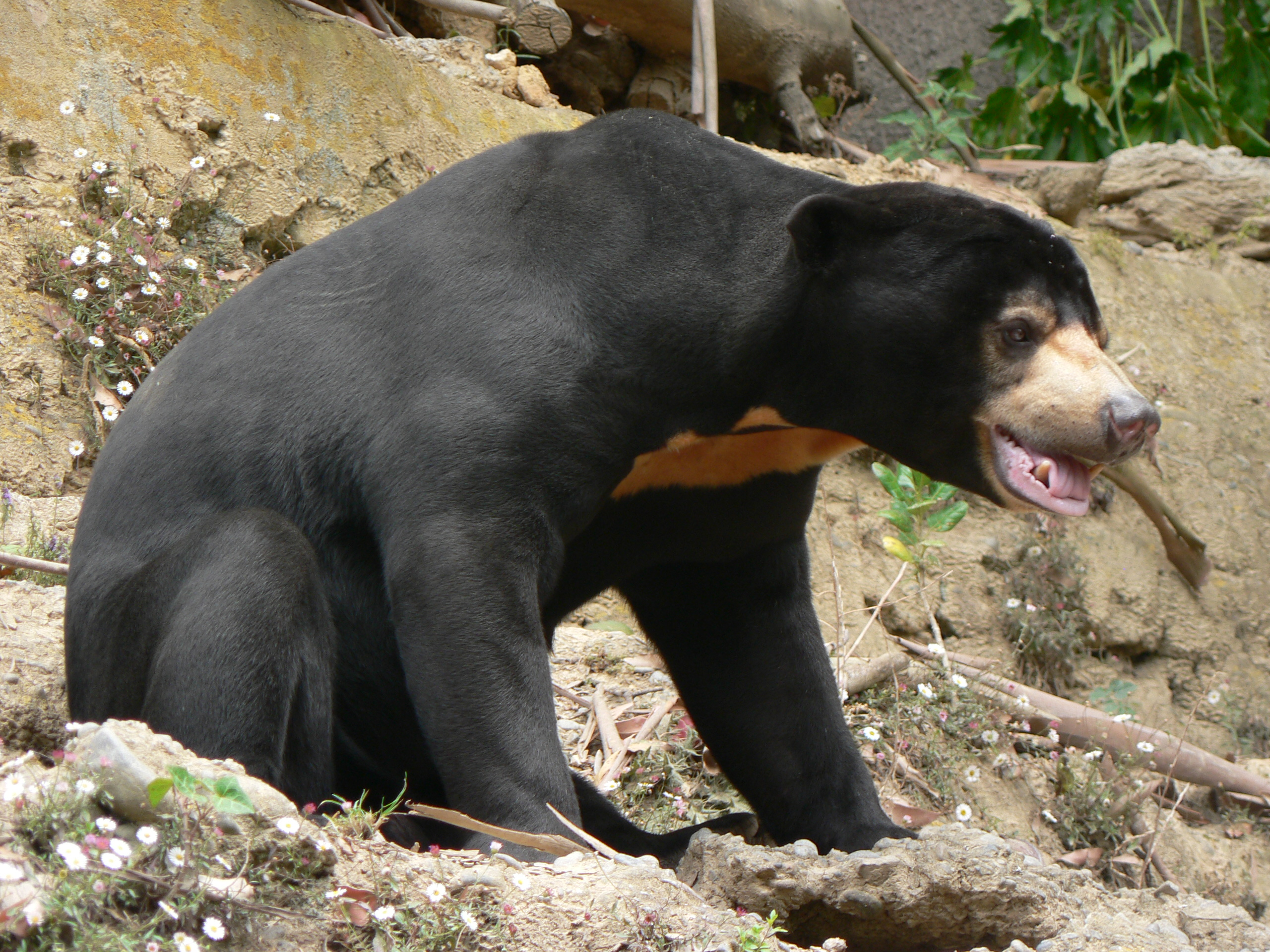
Sun bears can be found in the Chittagong Hill Tracts

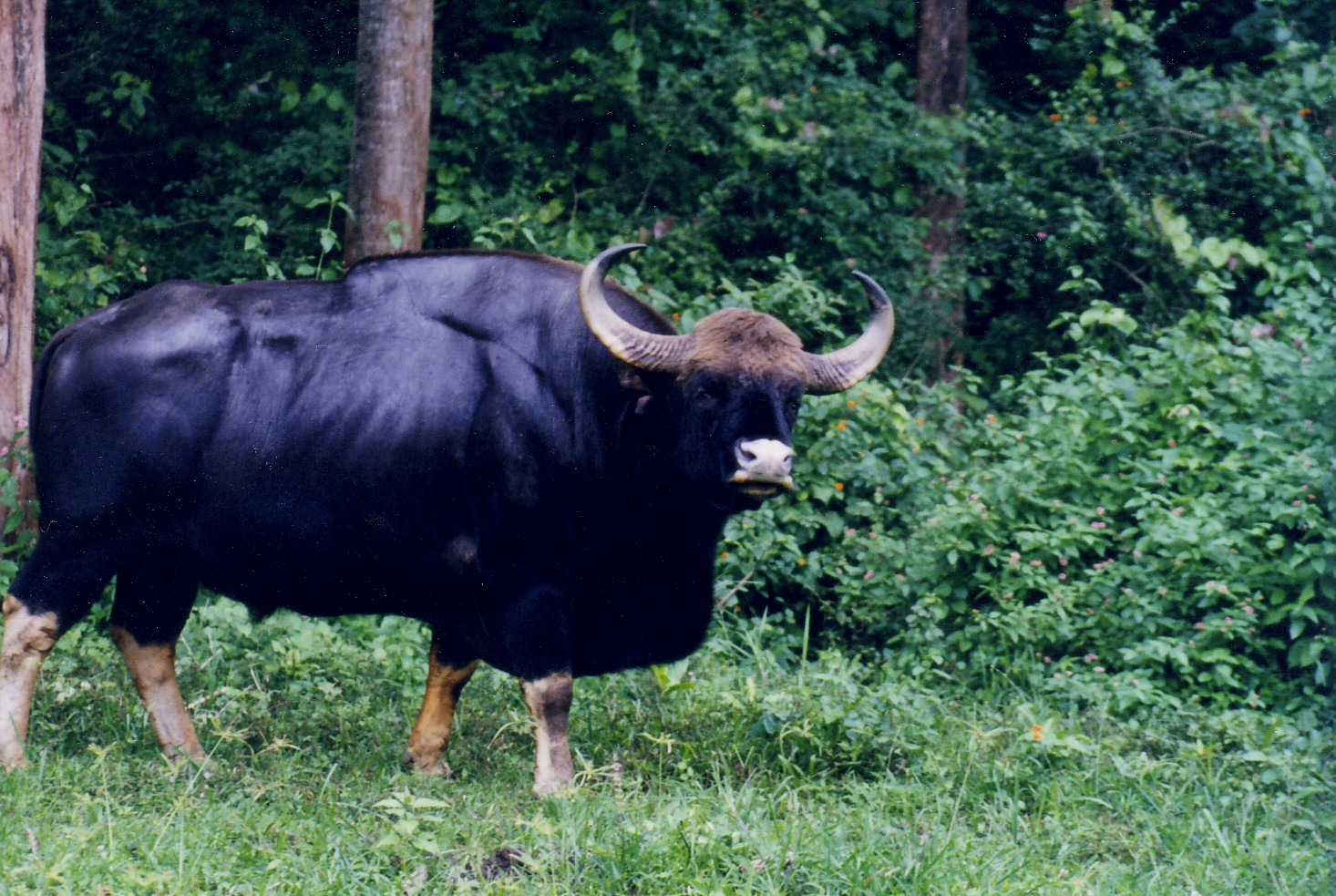
The gaur the largest extant bovine, is native to parts of South Asia and most of Southeast Asia.

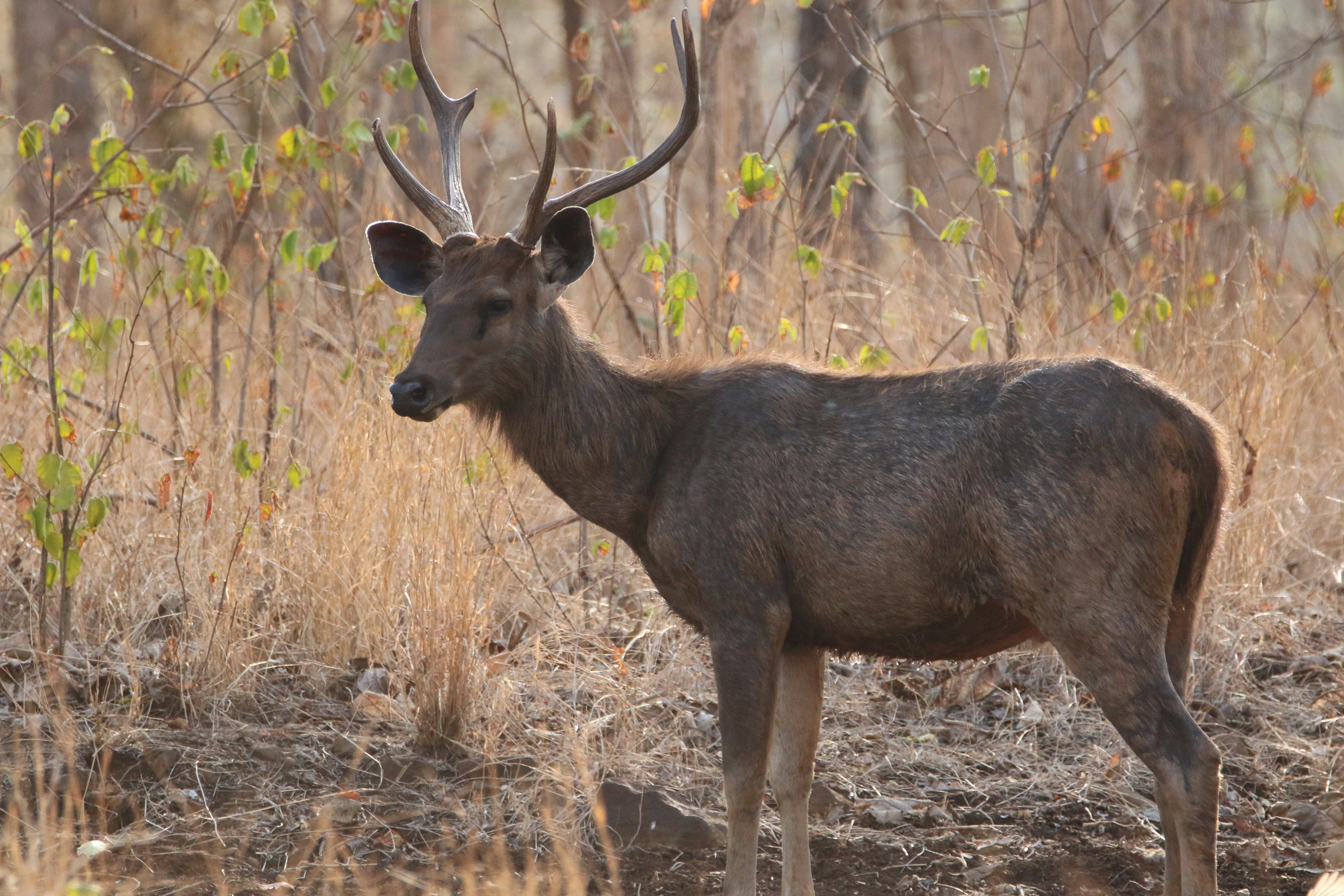
Sambar deer

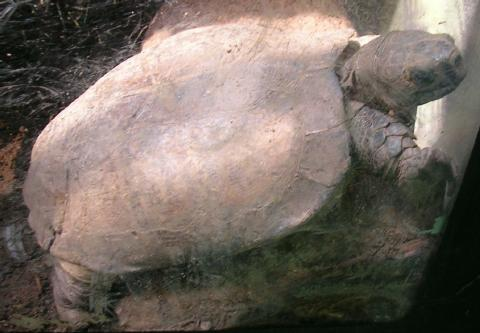
Arakan forest turtle

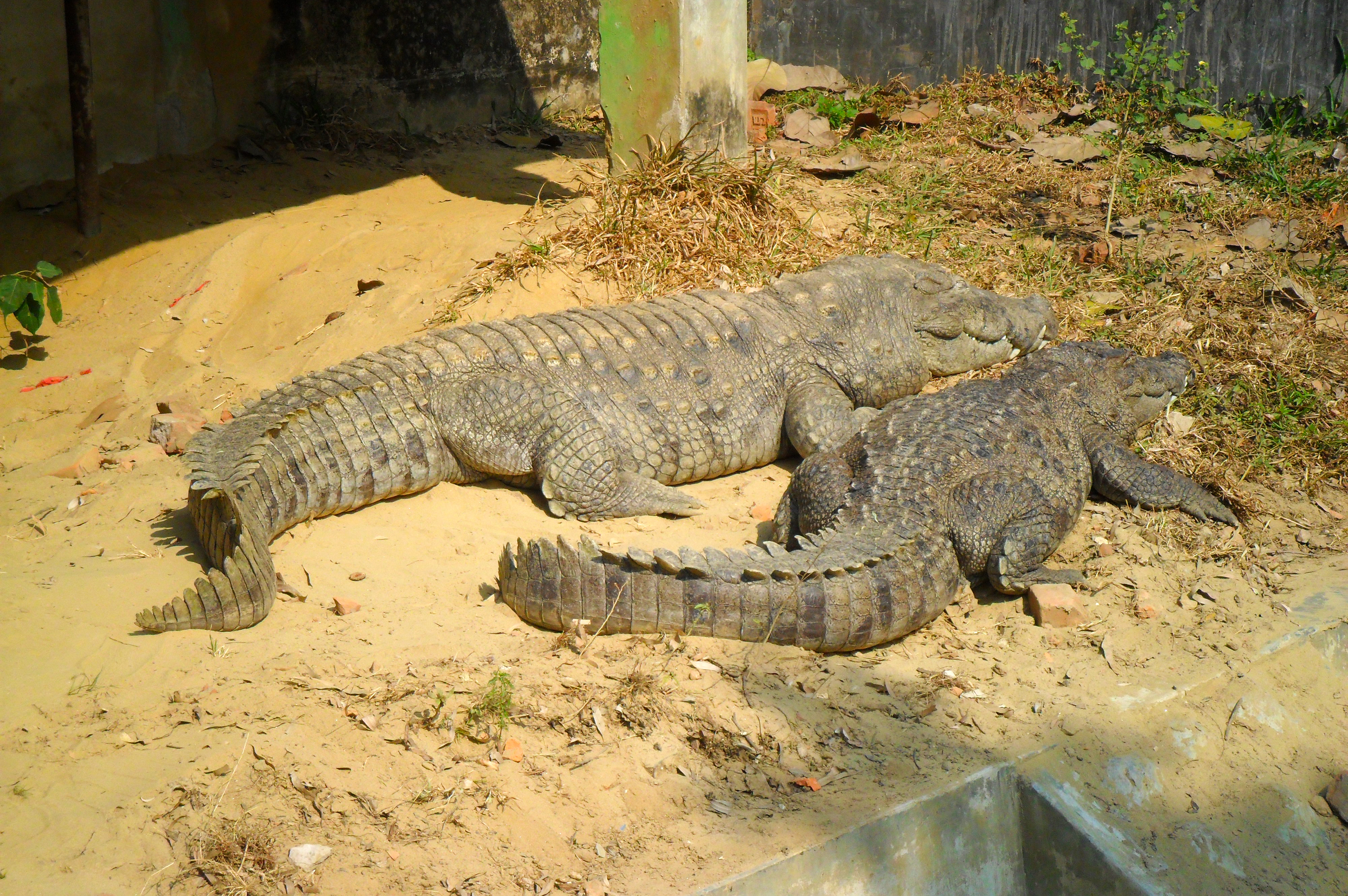
Mugger crocodile

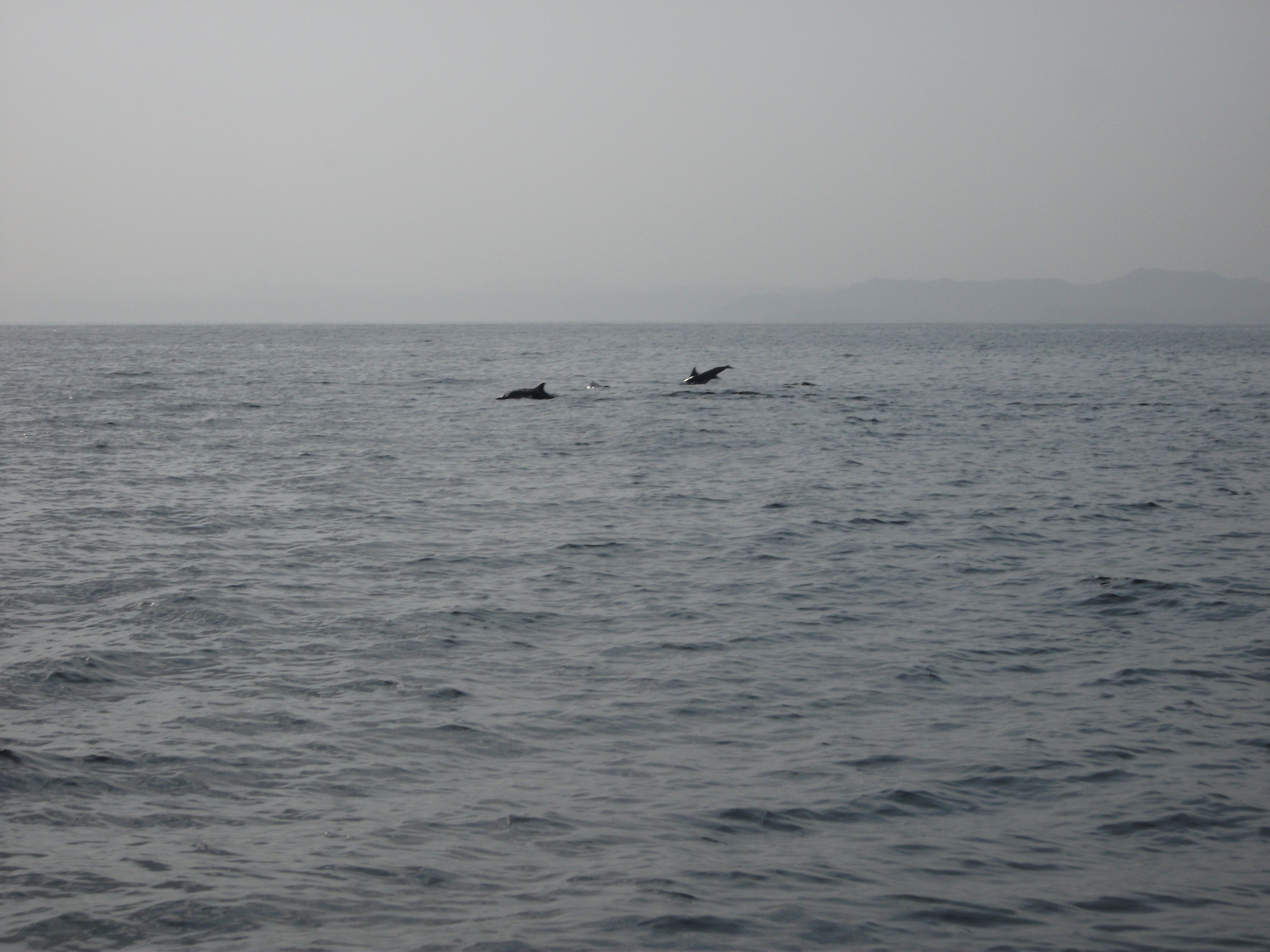
Dolphins in Al Bandar bay

== See also ==
- List of birds of Bangladesh
- List of butterflies of Bangladesh
- List of fishes in Bangladesh
- List of mammals of Bangladesh
