= List of museums in Bangladesh =

This is an alphabetical list of museums in Bangladesh.

List of Museum

1. Ahsan Manzil
2. Bagha Museum
3. Bangabandhu Boat Museum
4. Bangladesh Air Force Museum
5. Bangladesh Maritime Museum
6. Bangladesh Bank Taka Museum
7. Bangladesh Military Museum
8. Bangladesh National Museum
9. Barisal Divisional Museum
10. Birshreshtha Munshi Abdur Rouf Library and Museum
11. Bogra District Council Museum
12. Bangabandhu Memorial Museum
13. Birisiri Upajatya Cultural Academy Museum (Near Mymensingh)
14. Chandpur Fisheries Museum
15. Comilla Rammala Museum
16. Cox's Bazar Fisheries Museum
17. Children's Museum (Shishu Academy)
18. Dhaka Nagar Jadughar
19. Dinajpur Museum
20. Ethnological Museum of Chittagong
21. Fish Museum & Biodiversity Centre
22. Folk Heritage Museum (Bangla Academy)
23. Faridpur Museum
24. Jamalpur Estate Museum, Thakurgoan
25. Kangal Harinath Memorial Museum
26. Kushtia Municipal Museum
27. Khulna Divisional Museum
28. Kishoreganj Museum
29. Lalbagh Fort
30. Liberation War Museum
31. Lokayon Museum
32. Madaripur Museum
33. Archaeological Museum of Mahasthangarh
34. Mainamati
35. Michel Modhusudhan Dutt Museum
36. Museum of Rajas'
37. Museum of Independence, Dhaka
38. National Museum of Science and Technology
39. Museum of Geological Survey of Bangladesh
40. Mymensingh Museum
41. National Art Gallery (Bangladesh)
42. National Museum of Science and Technology
43. Natore Rajbari
44. Osmani Museum
45. Panchagarh Rocks Museum
46. Philatelic Museum
47. Bangladesh Police Liberation War Museum
48. Postal Museum
49. Rangpur Museum
50. Sunamganj Hasan Raja Museum
51. Sonargaon Bangladesh Folk Art Museum (Near Dhaka)
52. Shilaidaha Kuthibari Memorial Museum (Near Kushtia)
53. Shahjadpur Kacharibari Memorial Museum (Near Pabna)
54. Tajhat Palace
55. Tribal Museum
56. Varendra Research Museum
57. Zainul Abedin Museum
58. Zia Memorial Museum
59. Sreemangal Tea Resort and Museum
60. Bengal Center
61. K.B. Ahsanullah (R:) Museum
62. Paharpur Archaeological Museum

== See also ==
- List of museums
- List of libraries in Bangladesh
