= Osmani Museum =

Museum in Sylhet, Bangladesh

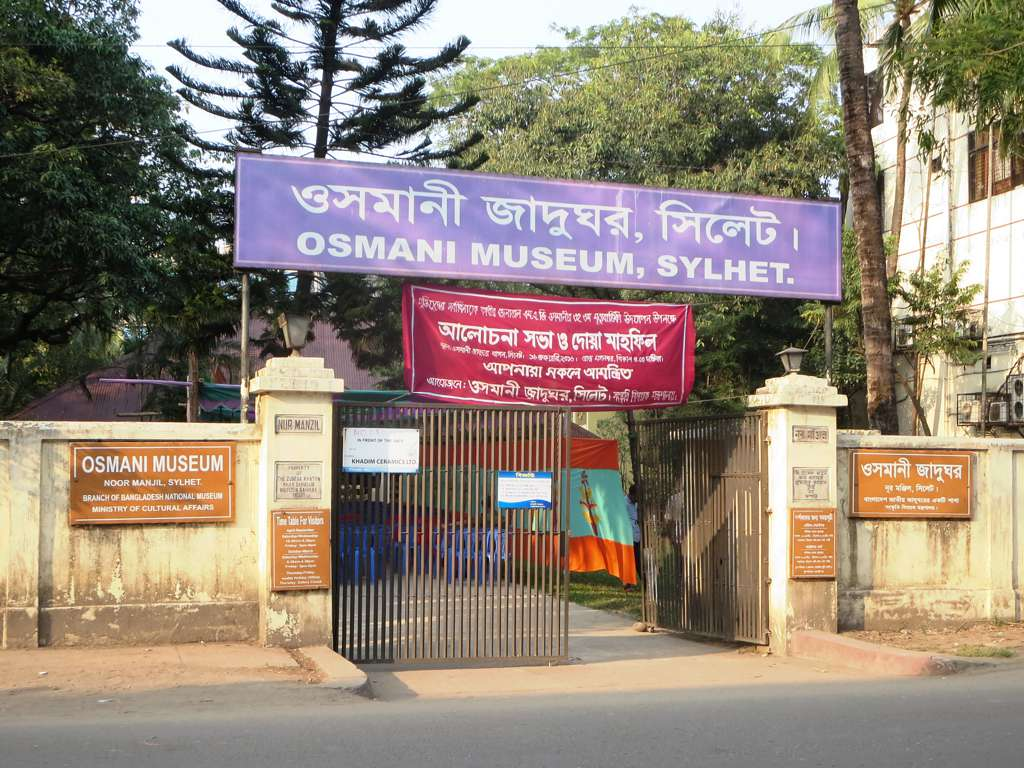
- Osmani Museum

- Location within Bangladesh
- Location: Kotwali Thana of Sylhet, Bangladesh
- Coordinates: 24.8940°N 91.8773°E
- Website: osmanimuseum.org.bd

Osmani Museum is a museum in Kotwali Thana of Sylhet, Bangladesh. The ancestors' home of Bangabir General Muhammad Ataul Gani Osmani, the Commander-in-Chief of Bangladesh Forces (12 April 1971 – 7 April 1972) has been transformed into today's famous "Osmani Museum". It is situated at the heart (Dhopa Dighir Par) of the Sylhet City Corporation area in renowned Sylhet Division of Bangladesh. It is about 12 km from the Sylhet Osmani International Airport and 3 km from the Sylhet Railway Station. Maintained and organised by the Bangladesh National Museum, this museum has been established to pay rich tribute to the great hero of Bangladesh for his outstanding accomplishments. This will surely act as a stimulus to the future generations. The foundation stone was laid on 16 February 1985 and it was inaugurated on 4 March 1987 by the then president of Bangladesh H M Ershad.

== See also ==
- List of museums in Bangladesh
- Ahsan Manzil
- Bangladesh Maritime Museum
- Bangladesh Bank Taka Museum
- Bangladesh Military Museum
- Science and technology in Bangladesh
