= Architecture of Dhaka =

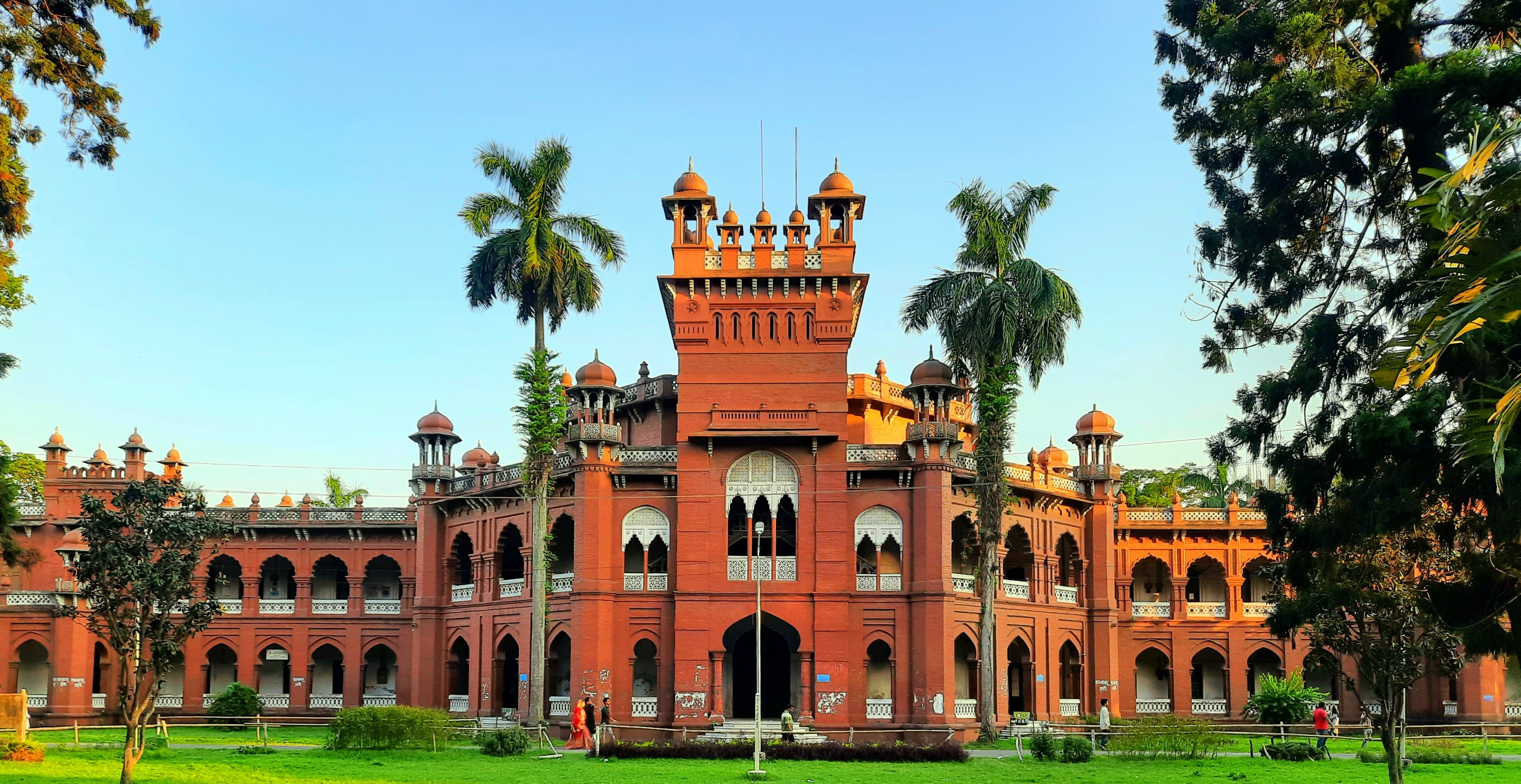
Curzon Hall, part of the University of Dhaka

The architecture of Dhaka is a confluence of many architectural styles. From the Sena temples built by Ballal Sen, to the Mughal architecture of the Mughal Empire, to the Indo-Saracenic style (pioneered in Madras) of the colonial era, to 20th century steel and chrome of skyscrapers. Dhaka has a colonial core in the river port area, surrounded by progressively newer areas as one travels away from the Buriganga, punctuated with old temples, churches and mosques.

== Styles of architecture ==
=== Mughal architecture ===
Mughal architecture, an amalgam of Islamic, Persian and Indian architecture, is the distinctive style developed by the Mughals in the 16th and 17th centuries in what is now India, Pakistan, and Bangladesh. It is symmetrical and decorative in style.

Some of the first and most characteristic examples that remain of early Mughal architecture were built in the short reign (1540–1545) of emperor Sher Shah Suri, who was not a Mughal; they include a mosque known as the Qila-i-Kuhna mosque (1541) at Purana Quila, Delhi, and the military architecture of the Old Fort in Delhi, the Lalbagh Fort in Bangladesh, and Rohtas Fort, near Jhelum in Pakistan. His mausoleum, octagonal in plan and set upon a plinth in the middle of an artificial lake, is in Sasaram, and was completed by his son and successor Islam Shah Suri (1545AD-1553AD).

=== Indo-Saracenic ===
The Indo-Saracenic (also known as Indo-Gothic, Mughal-Gothic, Neo-Mughal, Hindoo or Hindu-Gothic) was an architectural style movement by British architects in the late 19th century in British India. It drew elements from native Indo-Islamic and Indian architecture, and combined it with the Gothic revival and Neo-Classical styles favoured in Victorian Britain. The style gained momentum in the west with the publication of the various views of India by William Hodges and the Daniell duo, (William Daniell and his uncle Thomas Daniell) from about 1795.

=== Lalbagh Fort ===
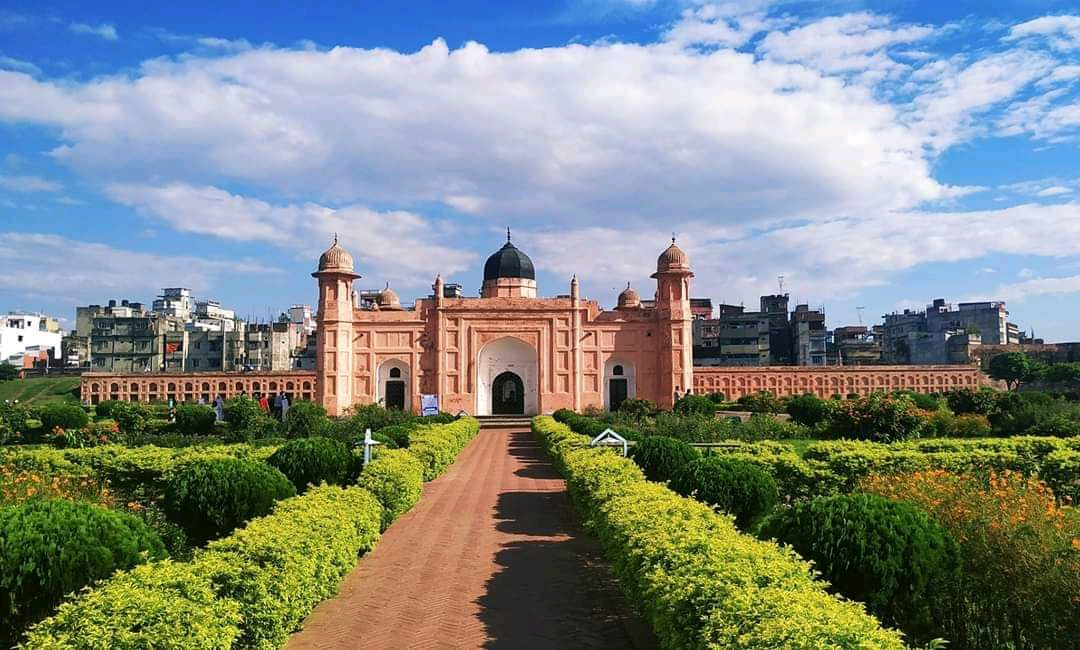
Tomb of Pari Bibi within the Lalbagh Fort

Lalbagh Fort (Bengali: লালবাগ দূর্গ) (also known as "Fort Aurangabad") is an incomplete Mughal palace fortress at the Buriganga River in the southwestern part of Dhaka, Bangladesh. Construction was commenced in 1678 by Prince Muhammad Azam during his 15-month-long vice-royalty of Bengal, but before the work could complete, he was recalled by Aurangzeb. His successor, Shaista Khan, did not complete the work, though he stayed in Dhaka up to 1688. His daughter Iran Dukht nicknamed Pari Bibi (Fairy Lady) died here in 1684 and this led him to consider the fort to be ominous.

=== Ruplal House ===
Ruplal House is a grand 19th century building or mansion in Old Dhaka, Bangladesh. It was initially owned by Dhaka's infamous Armenian landlord Aratun and later bought [1] and erected jointly by two Hindu affluent merchant brothers named Ruplal Das and Raghunath, sons of Swarup Chandra, on the northern bank of Buriganga overlooking a riverfront promenade in the Farashganj district of old Dhaka.

Ruplal House was built on the site at a huge cost, according to the design of an architect of the Martin Company in Calcutta. Divided into two unequal blocks in slightly different styles, it is a two-storey edifice. It presents a Grand River front, about 9144 m long. It replicated Greek Doric column and there used to be a huge clock at the top of the building. In the earthquake of 1897. Its ground plan follows the shape of the letter 'E', with three arms extending towards the north or the city side, of which the middle arm projects about 1830 m. It accommodates a grand portico carried on a series of lofty semi-Corinthian fluted columns, and surmounted by a triangular pediment, characteristic of Renaissance architecture.

The two blocks include, in two floors, over fifty rooms of various sizes and of them the central hall on the upper floor of the more impressive western wing was an elegantly decorated dance hall with a wooden floor. On the north and south two broad verandas run the entire length of the block and are supported on either round semi-Corinthian columns or rectangular brick pillars with segmented or trefoil arches above.

=== Bara Katra ===
The Bara Katra (Bengali: বড় কাটরা) is a historical and architectural monument located in the city of Dhaka, Bangladesh. It is a palatial building dating to the reign of the Mughal dynasty in the Bengal region. It is situated to the south of Chawk Bazar close to the north bank of the river Buriganga.

=== Curzon Hall ===
Curzon Hall is part of the school of science of the University of Dhaka. With its significance in education during the post independence era of Bangladesh as well as afterwards, it has become an emblem of educational tradition of the country.

=== Ahsan Manzil ===
Ahsan Manzil (Bengali: আহসান মঞ্জিল) was the official residential palace and seat of the Dhaka Nawab Family. This magnificent building is situated at Kumartoli along the banks of the Buriganga River in Bangladesh. The construction of this palace was started in the year 1859 and was completed in 1869. It is constructed in the Indo-Saracenic Revival architecture. To preserve the cultural and history of the area, the palace became the Bangladesh National Museum on 20 September 1992.

=== Star Mosque ===
Star Mosque, locally known as Tara Masjid (Bengali: তারা মসজিদ), is a mosque located in Dhaka, Bangladesh. It is situated at the Armanitola area of the old part of the city. The mosque has ornate designs and is decorated with motifs of blue stars. It was built in the first half of the 19th century by one Mirza Golam Pir (Mirza Ahmed Jan).
