= Boat Museum, Kolkata =

Museum in Kolkata, India

- Established: January 2014
- Location: Ambedkar Bhawan, Cultural Research Institute, Kankurgachi, Kolkata, West Bengal 700054
- Coordinates: 22.582°N 88.391°E
- Type: Ethnographic museum
- Owner: Government of West Bengal
- Website: www.criwb.in

Boat Museum is a public museum dedicated to the history of boats in the Bengal region. Located in the Institute of Cultural Research in Kankurgachi, Kolkata, it is India's first museum dedicated to understanding boats, indigenous boat-making, and their heritage. Adjacent to the Boat Museum is the Puppet Museum, Kantha Museum, and a collection of tribal artifacts.

Other similar establishments include the Kolkata Port Trust Maritime Archives and Heritage Centre, located on Strand Road, Kolkata.

== History ==
The Bengal region is known as the land of two rivers, situated on the Ganges-Brahmaputra Delta. This delta is formed by the confluence of the river Ganges, also referred to as the Padma River in Bangladesh, and the Brahmaputra River. These two rivers, alongside their innumerable tributaries, flow through the Bengal region, shaping its geographic landscape and contributing to its agricultural productivity. The abundant water supply from these rivers has made the Bengal region a prominent agricultural and cultural hub in South Asia. Therefore, different kinds of boats have historically performed an important role in the region’s various rivers. For instance, dholai is a cargo boat used in the Sunderban region, whereas salti is a traditional fishing boat better suited for fishing in the wetlands of East Kolkata. Boats and their structure vary radically since the ones in Northern Bengal would not be suitable for the river conditions in Eastern or Southern Bengal.

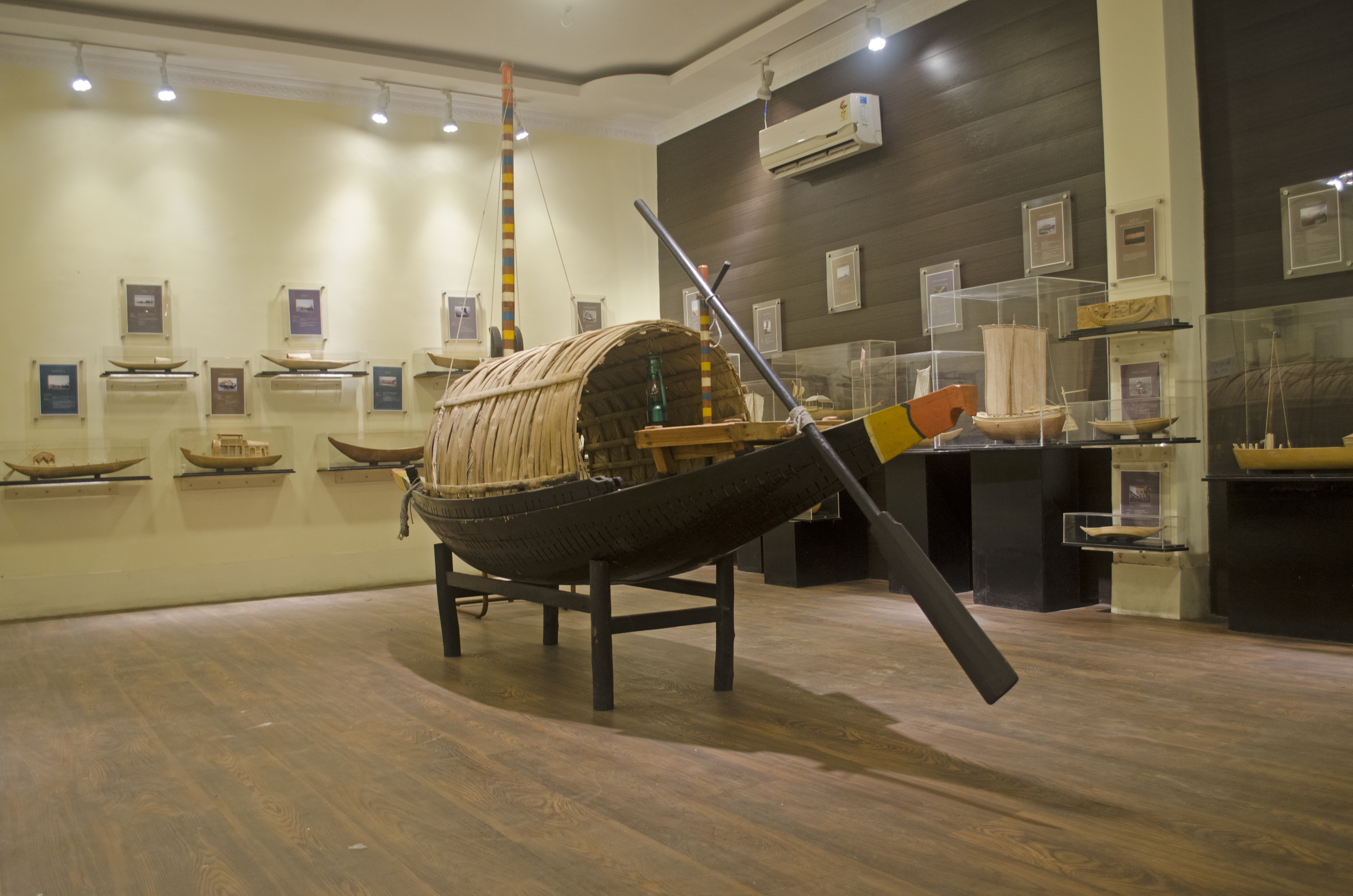
Inside the Boat Museum

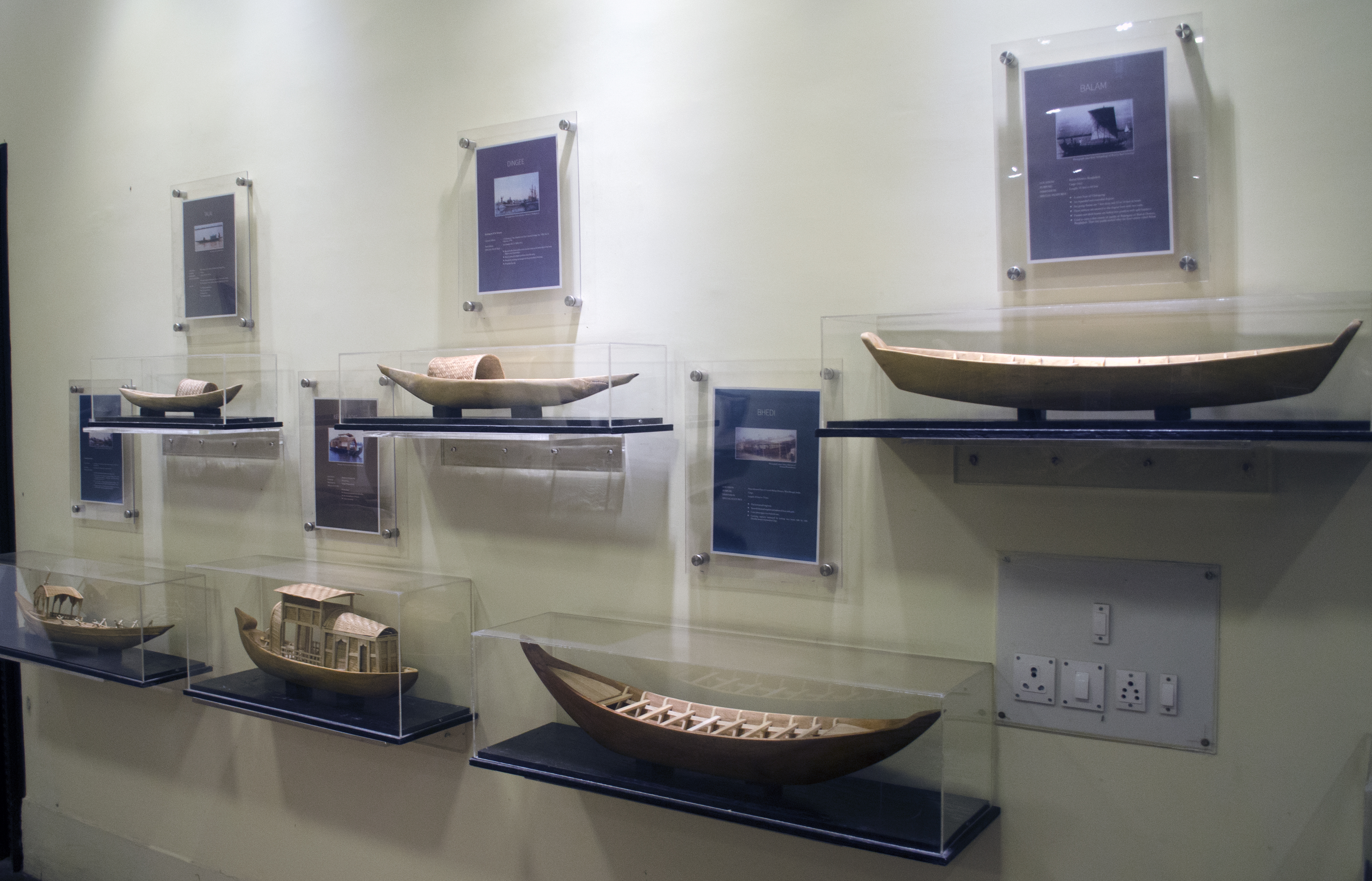
Models of boats displayed at Boat Museum

According to Swarup Bhattacharyya, an anthropology researcher and one of the minds behind facilitating the exhibits at the Boat Museum, “boat-making as a craft is passed on through the guru-shishya tradition." Given there does not exist any formally educated community of boat-makers, with the emergence of more industrialised and mechanised fishing equipment, indigenous boat-makers much like the boats started to disappear and soon came to represent a bygone era. It is to preserve the memories of what Bengal used to be, and to illustrate its rich riverine heritage, the Boat Museum was established in 2014. It was inaugurated byUpendranath Biswas, formerly the joint director of the Central Bureau of Investigation and the former minister for backward class welfare in the West Bengal government.

== Collections ==
Boat Museum houses forty-six wooden replicas of boats that depicts Bengal's boat heritage. From cargo boats of Sunderbans, coastal fishing boats, and popular flat-bottomed boats of Northern Bengal to all-purpose boats known as dinghi have been featured in the museum. The museum also exhibits a replica of the poet Rabindranath Tagore's boat Padma and a replica of a boat from the Mohenjo-daro era.

Since boat-making is a tradition passed on from generation to generation, typically performed by communities that have become marginalised now, all the boat model exhibits presented in the museum have been made by the Rajbangshis of South Dinajpur district to highlight traditional craftsmanship.

== See also ==
- Bangladesh Maritime Museum
- Bangladesh National Museum
- Victoria Memorial
- Indian Museum
