= Bibi Khanum =

For centuries, both Bibi and Khanum have been used as honorific titles for women across many regions.

Bibi Khanum may refer to:

== People ==
- Saray Mulk Khanum (c. 1341 – 1408), empress consort of the Timurid Empire
- Bibi Khanoom Astarabadi (1858/9 – 1921), Iranian writer and satirist

== Architecture ==
- Bibi-Khanym Mosque, a large mosque in Samarkand, Uzbekistan
