= Bibi (title) =

South Asian honorific title

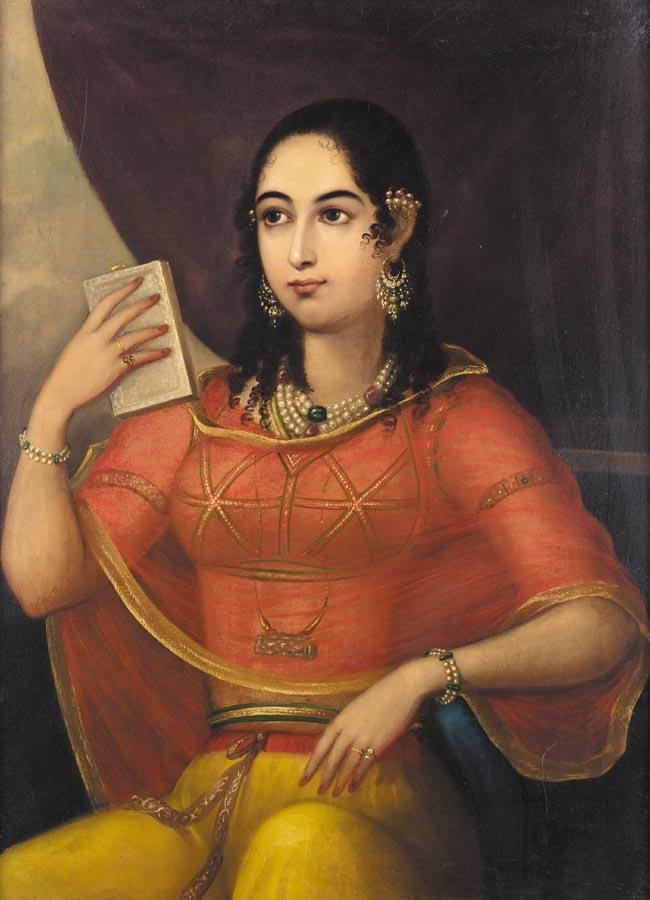
Portrait of a Bibi, Lucknow (Oudh State) 1785

Bibi (pronounced [ˈbiːbiː]) is frequently used as a respectful title for Muslim, Christian and Sikh women in South Asia when added to the given name.

Bibi, like Begum, is used as a surname by many women in the region.

In Anglo-Indian, the term bibi came to be seen as a synonym for mistress.

== Etymology ==
The word "Bibi", which made its way into the Pashto and Urdu language, was originally borrowed from Classical Persian (بی‌بی bī-bī). It was translated as "grandma" (chiefly in Pashto, Dari, Tajik). Besides this it was also used as respectful title to address senior women.

== Notable people known by this title ==
- Aisha Bibi, 12th-century noble woman, after whom a memorial and village are named in modern Kazakhstan
- Bibi Mubarika, a 16th century Yusufzai Pashtun Empress consort in the Mughal Empire. She was a wife of the first Mughal emperor Babur.
- Bibi Ambha, the Hindu origin mother of Sikandar Lodi
- Asia Bibi, a Catholic Christian worker accused of blasphemy in Pakistan
- Bushra Bibi, wife of Imran Khan and First Lady of Pakistan
- Sultana Chand Bibi (1550–1599 CE), also known as Chand Khatun or Chand Sultana, Indian Muslim woman warrior
- Islam Bibi (1974–2013), Afghan policewoman and human rights activist
- Noorjahan Kakon Bibi, female freedom fighter in Bangladesh
- Mukhtaran Bibi (born c. 1972, now known as Mukhtār Mā'ī), human rights activist
- Pari Bibi, noblewoman of the Mughal Empire buried in Lalbagh Fort, Dhaka
- Taramon Bibi, female freedom fighter in Bangladesh
- Taj Bibi, empress consort of Emperor Jahangir and mother of Emperor Shah Jahan

== See also ==
- Baba (honorific) - inverse
