= Azizul Islam =

Bangladeshi flutist

Azizul Islam আজিজুল ইসলাম
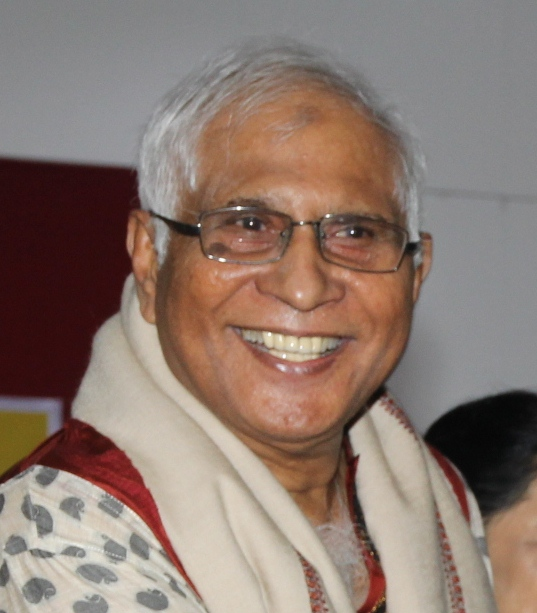
- Islam in 2017

Background information
- Born: 2 May 1944 (age 81); Rajbari District, Bengal Province, British India
- Instrument: flute
- Website: ustadazizulislam.com

Azizul Islam (born 2 May 1944) is a Bangladeshi flutist. He was awarded Ekushey Padak by the Government of Bangladesh in the music category in 2017.

== Early life ==
Islam studied in Government Muslim High School Chittagong and Chittagong College. He then graduated from Bangladesh Marine Academy. He became a captain of a merchant vessel. He was trained under Ranjan Sengupta and Vilayat Ali Khan.

== Career ==
Islam left the marine job in 1973. He became a student of the Indian sarod player Ustad Bahadur Khan to acquire the knowledge of the performing style of Seni Gharana. Then he received lessons from the flutists Devendra Murdeshwar and VG Karnad, both disciples of Pannalal Ghosh.

== Awards ==
- Sangeet Piyasi Award
- Paul Harris Fellow Award
- Sahitya Academy Award
- Ekushey Padak (2017)
