= Lalbagh Fort =

Historical site in Dhaka, Bangladesh

- লালবাগের কেল্লা
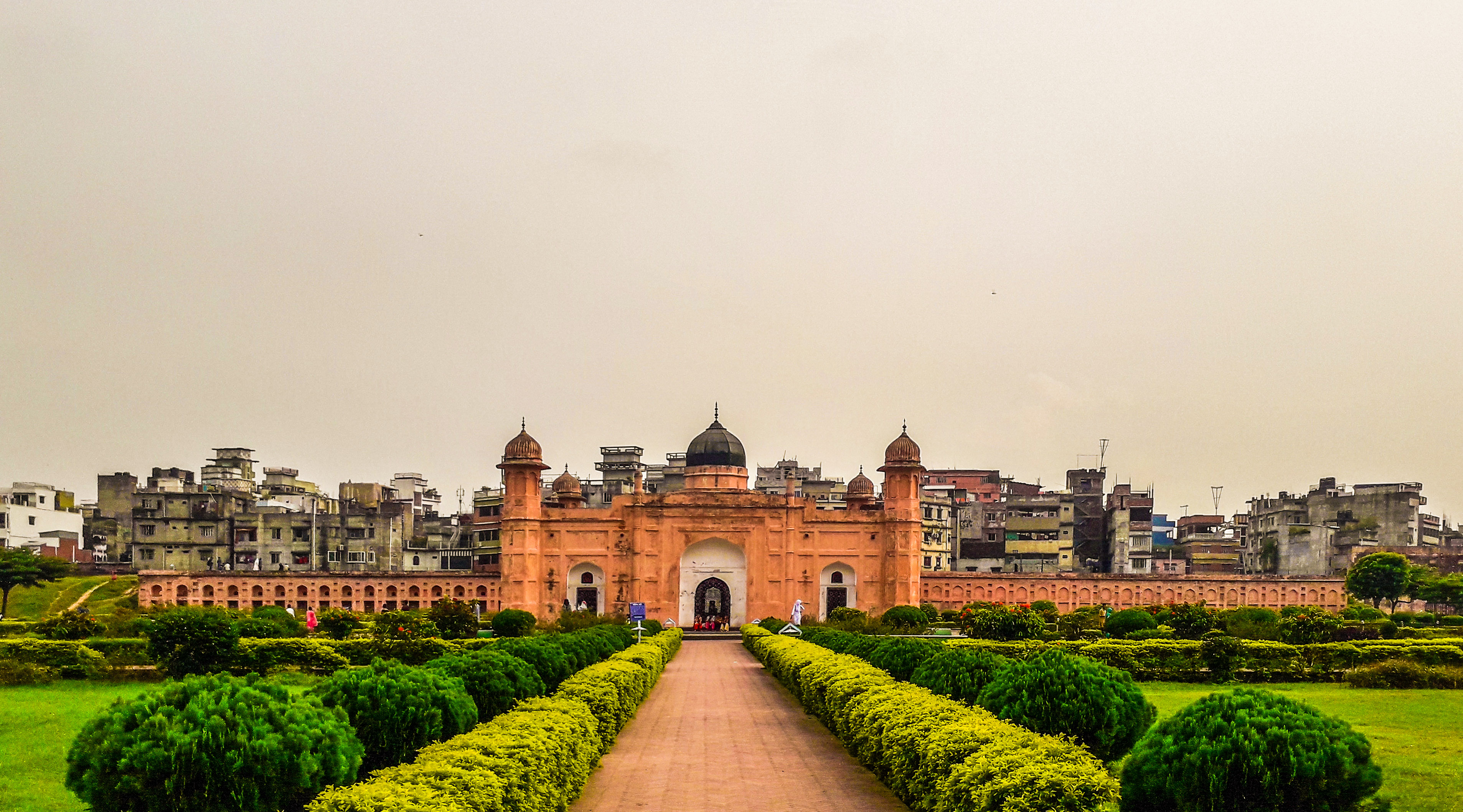
- Façade of the tomb of Pari Bibi in the Lalbagh Fort
- Interactive map of Lalbagh Fort
- 23.7190°N 90.3881°E
- Location: Dhaka, Bangladesh

History
- Founder: Muhammad Azam Shah
- Built: 1678; 348 years ago

Site notes
- Architectural style: Mughal architecture
- List of Old Dhaka Heritage Sites

The Lalbagh Fort (Bengali: লালবাগ কেল্লা, romanized: Lālbāg Kēllā) is a historic fort situated in the old city of Dhaka, Bangladesh. Its name is derived from its neighbourhood, Lalbagh, which means Red Garden. The term Lalbagh refers to reddish and pinkish hues in the Mughal architecture. The original fort was called Fort Aurangabad. Its construction was started by Prince Muhammad Azam Shah, a son of the Emperor Aurangzeb, and briefly a future Mughal emperor himself. After the prince was recalled by his father, the fort's construction was overseen by Shaista Khan, the Subahdar of Mughal Bengal. The death of Shaista Khan's daughter, Pari Bibi (Fairy Lady), resulted in a halt to the construction process, apparently due to Shaista Khan's superstition that the fort brought bad omen. Pari Bibi was buried inside the fort.

Lalbagh Fort was built as the residence of the governor of the Mughal province of Bengal. The complex includes the governor's house, the tomb of Pari Bibi and a mosque. It is covered by lawns, fountains and water channels. Its two south gates were previously grand arches. The original grand complex covered the governor's house and the two archways. The tomb of Pari Bibi was later added. Lalbagh Fort was modelled as a miniature version of great Mughal forts like the Red Fort and Fatehpur Sikri. During the reign of Emperor Aurangzeb, Bengal became the economic engine of the empire, and Aurangzeb called it the Paradise of Nations. Dhaka grew into an imperial city with one of the richest elites in the Mughal Empire, including members of the imperial family. Mughal artillery guarded the fort. Once located beside the Buriganga River, the river has retreated from the vicinity of the fort. The fort was depicted in European paintings during the 18th and 19th centuries.

Today, Lalbagh Fort is one of the most visited sites in Dhaka. Several pieces of artillery are kept inside the fort. The Ambassadors Fund for Cultural Preservation is funding a restoration project for parts of the fort. Lalbagh Fort is one of the most recognized symbols of Mughal rule in Bengal.

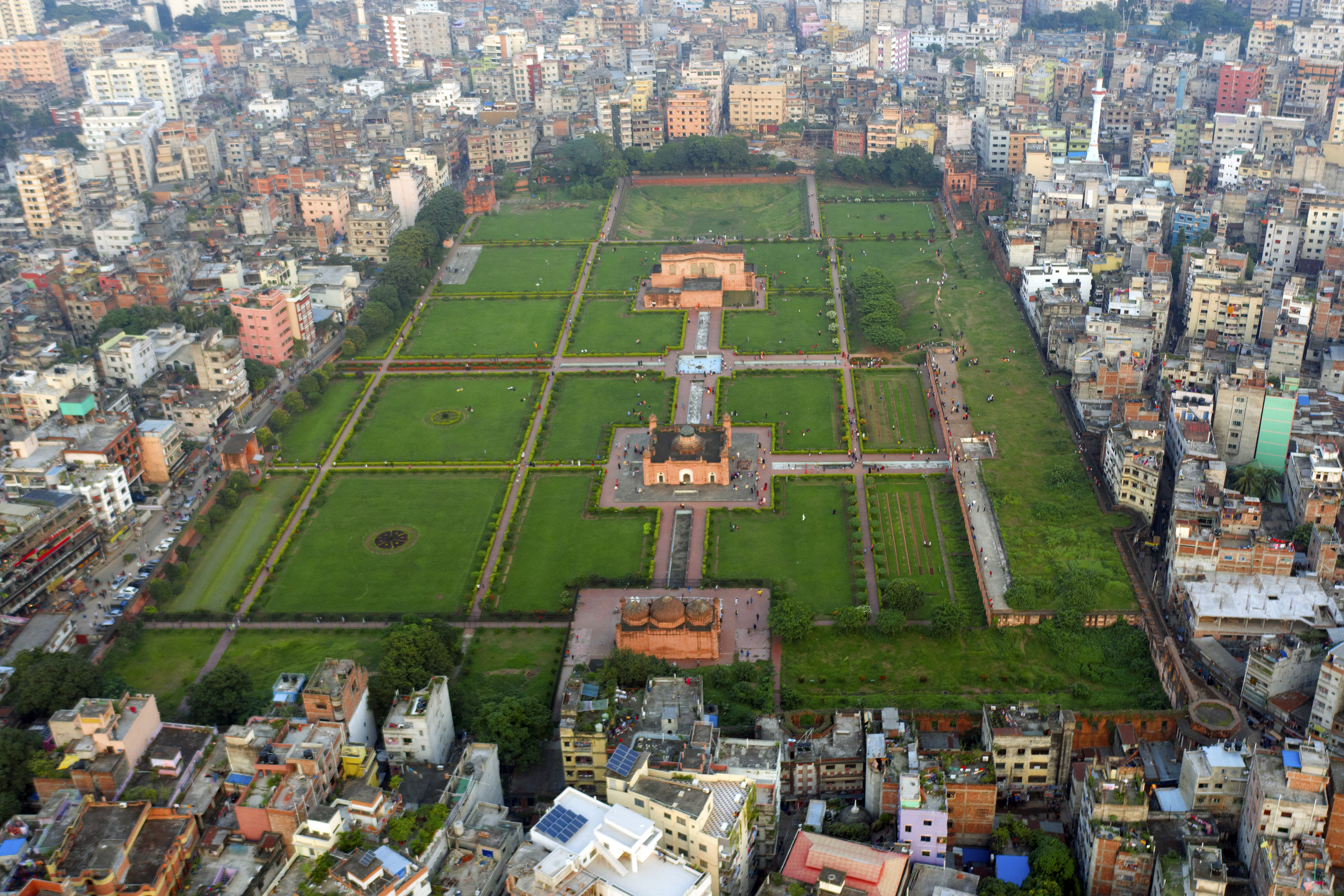
An aerial view of Lalbagh Fort

== History ==
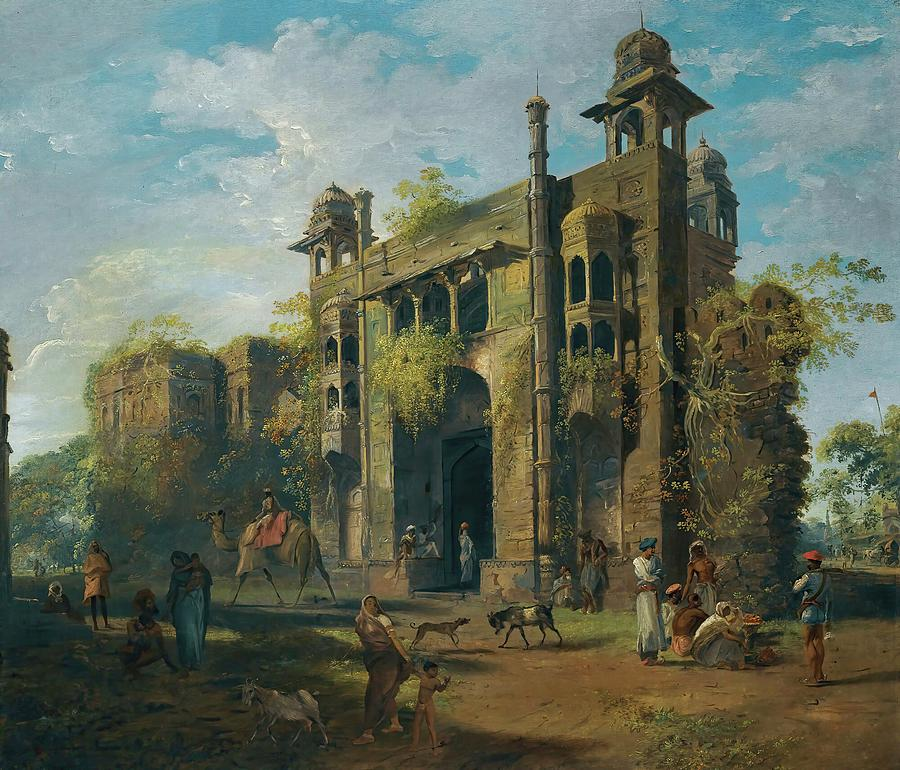
South gate of the fort painted by Johan Zoffany in 1787

The Mughal prince Muhammad Azam Shah, third son of Aurangzeb, started the work of the fort in 1678 during his vice-royalty in Bengal. He stayed in Bengal for 15 months. The fort remained incomplete when he was called away by his father, Aurangzeb.

Shaista Khan was the new subahdar of Dhaka at that time, and he did not complete the fort. In 1684, the daughter of Shaista Khan, named Iran Dukht Pari Bibi, died there. After her death, he started to think of the fort as unlucky and left the structure incomplete. Among the three major parts of Lalbagh Fort, one is the tomb of Pari Bibi.

After Shaista Khan left Dhaka, it lost its popularity. The main cause was that the capital was moved from Dhaka to Murshidabad. After the end of the royal Mughal period, the fort became abandoned. In 1844, the area acquired its name as Lalbagh, replacing Aurangabad, and the fort became Lalbagh Fort.

== Architecture ==
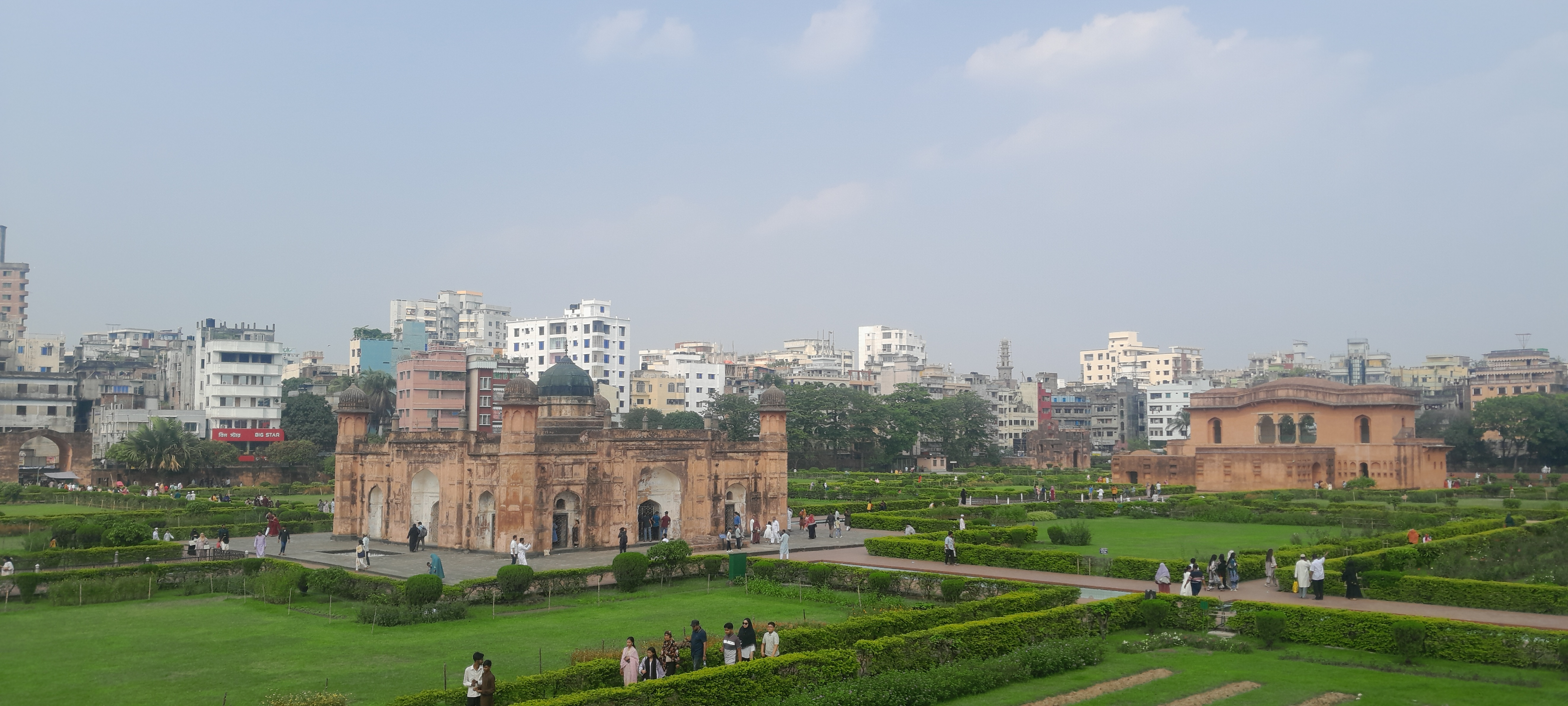
Lalbagh Fort from an adjacent hill

For a long time, the fort was considered to be a combination of three buildings (the mosque, the tomb of Bibi Pari and the Diwan-i-Aam), with two gateways and a portion of the partly damaged fortification wall. Recent excavations carried out by the Department of Archaeology of Bangladesh have revealed the existence of other structures.

The southern fortification wall has a huge bastion in the southwestern corner. On the north of the south fortification wall were the utility buildings, stable, administration block, and its western part accommodated a beautiful roof-garden with arrangements for fountains and a water reservoir. The residential part was located on the east of the west fortification wall, mainly to the southwest of the mosque.

The fortification wall on the south had five bastions at regular intervals two stories in height, and the western wall had two bastions; the biggest one is near the main southern gate. The bastions had a tunnel.

The central area of the fort is occupied by three buildings—the Diwan-i-Aam and the hammam on its east, the mosque on the west and the Tomb of Pari Bibi in between the two—in one line, but not at an equal distance. A water channel with fountains at regular intervals connects the three buildings from east to west and north to south.

=== Diwan-i-Aam ===
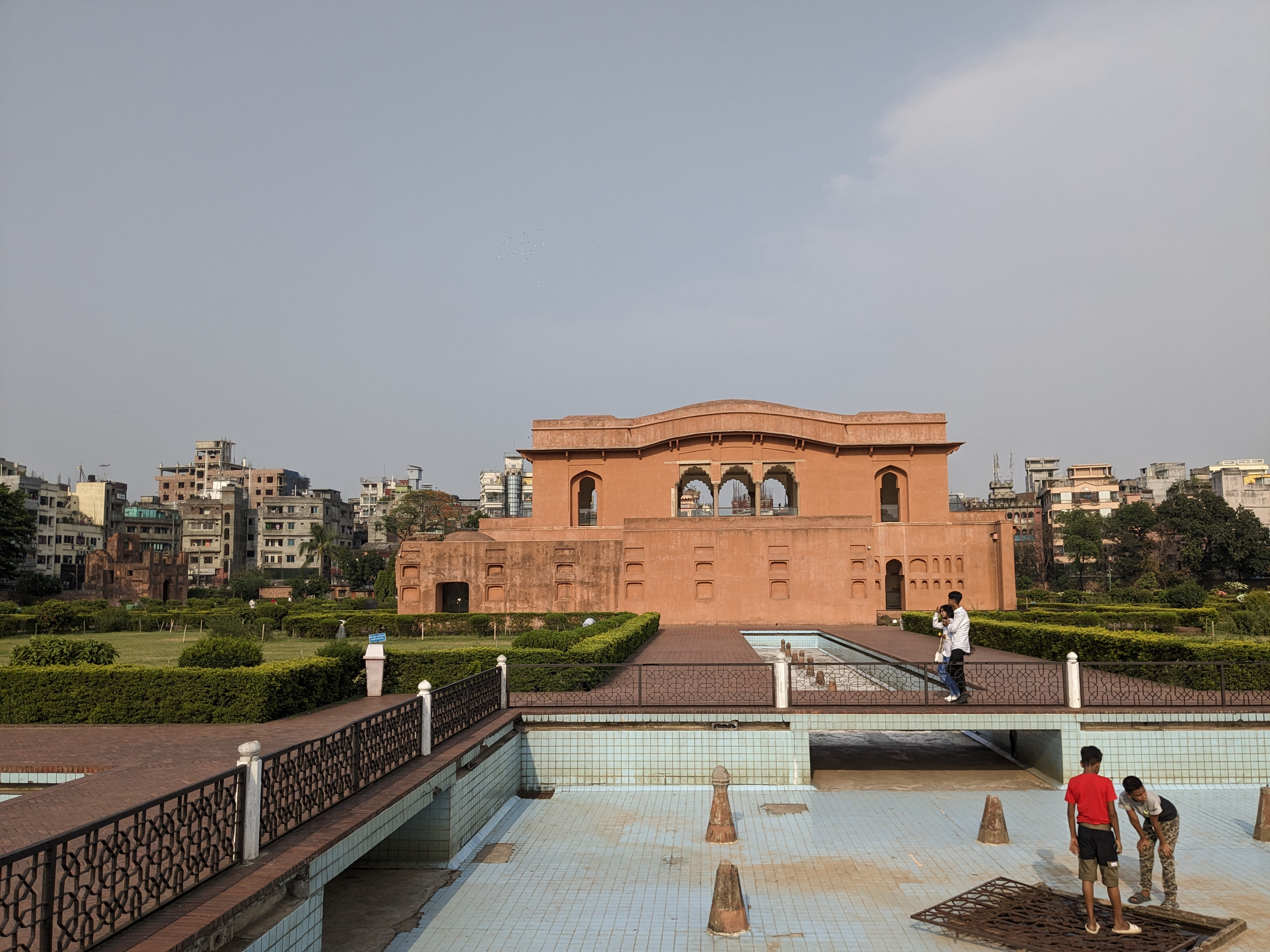
The Mughal governor's residence (Diwan-i-Aam) and its attached hammam

Diwan-i-Aam is a two-story residence of the Mughal governor of Bengal located on the east side of the complex. A single-story hammam is attached to its west. The hammam portion has an underground room for boiling water. A long partition wall runs along the western facade of the hammam.

The building is situated about 39 metres (128 ft) to the west of the tank, running from north to south. The external measurements of the building are 32.47 by 8.18 m (107 by 27 ft).

There are living quarters on each level of two stories and a main central hallway connecting them. There is a Hammamkhana (bathhouse) in the southern part of the building, which is one of the seven Hammamkhana still existing in ruins in the heritage of Bangladesh.

Recent excavations (1994–2009) show that there was a special room below the room of Hammamkhana, where archaeologists found the arrangements for heating water, supplying the hot water as well as cool water to the Hammamkhana through the terracotta pipes which were specially manufactured for such purpose. The discovery of black spots in the underground room proved that fire had been used for the purpose of heating the water for the Hammamkhana. There was also a toilet room by the side of Hammamkhana.

All the buildings along with the arrangements of Hammamkhana clearly show that it was very much in use by the Subadar of Bengal and that Subadar was Shaista Khan. From the report of the Governor of English Factory, it was learned that Shaista Khan used to live in this room and some Europeans were kept in custody here.

=== A water tank ===
A square-shaped water tank (71.63 m (235 ft) on each side) is placed to the east of the Diwan-i-Aam. There are four corner stairs to descend into the tank.

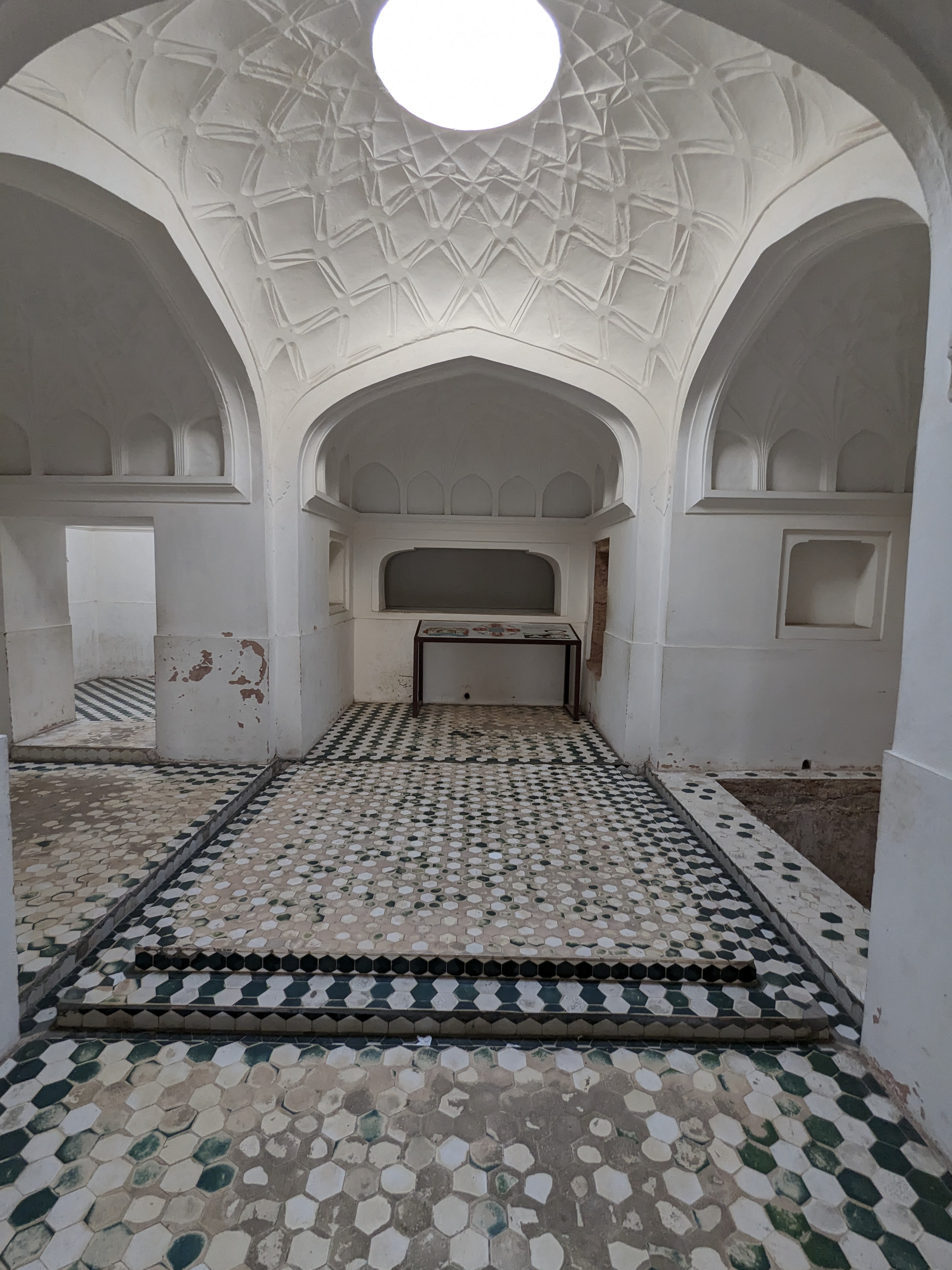
Hammamkhana of Lalbagh Fort

=== Tomb of Bibi Pari ===
The tomb of Bibi Pari, the daughter of Shaista Khan, is in the middle of the complex. There is a central square room. It contains the remains of Pori Bibi, covered by a false octagonal dome and wrapped by a brass plate. The entire inner wall is covered with white marble. Eight rooms surround the central one. There is another small grave in the southeastern corner room.

=== Lalbagh Fort Mosque ===
The mosque has three domes and is relatively small for a large site, with a water tank for ablutions in front. The mosque has an oblong plan of 20.34 m × 10.21 m (66 ft 9 in × 33 ft 6 in) externally and 16.36 m × 6.15 m (53 ft 8 in × 20 ft 2 in) internally.

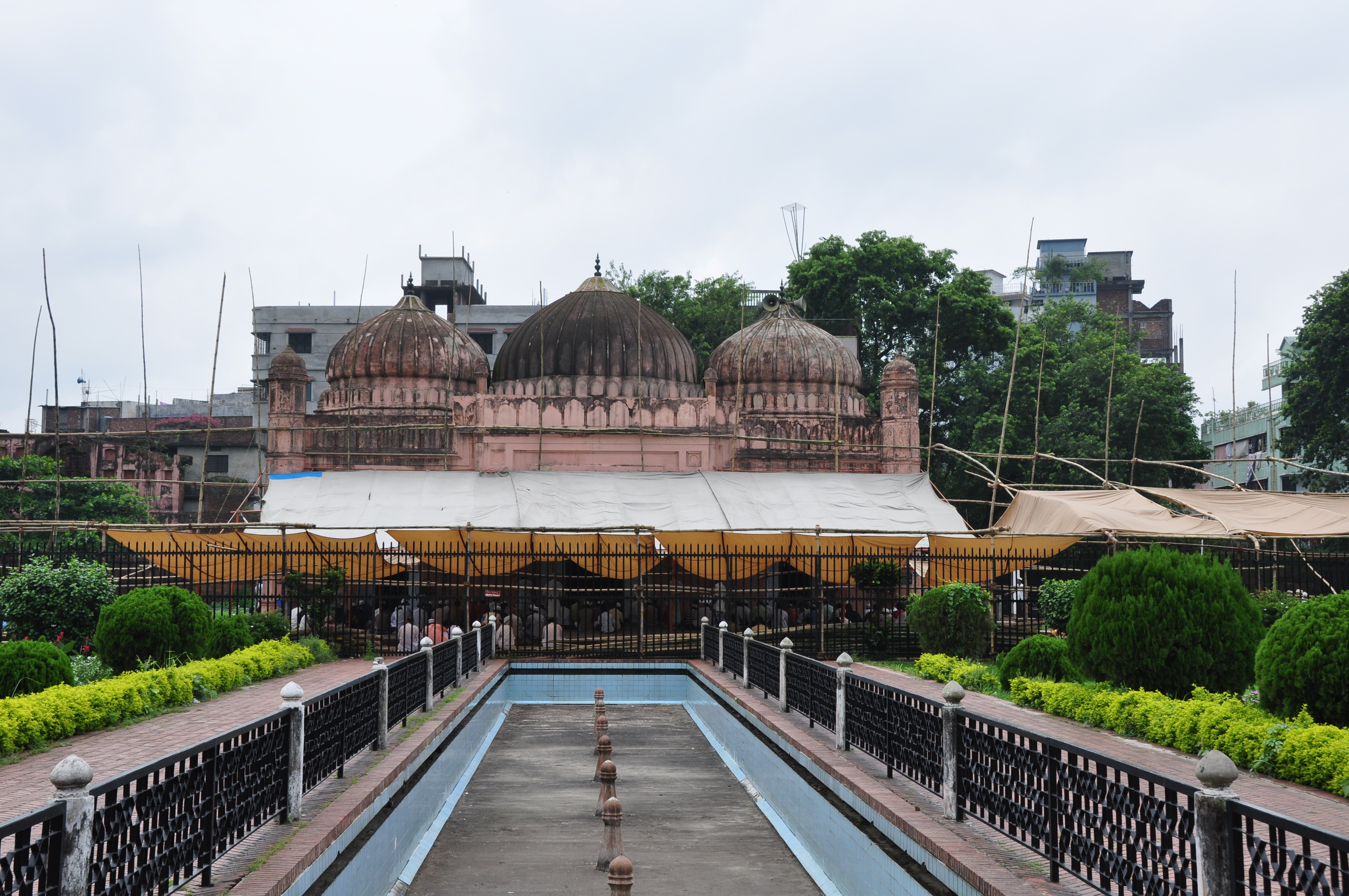
Mosque

== Stories ==
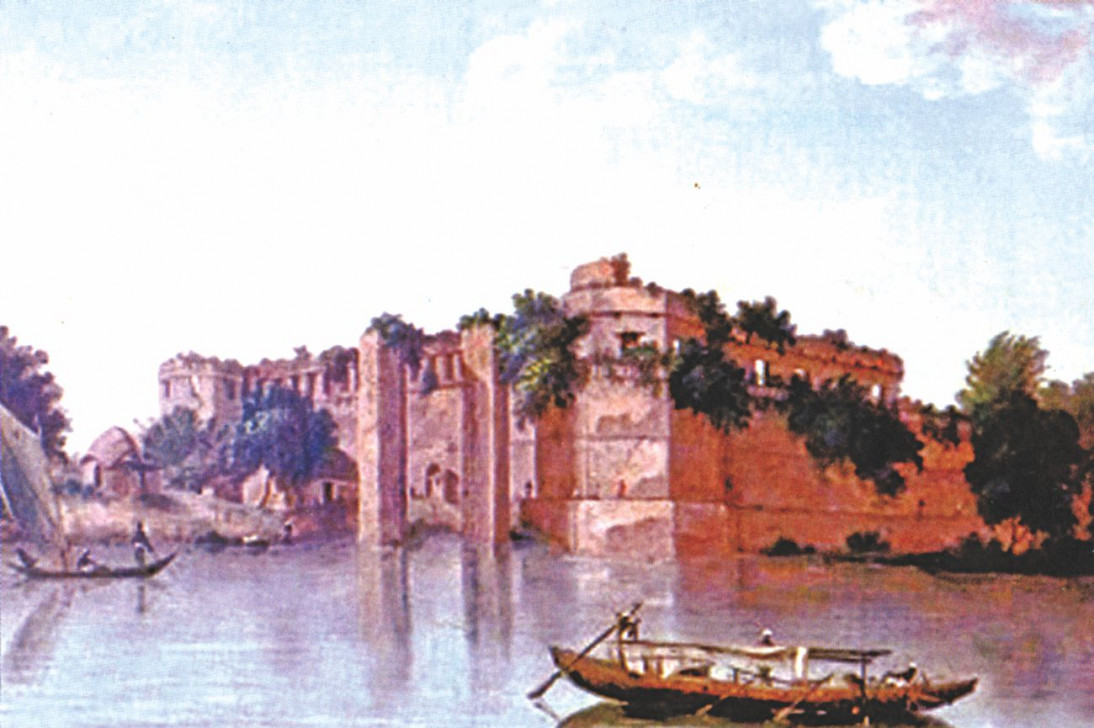
View from the Buriganga River in 1799. Painting by Robert Home

From the time of construction till date, various myths have revolved around the fort. Among all the historical stories and debates, it is widely believed that Lalbagh Fort stands as a monument of the unfulfilled dreams of Prince Muhammad Azam Shah, beloved son of Emperor Aurangzeb. In the mid-17th century, he was serving as the Viceroy of Bengal and began the construction of the impressive Lalbagh Fort complex.

Therefore, the popular stories about the fort begin. Before the construction was finished, Prince Azam was called back to his father to assist in the war against the Marathas. Legend says after the Mughal prince departed, Shaista Khan continued with building the project, but upon the untimely death of his much-loved daughter Iran-Dukht, warmly known as Pari Bibi, the construction was stopped. Bibi was engaged to Prince Azam at the time of her death.

There are also legends and debates about the identity of Pari Bibi. Few researchers claim she was a nine-year-old Ahom princess. Mir Jumals Ahom's expedition brought a war adjoining the Garo hills. He took the daughter of Ahom Raja to compel him to execute the previous peace treaty. Later, the emperor made her convert to Islam and married her off to Prince Azam. However, overshadowing all the debates, people now believe that she was the loving daughter of Nawab Shaista Khan.

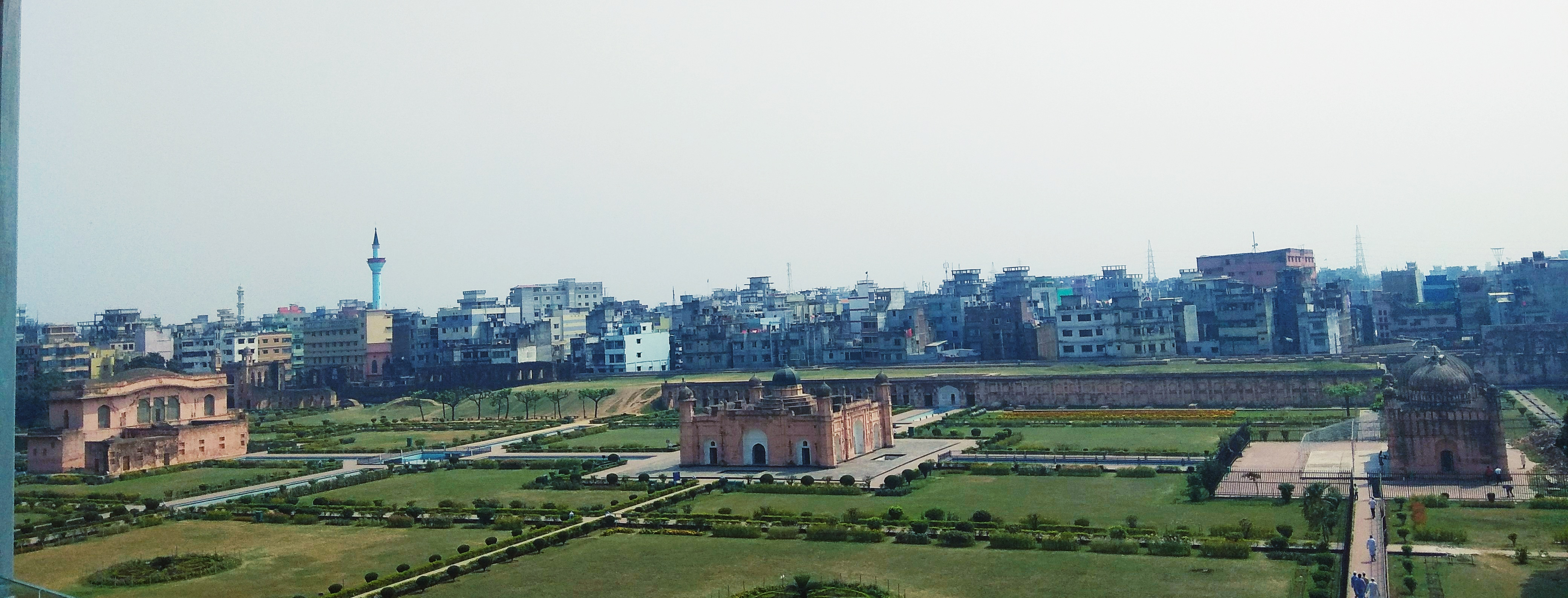

== Research ==
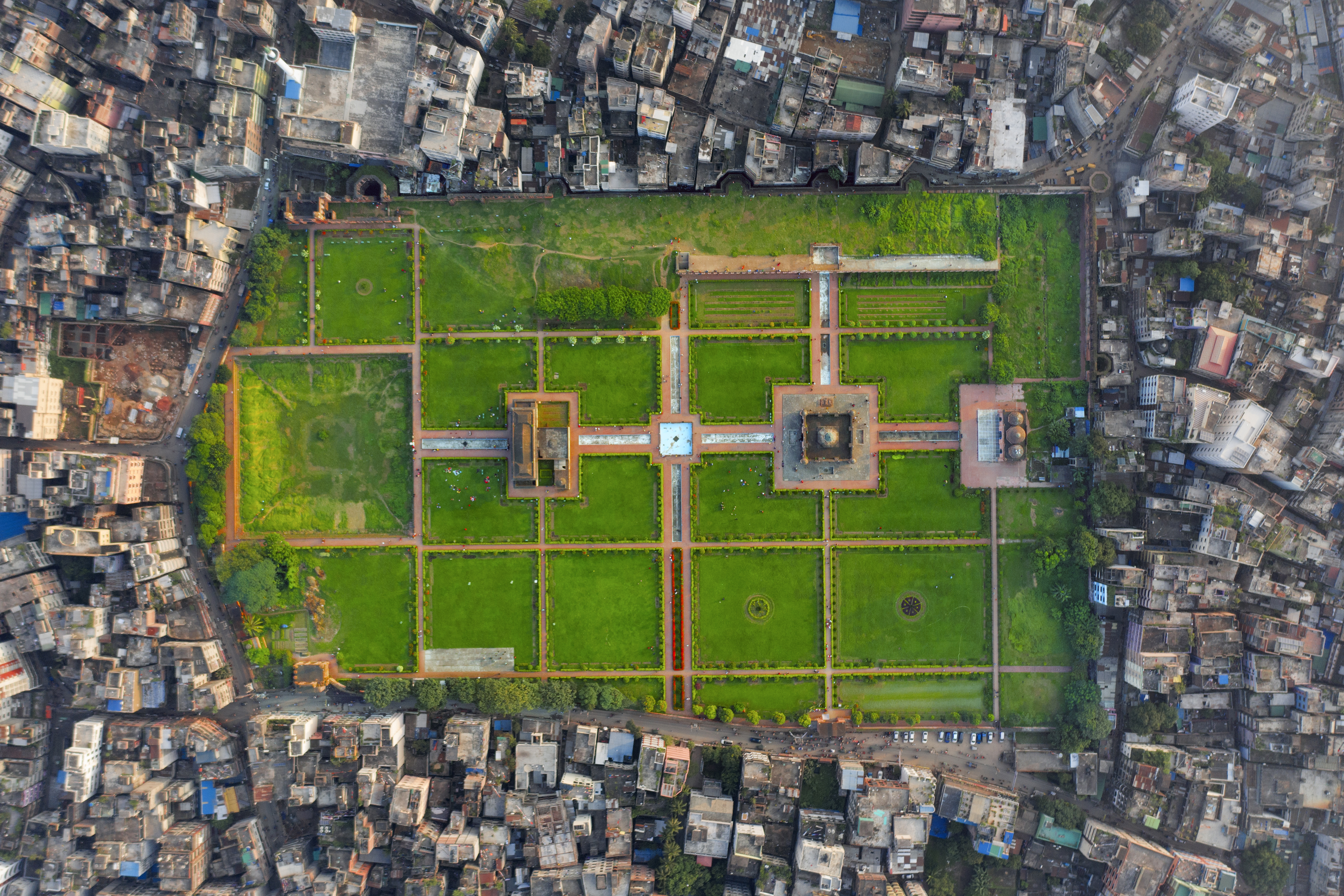
Aerial view of Lalbagh Fort

Archeologists discovered the continuity of the main fort walls eastward below Shaishta Khan Road. They opined that the present area of Qilla represents half the portion as planned by Prince Azam Khan. The gate at the southeast of the fort (adjacent to Lalbagh Shahi Masjid) as per requirement fits properly as the Central Gate in the middle of Fort. The other half to the east—likely planned for administrative purposes (Girde Qilla area)—were incomplete or extinct long ago.

There are some tunnels in the fort which are now sealed. It is said that two of the tunnels lead to now ruined Zinzira Fort which was on the other side of the Buriganga River. Another passage was made as a maze. It is claimed that many defeated sepoys (soldiers) of the Sepoy Revolution of 1857 tried to run away through the passage and lost their lives. The British soldiers who chased them to arrest also did not return. To investigate the claim, British researchers sent an elephant and dogs to the tunnel but they did not return either. After that, the tunnels were sealed.

== See also ==
- List of museums in Bangladesh
- Ahsan Manzil
- Bangladesh Maritime Museum
- Bangladesh Bank Taka Museum
- Bangladesh Military Museum
- History of Dhaka
- List of archaeological sites in Bangladesh
- List of mosques in Bangladesh
- Baitul Mukarram
- Pathrail Masjid
