= Bangladesh Marine Academy =

Maritime college in Bangladesh

- বাংলাদেশ মেরিন একাডেমি
- Other name: BMA
- Former name: Mercantile Marine Academy
- Motto: It is Allah who has subjected sea to us
- Type: Government
- Established: 1962
- Affiliations: Bangladesh Maritime University; Ministry of Shipping
- Commandant: Captain Kazi ABM Shameem
- Location: Chattogram, Chittagong, Bangladesh; 22.2426°N 91.8391°E
- Colors
- Website: http://macademy.gov.bd

Bangladesh Marine Academy is a regimental maritime training academy for the officer cadets of merchant navy, located in Chittagong, Bangladesh. After 2 years of academic training and 1 year of onboard training in ship as a trainee officer, they become merchant marine officer of national ships of Bangladesh and international ships.

== History ==
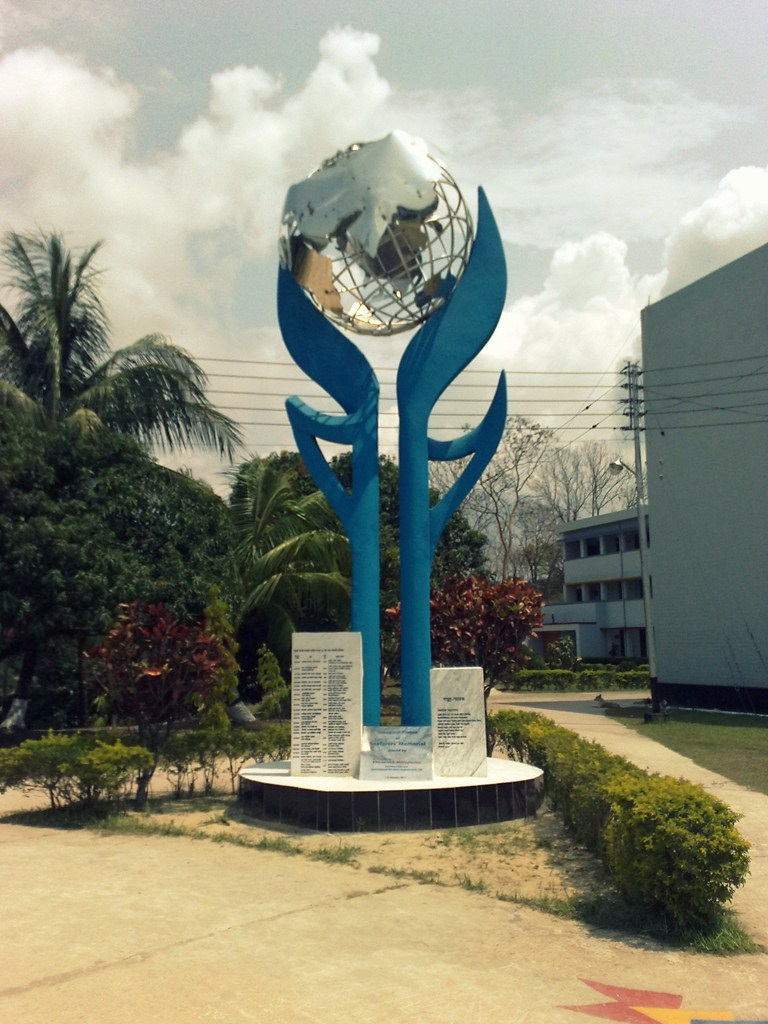
Seafarers' Memorial located at the center of Bangladesh Marine Academy Campus

The world was rapidly changing after WWII (1939–45). West Pakistan along with East Bengal (Bangladesh) became independent from British rule in 1947. The Pakistan Government at the time looked into developing industrial training facilities. A scheme for establishing a marine academy beside the Bay of Bengal was sanctioned in 1952. Juldia Point (valleys of Juldia-Rangadia) at the Karnaphuly river-mouth at Bay of Bengal was chosen for the planned academy due to its 'ship-like environment'. The geographic location of this facility was unique in the country and was not available to other Suez to South-East Asian countries. (Project Plan – Development of Marine Academy, Phase – II [1973-1980])

The construction of basic infrastructure commenced. Its initial budget was Taka 31.19 lakhs in 1952, which increased to Taka 53 lakhs in 1959 and to Taka 58.3 lakhs in 1961. The initial project was completed with the objective of training 22 Nautical Cadet Officers and 22 Marine Engineering Cadet Officers. The new-built 'Mercantile Marine Academy' began on 3 September 1962.

During the Great Liberation War in 1971, the then Pakistan Government shifted the academy's function to Karachi, abandoning this academy. Immediately after the war, Bangabandhu Sheikh Mujibur Rahman resumed it as a Marine Academy with appointing Capt. (Merchant Marine) M L Rahman as its Commandant (first Bangladeshi Commandant). Bangabandhu began a project titled "Development of Marine Academy (1973-1980)" to raise the academy at the forefront of maritime professional excellence in South Asia.

The Bangladesh Government has recently established four more Marine Academies in Barisal, Pabna, Sylhet and Rangpur of Bangladesh which commenced in 2021.

== Courses ==
=== BSc courses ===
- BSc in Nautical Science

4 year Bachelor of Maritime Science

1. Pre-Sea Nautical Science:24 months at Academy (1-4 semester)
2. On Board Training: 12 months sea-service (5-6 semester)
3. 1 year in academy (7-8 semester)
- BSc in Marine Engineering

4 years Bachelor of Marine Engineering

1. Pre-Sea Marine Engineering:24 months at Academy (1-4 semester)
2. On-Board Training: 12 months sea service (5-6 semester)
3. 1 year in academy under (7–8 semester)

=== Preparatory courses ===
- Preparatory Course for Deck Officer Class I (Orals)
- Preparatory Course for Deck Officer Class II & I
- Preparatory Course for Deck Officer Class III
- Preparatory Course for Deck Officer Class IV (Orals)
- Preparatory Course for Deck Officer Class IV & V

=== IMO model courses ===
- Personal Survival Techniques (PST)
- Elementary First Aid (EFA)
- Fire Prevention & Fire Fighting (FP&FF)
- Personal Safety & Social Responsibilities (PSSR)
- Proficiency in Survival Craft &Rescue Boats (PSC&RB)
- Advanced Fire Fighting (AFF)
- Global Maritime Distress & Safety System (GMDSS)
- Standard Swimming Test (SST)
- Radar and ARPA
- Training for Trainer

== Campus ==
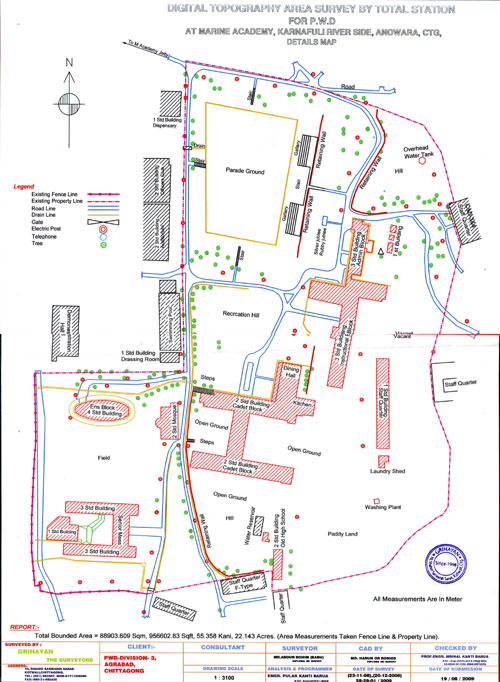
Campus map, Bangladesh Marine Academy

The campus area is 100 acres. The campus includes:

- Two jetties at both side of river Karnaphuly.
- Parade ground, football grounds, basketball grounds, volleyball grounds.
- Cadet Block and post-sea block, Commandant's house, Instructors' houses
- Separate dining hall for cadets and instructors.
- Admin block, Instructional block, Eletro-navigational block, Workshop, auditorium
- Marine Academy primary School, Marine academy School and College
- Swimming pool, lake, recreation hill.
- Bangladesh Maritime Museum, Seafarers' Memorial

== Academic facilities ==
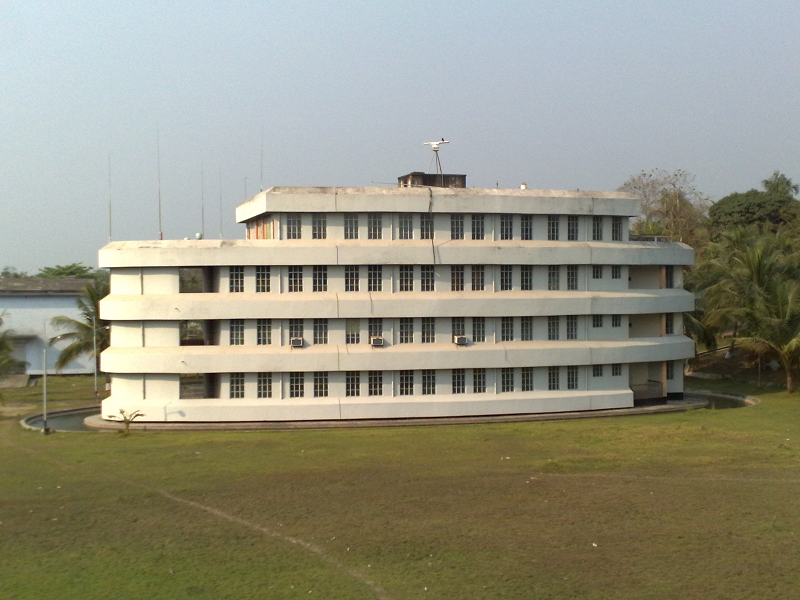
ENS block, Bangladesh Marine Academy

=== Simulators ===
Presently there are two types of simulators:

- GMDSS
- Radar and Arpa Simulator With ECDIS
- Bridge room simulator

=== Laboratories ===
- Electrical Lab
- Mechanical Lab
- Physics Lab
- Computer Lab
- Pneumatic Lab

=== Workshops ===
There are two workshops with various machineries

=== Other facilities ===
- Fire fighting center
- Auditorium
- Training boats
- Swimming pool
- Football ground
- Basketball ground

== Notable alumni ==
- Abdul Awal Mintoo, businessman and politician(Minister)
- M. Zakaria, former chairman of Chittagong Port Authority
- Zahir Uddin Mahmood, former chairman of Chittagong Port Authority
- Zafrul Alam, assistant director of MPA Singapore
- Moin Ahmed, Special Envoy to the Minister of Shipping, Government of Bangladesh
- Azizul Islam, musician

== See also ==
- Bangladesh Marine Fisheries Academy
- Bangladesh Naval Academy
