= Seafarers' Memorial =

Coordinates: 22.2423°N 91.8387°E

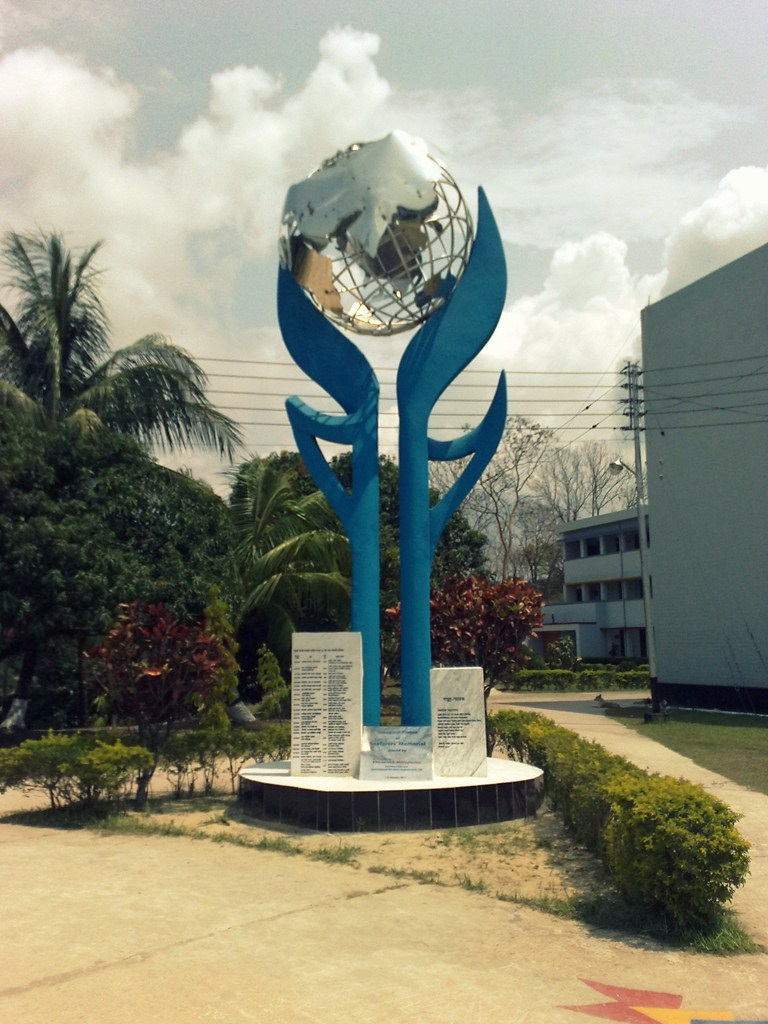
Seafarers' Memorial located at the center of Bangladesh Marine Academy Campus

Seafarers' Memorial is situated at the center of the Bangladesh Marine Academy campus. It is a memorial to all the Bangladesh Marine Academy cadets who lost their life at sea. International Maritime Organization (IMO) Secretary-General Efthimios E. Mitropoulos unveiled the memorial on 13 January 2011.
