= Bangabandhu Boat Museum =

- Established: 31 December 2020
- Dissolved: 1 February 2025
- Location: Barguna District, Bangladesh
- Type: Boat museum

The Bangabandhu Boat Museum was a specialized boat museum located in the Barguna District, Bangladesh. It was the first boat museum established in the country.

== History ==
The foundation stone of the museum was laid on 8 October 2020 under the initiative of then Deputy Commissioner Mostain Billah. The construction of the museum was completed within just 81 days. The establishment was officially inaugurated on 31 December 2020, and it was opened to the public on 10 January 2021. The museum was named the Bangabandhu Boat Museum in honor of Mujib Year.

== Description ==
The museum was built on about 78% of its total land area. Its architecture resembles a large boat, approximately 165 feet long and 30 feet wide. It was designed as a self-contained complex. The interior included facilities such as a boat research center, modern library, Bangabandhu and Liberation War corner, children's recreation center, and food court.

== Attack and demolition ==
On 1 February 2025, activists of the Bangladesh Nationalist Party (BNP) attacked and completely demolished the country's only boat museum. Starting from 10 a.m., BNP leaders and activists, along with hired workers, dismantled the structure. Despite being informed, the administration reportedly took no action.
