= Postal Museum, Dhaka =

Postal Museum
- Location: General Post Office, Dhaka, Bangladesh.
- Coordinates: 23.7283°N 90.4109°E
- Type: philately

The Postal Museum is a museum specialising in philately, located in the General Post Office, Dhaka, Bangladesh.

The Postal Museum was inaugurated in 1985 but it was not so popular.
