= Pari Bibi =

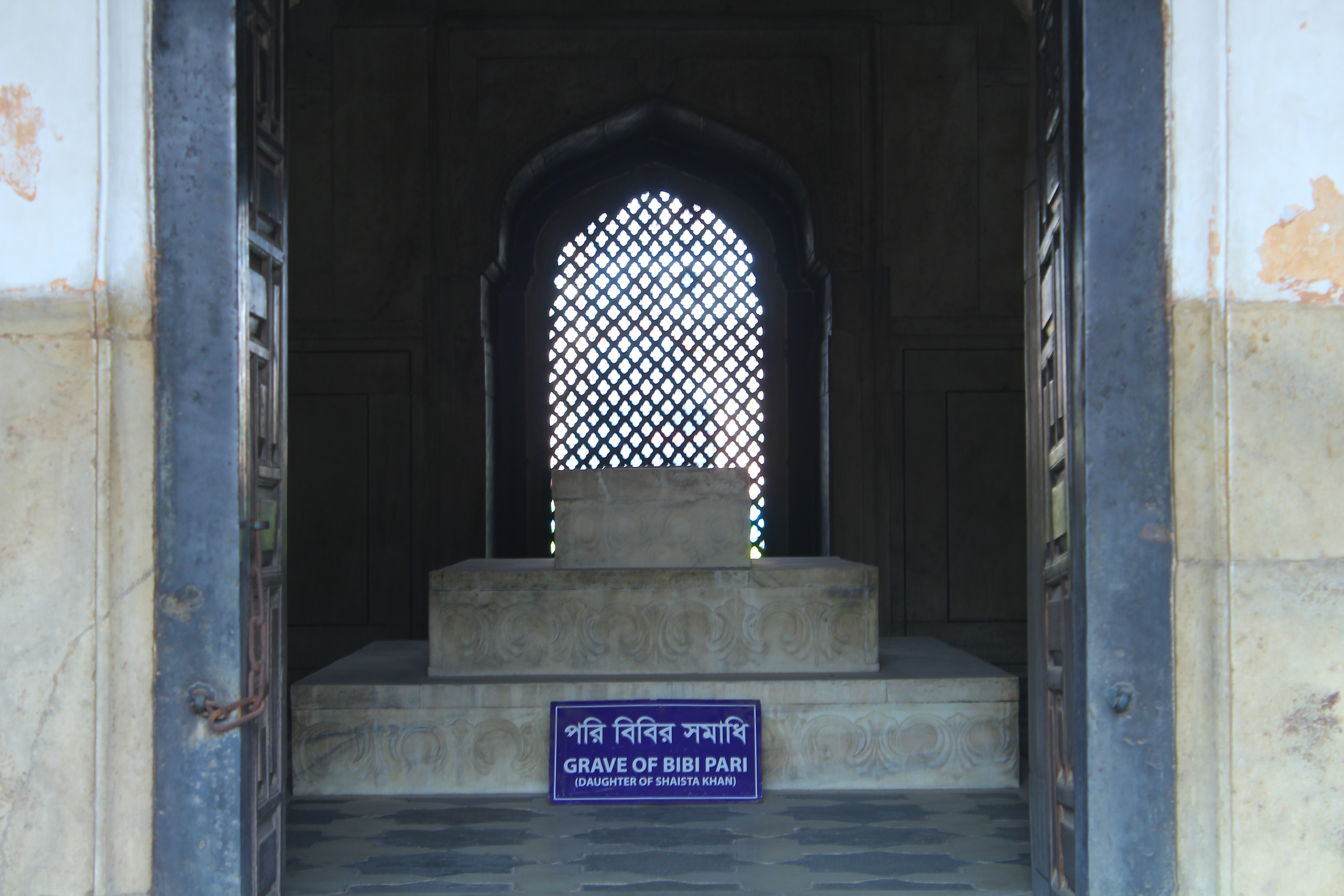
- Tomb of Pari Bibi
- Born: Iran Dukht Rahmat Bano; Dhaka, Bengal Subah, Mughal Empire
- Died: 1684; Dhaka, Bengal Subah, Mughal Empire
- Burial: Dhaka, Bangladesh
- Father: Shaista Khan
- Religion: Shia Islam

Pari Bibi (Fairy Lady, Bengali: পরী বিবি), formally known as Iran Dukht Rahmat Bano, who died in 1678, was the daughter of Shaista Khan, who was the son of Asaf Khan IV and brother of Mumtaz Mahal. At the time of her death, she was betrothed to Prince Azam, who became the future Mughal Emperor Muhammad Azam Shah. She was the grandniece of Nur Jahan, the main consort of the Mughal Emperor Jahangir.

== Biography ==
Pari Bibi was the daughter of Shaista Khan and was also known as Iran Dukht Rahmat Banu. She was engaged to Muhammad Azam, the son of Mughal Emperor Aurangzeb, on 3 May 1668. She lived in Dhaka, Bengal Subah (province), her father was the governor of the province. Mughal records of that era showed that she played an influential role in the governor household and the politics of the province.

== Death and tomb ==
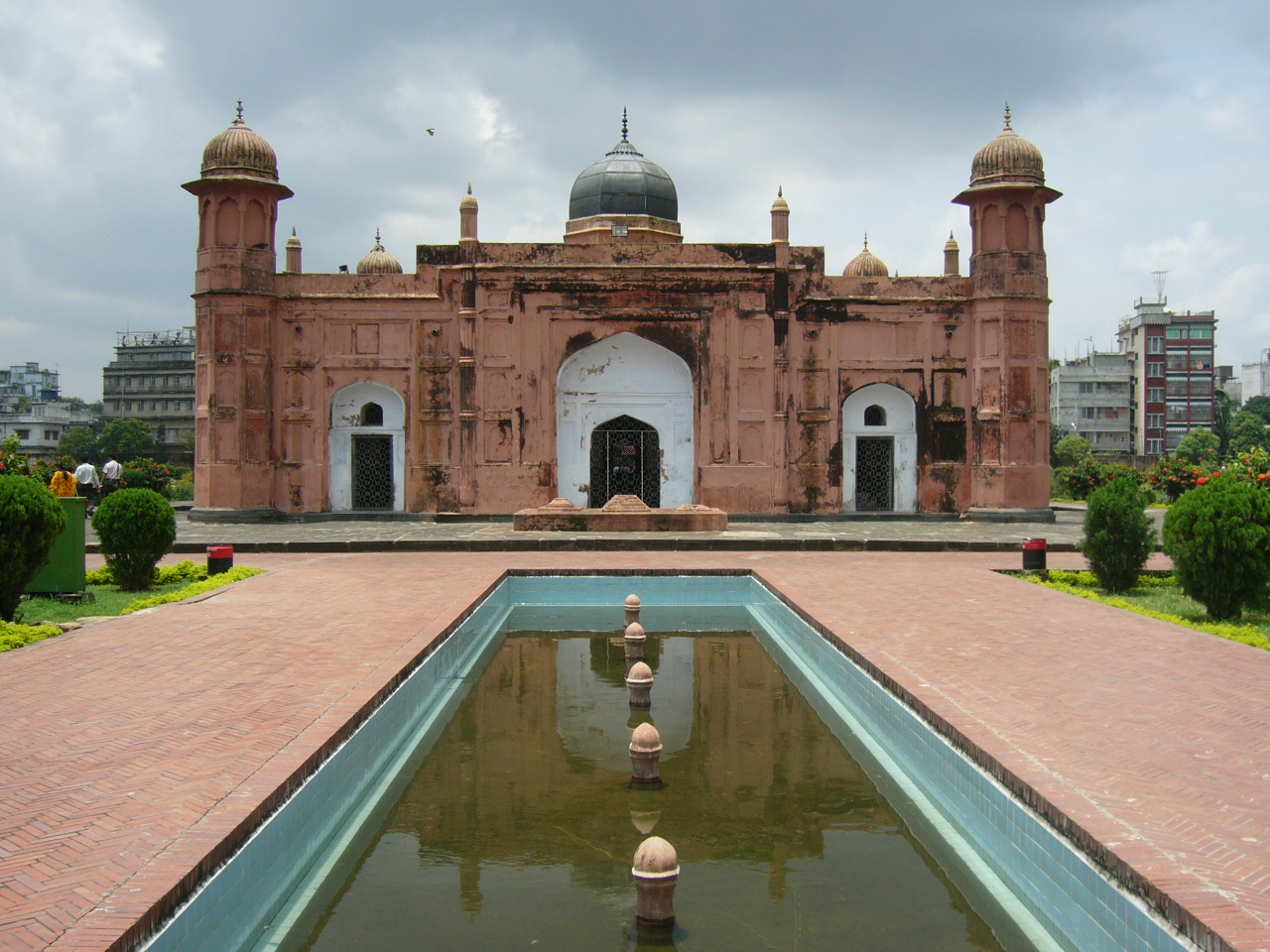
Tomb of Pari Bibi

In 1678, Pari Bibi died a premature death and left her father heartbroken. Shaista Khan was constructing the Lalbagh Fort in Dhaka, the construction of which had started under her fiancé Prince Muhammad Azam. Shaista Khan now viewed the fort as inauspicious and stopped construction of the fort. He built the tomb of his daughter with the compound of the fort. Other sources have reported that the tomb was constructed by Prince Azam himself. The Tomb of Pari Bibi is considered an important architectural site in Dhaka, Bangladesh. Since 1974 the tomb and fort have been managed by the Department of Archaeology.

== See also ==
- List of archaeological sites in Bangladesh
