= Bangladesh Bank Taka Museum =

Bangladesh Bank Currency Museum
- টাকা জাদুঘর
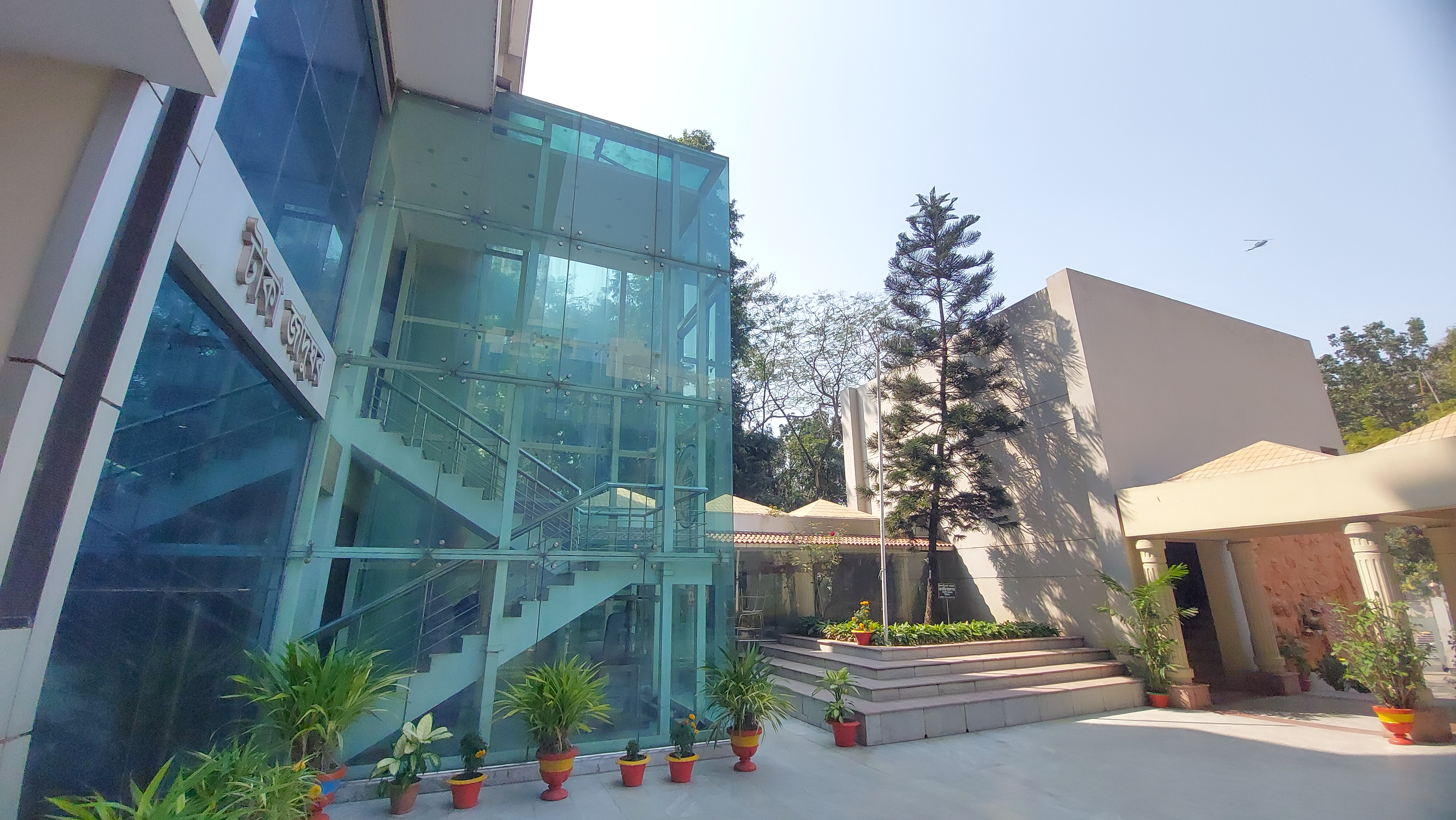
- Former name: Taka Museum
- Established: 5 October 2013; 9 years ago
- Location: Mirpur-2, Dhaka, Bangladesh
- Coordinates: 23°48.7′N 90°21.34′E
- Type: Currency museum
- Accreditation: ICOMON
- Collections: Currency from the ancient to the modern period
- Collection size: 10,600 (2024)
- Visitors: approx. 250 per day
- Founder: Bangladesh Bank
- Parking: Available
- Website: https://bb.org.bd/museum

Bangladesh Bank Currency Museum (Bengali: বাংলাদেশ ব্যাংক কারেন্সি মিউজিয়াম) (formerly "Bangladesh Bank Taka Museum") is a numismatic museum in Dhaka, Bangladesh run by Bangladesh Bank. The museum displays the history of currency in Bangladesh from the ancient times to the present. It also displays the currencies of different countries of the world.

== History ==
Bangladesh Bank Currency Museum was first established as a Currency Museum in 2009 at the 3rd floor of the main building of Bangladesh Bank at Motijheel in Dhaka, Bangladesh. But it was not open to the general public. Considering the importance and necessity, Atiur Rahman, former governor of Bangladesh Bank, took the initiative to establish a full-fledged currency museum equipped with modern digital facilities, technology, architecture and art. Later, the Bangladesh Bank Currency Museum (formerly "Bangladesh Bank Taka Museum") was established at the Bangladesh Bank Training Academy in Mirpur, Dhaka, on 5 October 2013 by Shirin Sharmin Chaudhury. From then the museum is open to all.

== Galleries ==
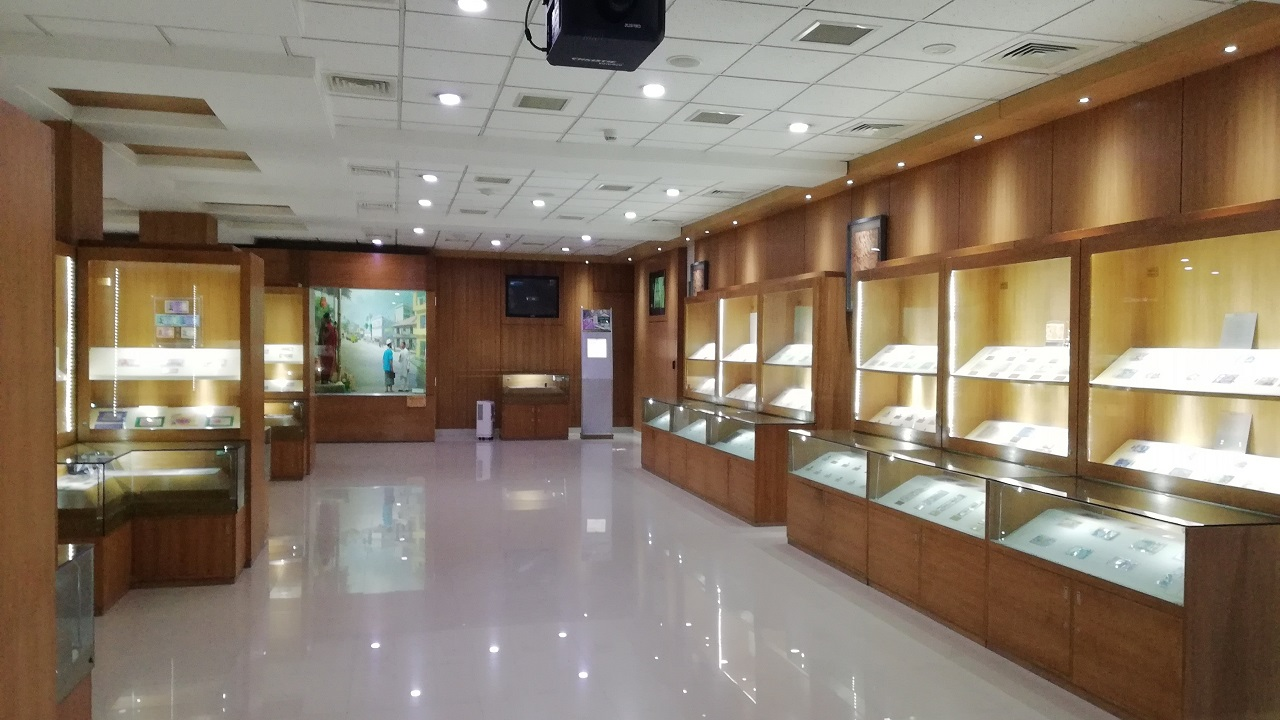
Gallery 1

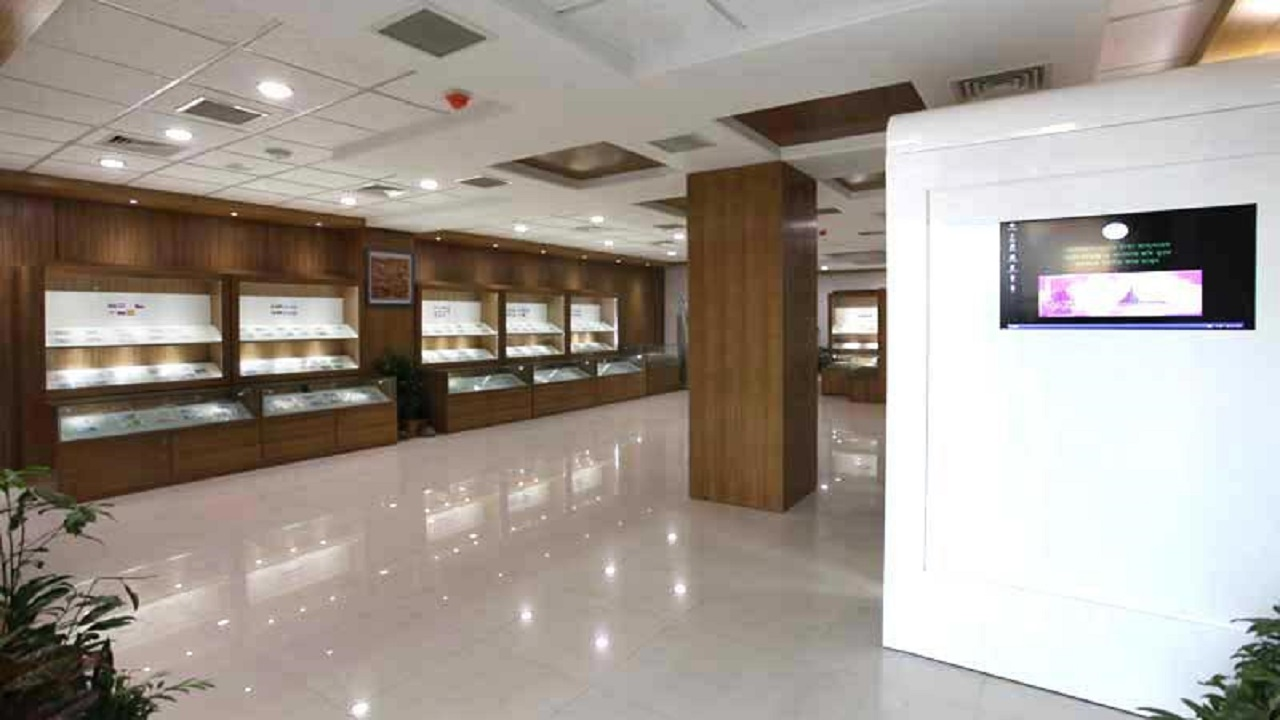
Gallery 2

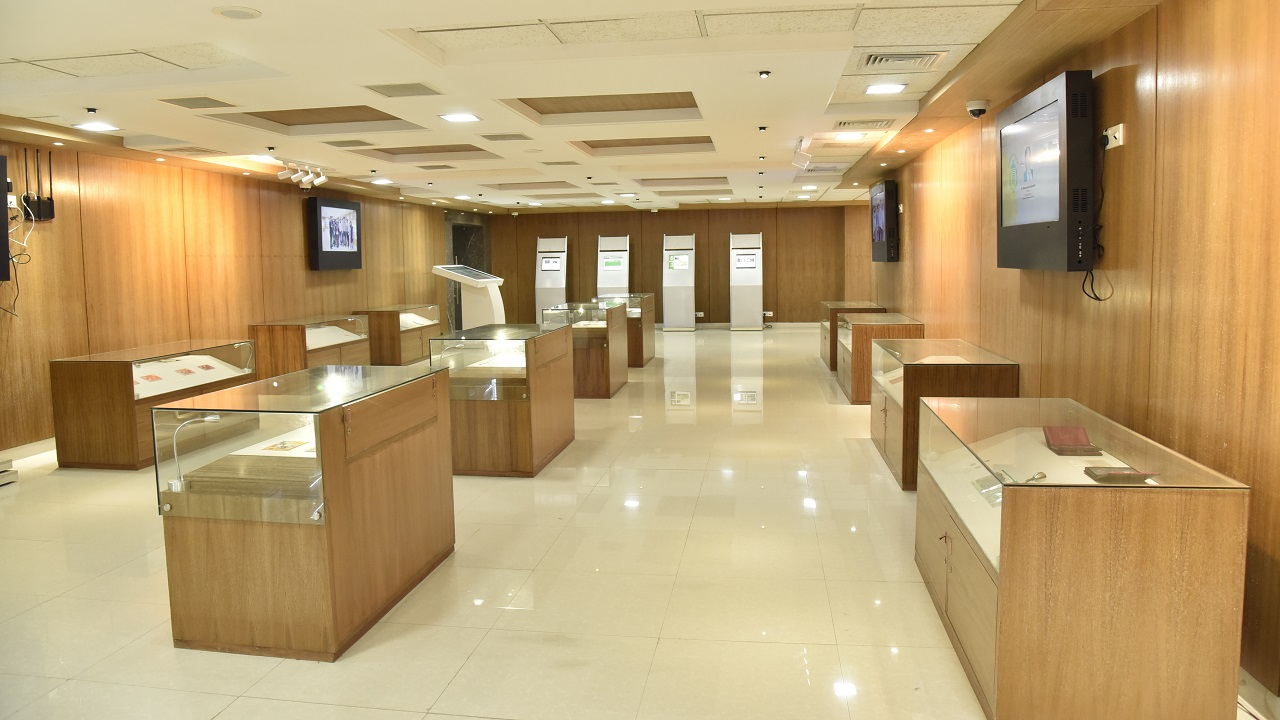
Gallery 3

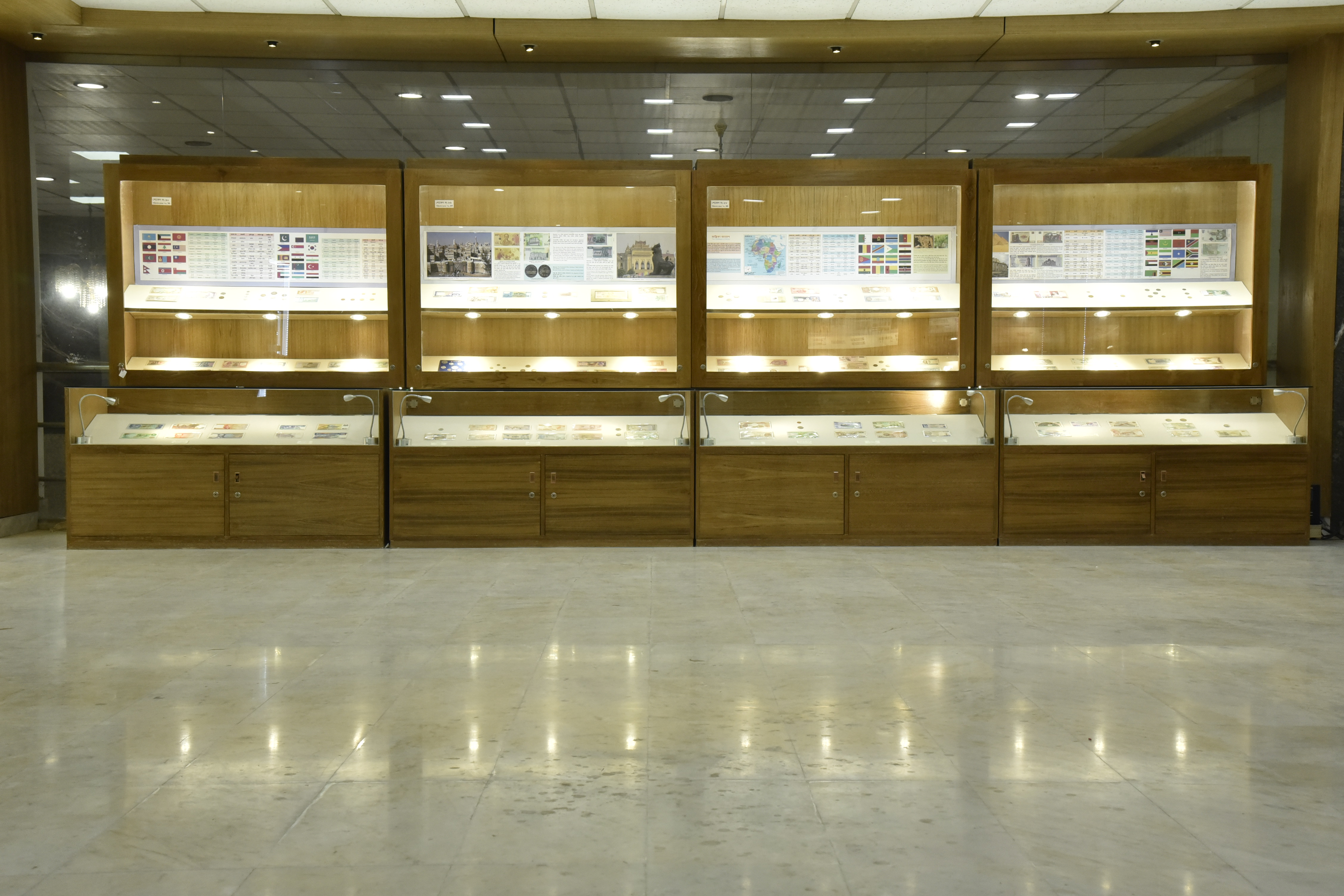
Gallery 4

== Collections ==
The total collection reaches to more than 10,500 in numbers at present (as of July 2025) including the metal and paper currency of Bangladesh from ancient to date and currencies from different countries of the world.

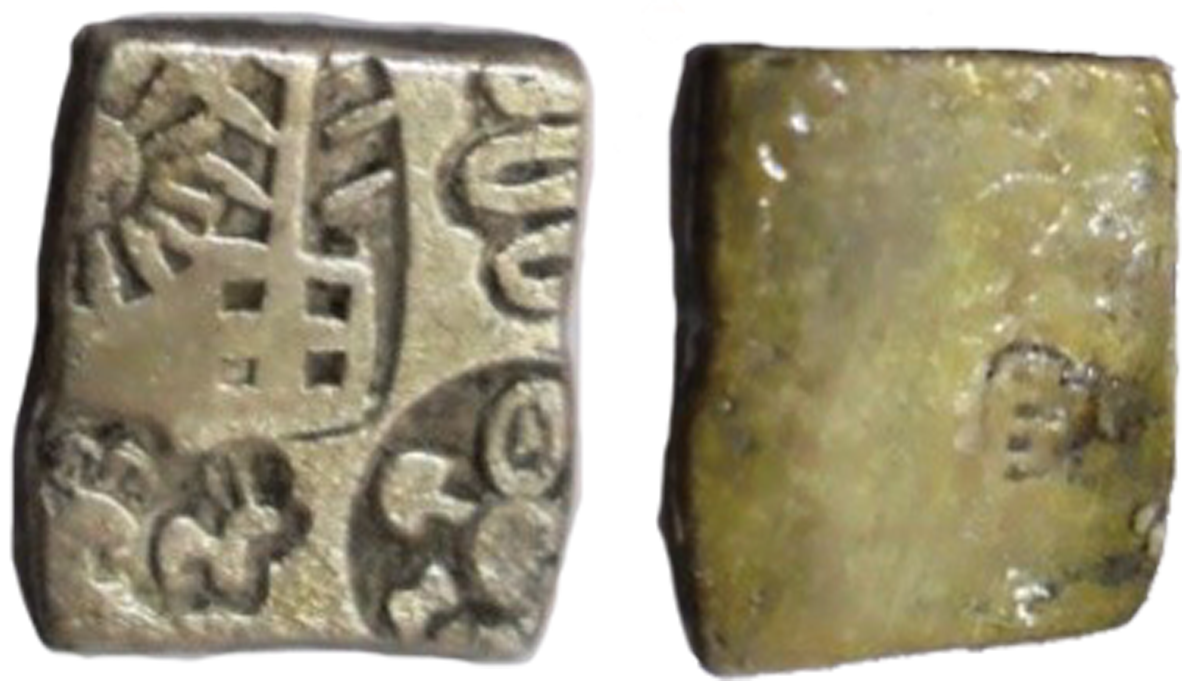
Silver punch-marked coin both sides

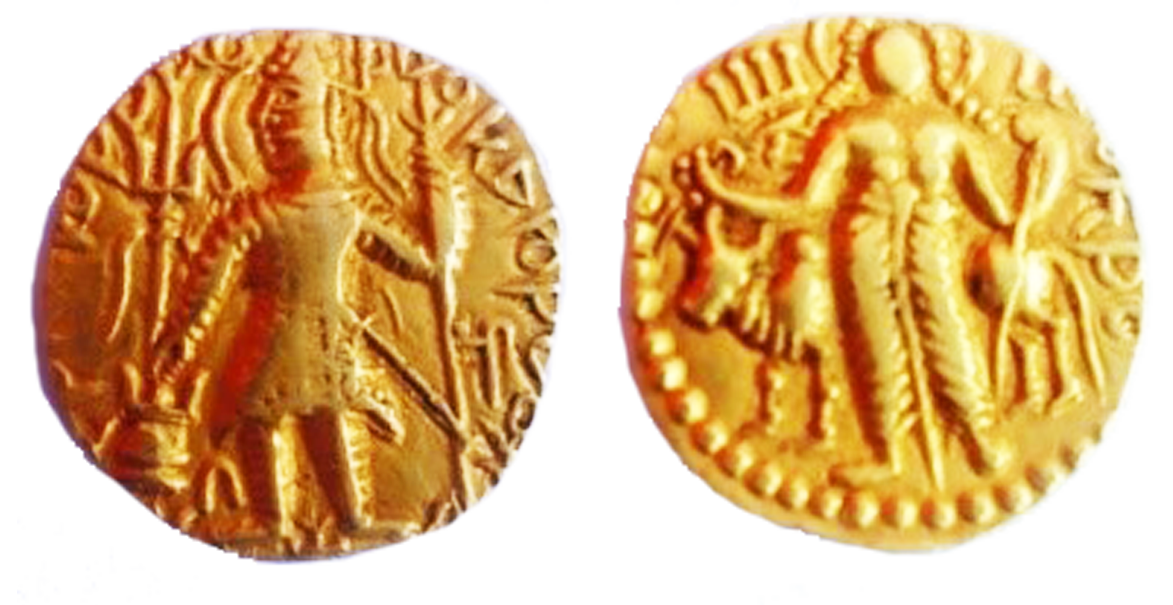
Gold coin of Kushana emperor both sides

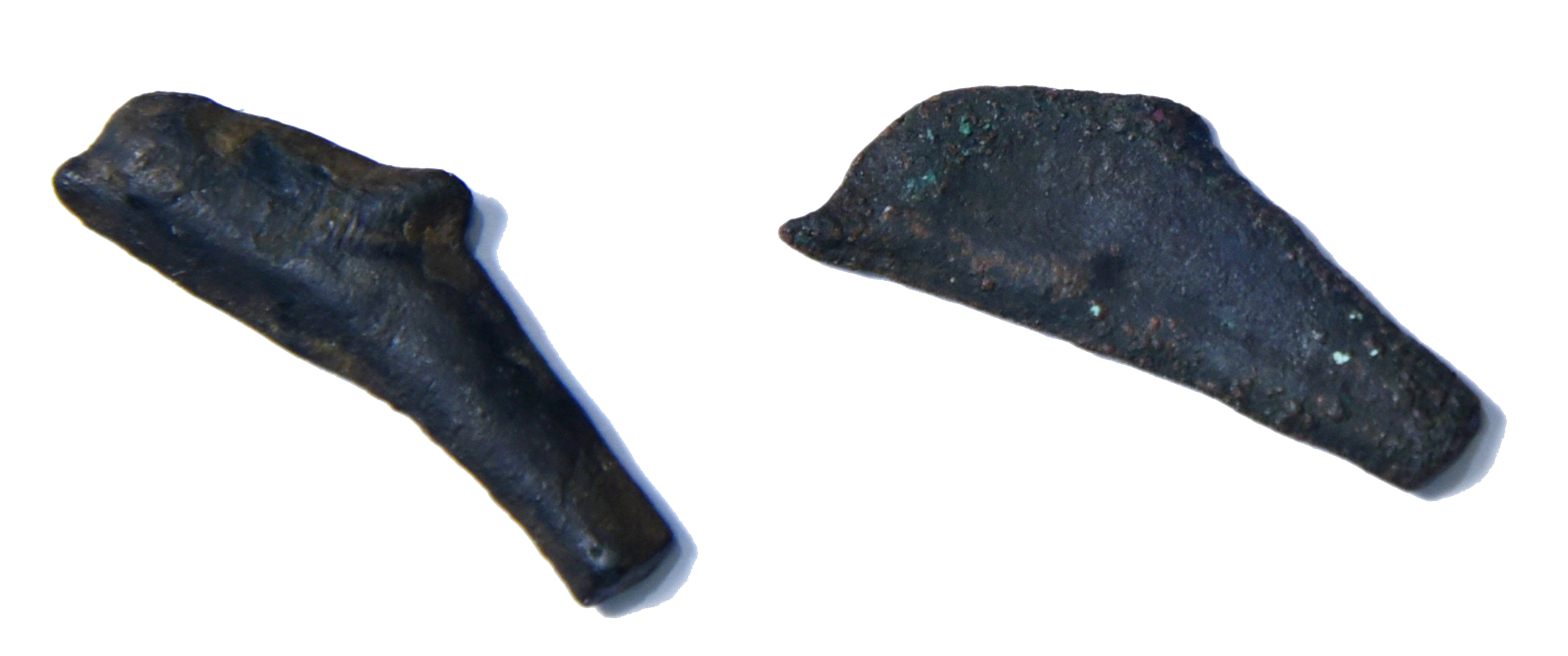
Dolphin Coin of Olbia Thrace, 5th - 4th Centuries B.C.

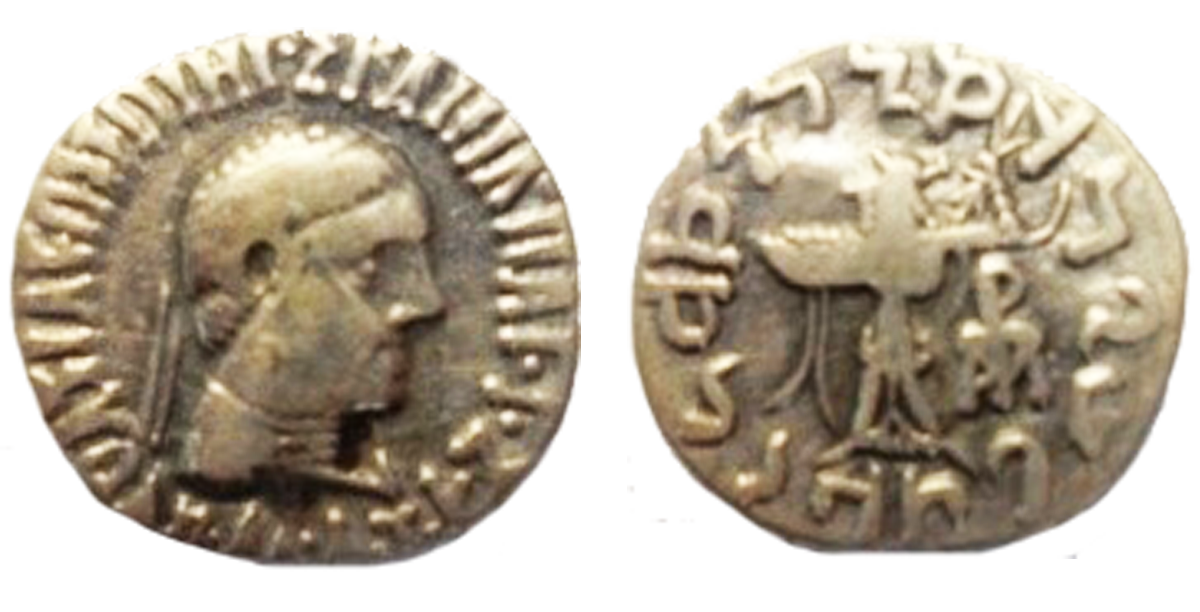
Silver Coin of Indo-Greek both sides

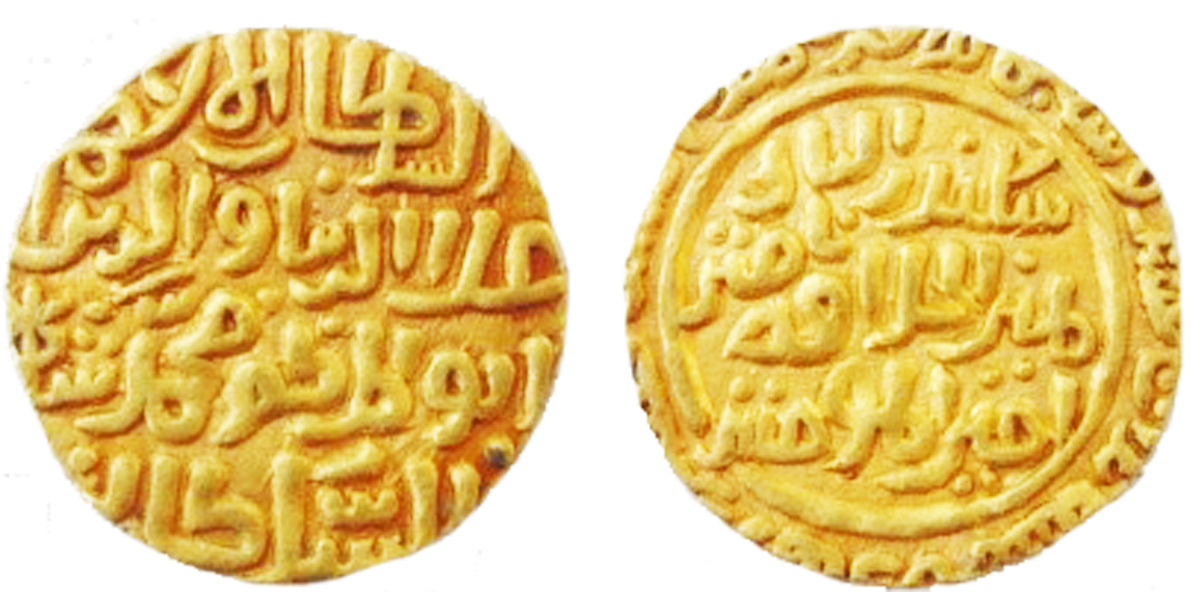
Gold Coin of Delhi Sultan Alauddin Muhammad Khilji both sides

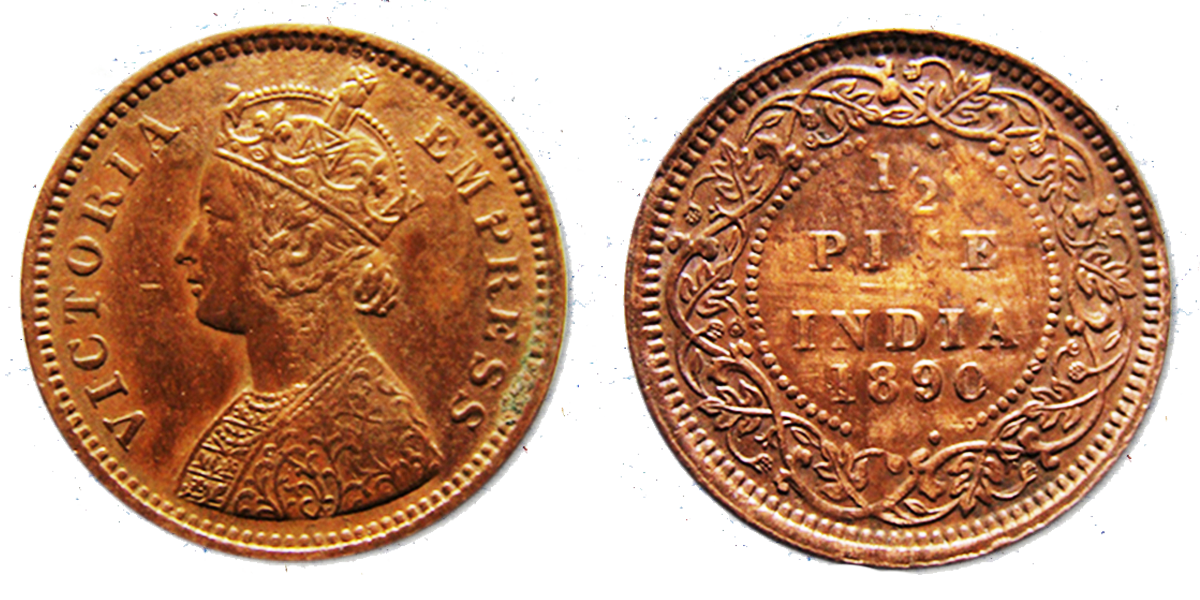
Half pice of Empress Victoria both sides

== See also ==
- The Security Printing Corporation (Bangladesh) Ltd.
