= Bangladesh Maritime Museum =

Museum in Bangladesh

Coordinates: 22.242°N 91.839°E

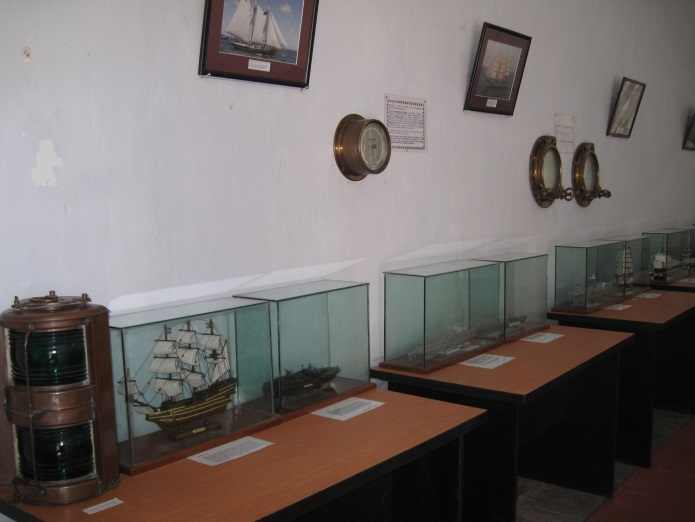
Bangladesh Maritime Museum.

Bangladesh Maritime Museum is a museum in a small room at the old seamanship class building in Bangladesh Marine Academy.

The US chapter of the Juldia Marine Academy Alumni Association (JMAAA) took the initiative to obtain permission from the Bangladesh government to house the various artifacts inside. These were mostly donated by JMAAA USA.
