= List of Catholic dioceses in Haiti =

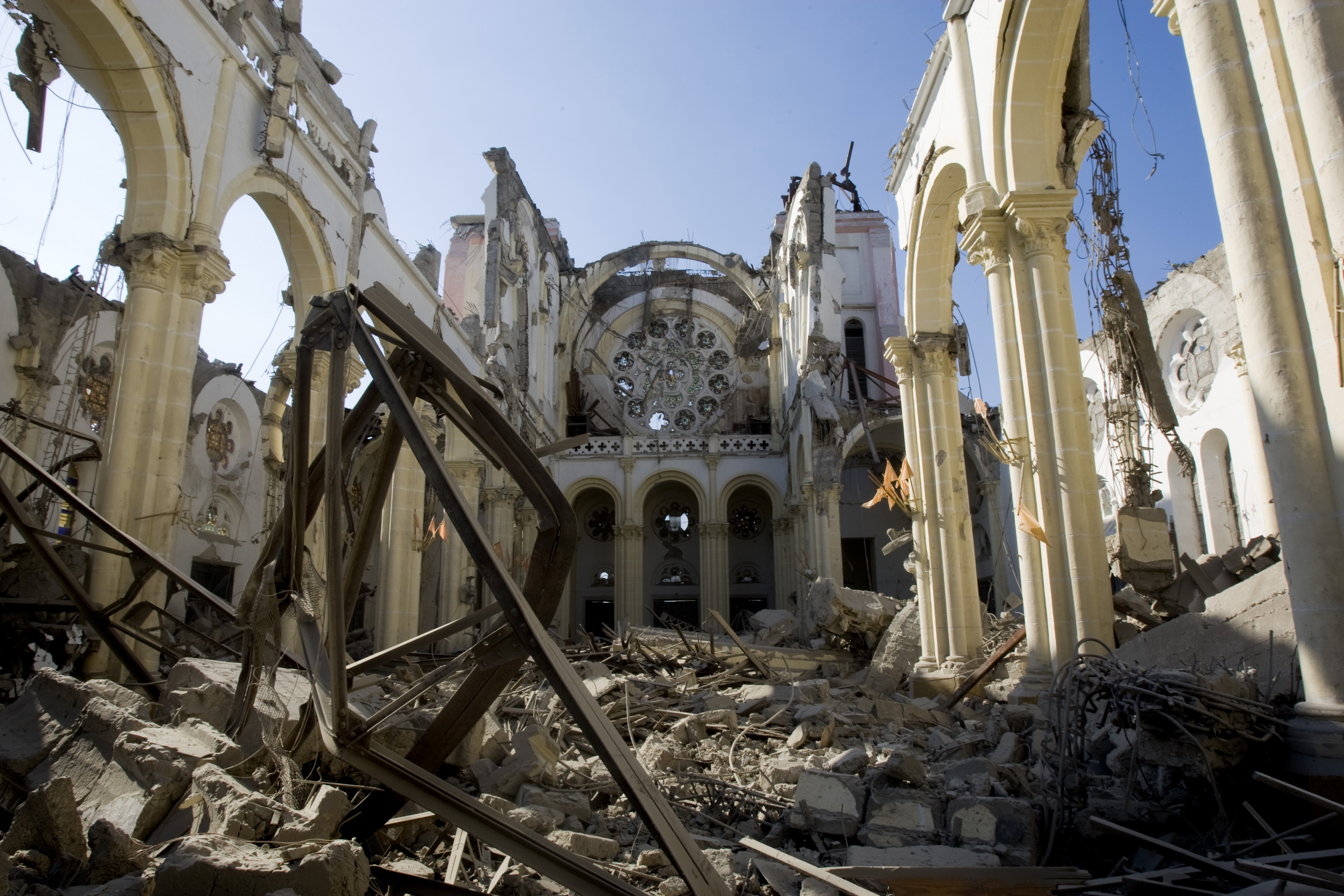
Remnants of the Cathedral of Our Lady of the Assumption after its collapse during the 2010 Haiti earthquake. In 2020, the building is still in ruins.

The Catholic Church in Haiti (Greater Antilles) consists only of a Latin hierarchy,
joint in the national Episcopal Conference of Haiti, comprising two ecclesiastical provinces, each headed by a Metropolitan Archbishop, with a total of eight suffragan dioceses, each headed by a bishop.

There are no Eastern Catholic, pre-diocesan or other exempt jurisdictions.

There are no titular sees. All defunct jurisdictions have current successor sees.

There is an Apostolic Nunciature to Haiti as papal diplomatic representation (embassy-level) in the national capital Port-au-Prince.

== Current Latin dioceses ==
=== Ecclesiastical province of Cap-Haïtien ===
- Metropolitan Archdiocese of Cap-Haïtien
  - Diocese of Fort-Liberté
  - Diocese of Hinche
  - Diocese of Les Gonaïves
  - Diocese of Port-de-Paix

=== Ecclesiastical province of Port-au-Prince ===
- Metropolitan Archdiocese of Port-au-Prince
  - Diocese of Anse-à-Veau and Miragoâne
  - Diocese of Jacmel
  - Diocese of Jérémie
  - Diocese of Les Cayes

== See also ==
- List of Catholic dioceses (structured view)
- Catholic Church in Haiti

== Sources ==
- GCatholic.org - data for all sections.
- Catholic-Hierarchy entry.
