= Sylvain Ducange =

Haitian Roman Catholic prelate (1963–2021)

- Auxiliary Bishop of Port-au-Prince
- Archdiocese: Port-au-Prince
- Elected: 4 June 2016
- In office: 4 June 2016 – 8 June 2021
- Predecessor: Quesnel Alphonse

Orders
- Ordination: 8 July 1995
- Consecration: 4 June 2016 by Louis Kébreau

Personal details
- Born: 5 April 1963 Port-au-Prince, Haiti
- Died: 8 June 2021 (aged 58) Mirebalais, Haiti
- Denomination: Roman Catholic
- Education: Collège Dominique Savio
- Coat of arms

Sylvain Ducange S.D.B. (5 April 1963 – 8 June 2021) was a Haitian Roman Catholic prelate. He served as Auxiliary Bishop of Port-au-Prince from 2016 to 2021.

== Biography ==
Ducange attended primary school in Lascahobas and graduated from the Collège Dominique Savio in Pétion-Ville. In 1985, he joined the Salesians of Don Bosco in Jarabacoa, Dominican Republic. He then taught at Collège Dominique Savio from 1986 to 1987 before returning to the Dominican Republic to study at Madre y Maestra in Santo Domingo. From 1991 to 1994, he studied at the Institut d'études théologiques in Brussels and was ordained in Port-au-Prince on 8 July 1995.

Ducange returned to Europe in 1996 to study educational science at the Salesian Pontifical University in Rome. From January 2010 to January 2016, he was Provincial Superior of the Salesians in Haiti. Pope Francis then appointed him Titual Bishop of Novæ and Auxiliary Bishop of Port-au-Prince on 4 June 2016. He received his episcopal consecration on 27 August 2016 from Monsignor Louis Kébreau, Archbishop Emeritus of Cap-Haïtien.

Ducange died of COVID-19 in Mirebalais on 8 June 2021, at the age of 58.
