= Our Lady of the Assumption Cathedral, Les Cayes =

Coordinates: 18.193031°N 73.747933°W

Our Lady of the Assumption Cathedral
- Cathédrale Notre-Dame de l’Assomption
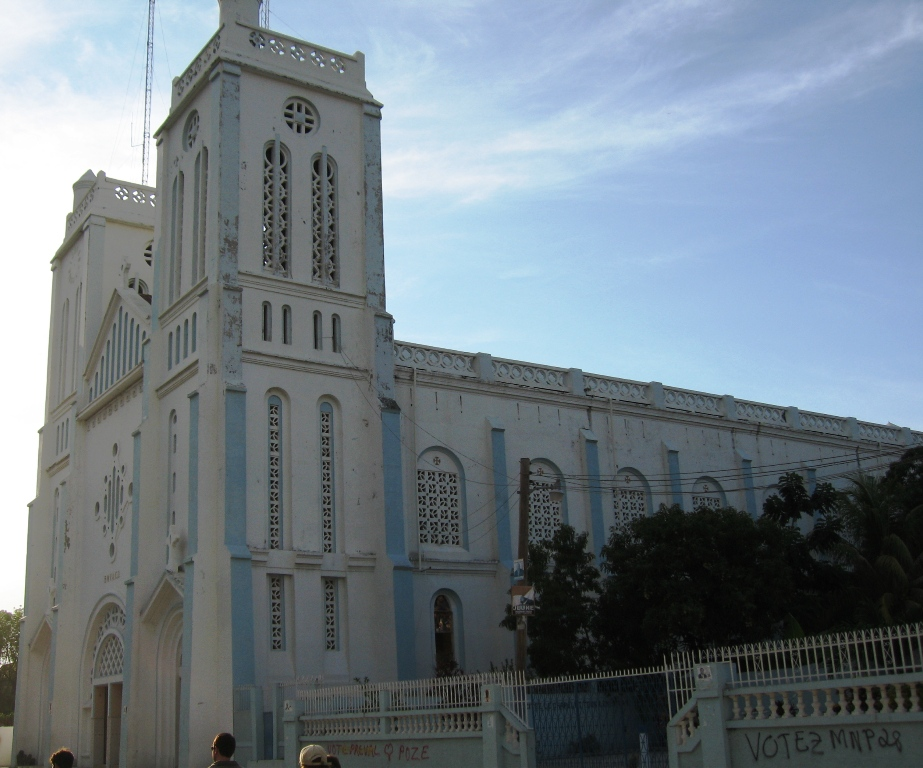
- Our Lady of the Assumption Cathedral
- Location: Les Cayes
- Country: Haiti
- Denomination: Roman Catholic Church

Administration
- Diocese: Roman Catholic Diocese of Les Cayes

The Our Lady of the Assumption Cathedral (French: Cathédrale Notre-Dame de l’Assomption ) also called Les Cayes Cathedral Is the name given to a religious building of the Catholic Church located in the city of Les Cayes (Okay) in the Department of the South (département du Sud ), southwest of Hispaniola Island and west of the Caribbean country of Haiti.

Its history goes back to 1722 when the faithful Catholics decided to build a church and a rectory that was finished in 1726. The cathedral follows the Latin or Roman rite and is the mother church of the Diocese of Les Cayes (Dioecesis Caiesensis) created in 1861 by the Bull "Christianae religionis" of Pope Pius IX.

It is under the pastoral responsibility of Cardinal Chibly Langlois.

== See also ==
- List of cathedrals in Haiti
- Roman Catholicism in Haiti
- Cathedral of Our Lady of the Assumption, Port-au-Prince
