= Quesnel Alphonse =

Haitian Roman Catholic bishop (born 1949)

His Excellency Quesnel Alphonse S.M.M.
- Bishop of Fort-Liberté
- Church: Catholic Church
- Diocese: Fort-Liberté
- Appointed: 25 October 2014
- Installed: 13 December 2014
- Term ended: 1 September 2026
- Predecessor: Louis Kébreau
- Successor: Jean-Pierre Sander
- Previous post: Auxiliary Bishop of Port-au-Prince (2012–2014)

Orders
- Ordination: 16 July 1977
- Consecration: 22 December 2012 by Guire Poulard

Personal details
- Born: 1 December 1949 (age 76) Port-au-Prince, Haiti

Quesnel Alphonse, S.M.M. (born 1 December 1949) is a Haitian Roman Catholic prelate. He served as Bishop of Fort-Liberté from 2014 until his retirement in 2026. He previously served as an auxiliary bishop of the Archdiocese of Port-au-Prince, with the titular see of Dionysiana since 2012 until 2014.

== Early life and education ==
Quesnel Alphonse was born on 1 December 1949 in Port-au-Prince, Haiti. He received his primary and secondary education at the Brothers of the Sacred Heart in Port-au-Prince. He entered the Montfort Missionaries (S.M.M.), making his first religious profession in 1972 and his perpetual vows in October 1977. He studied philosophy and theology at the Grand Séminaire Notre-Dame d'Haïti in Port-au-Prince. He later completed specialized studies in catechesis at the Institut Catholique de Paris in 1986–1987 and attended courses for formators in Bolivia in 1988.

== Priesthood ==
Alphonse was ordained a priest on 16 July 1977. After his ordination, he served as teacher and director of Collège Notre-Dame de Lourdes in Port-de-Paix from 1978 to 1980. From 1980 to 1986, he was director of the Catechetical Centre of the Archdiocese of Cap-Haïtien and master of novices for the Montfort Missionaries. He was director of the Montfortian scholasticate from 1988 to 1989 and provincial superior of the Montfort Missionaries from 1990 to 1996.

After a sabbatical year in France in 1996–1997, Alphonse served as parish priest in Chansolme in the Diocese of Port-de-Paix from 1998 to 2001. From 2002 to 2007, he was director of the diocesan catechetical centre of Port-de-Paix and director of the diocesan centre for the promotion of pilgrimages and the diocesan radio station Voix de la Paix. From 2008 to 2012, he was parish priest of Saint-Louis, Roi de France, in Port-au-Prince.

== Episcopate ==
=== Auxiliary Bishop of Port-au-Prince ===
On 10 November 2012, Pope Benedict XVI appointed Alphonse auxiliary bishop of Port-au-Prince and titular bishop of Dionysiana. At the time of his appointment, he was parish priest of Saint-Louis, Roi de France, in Port-au-Prince.

He received episcopal consecration on 22 December 2012. The principal consecrator was Archbishop Guire Poulard, with Bishop Frantz Colímon and Bishop Chibly Langlois as principal co-consecrators.

=== Bishop of Fort-Liberté ===
On 25 October 2014, Pope Francis appointed Alphonse bishop of Fort-Liberté, succeeding as ordinary of the diocese after his service as auxiliary bishop of Port-au-Prince. He was installed on 13 December 2014.

The Montfort Missionaries reported that Alphonse's appointment made him the ordinary of a diocese in northeastern Haiti serving a large Catholic population. The congregation also highlighted his previous experience in formation, parish ministry and communications.

During his episcopate, Alphonse spoke about the humanitarian and security crisis in Haiti. In an interview with Aid to the Church in Need, he described the situation facing Haitians as one of survival and discussed the effects of violence, displacement, poverty and insecurity on communities in the country.

He also emphasized the Catholic Church's role in supporting people affected by the crisis and the importance of assistance to internally displaced people and other vulnerable communities.

=== Retirement ===
On 1 September 2026, Pope Leo XIV accepted Alphonse's resignation from the pastoral government of the Diocese of Fort-Liberté. On the same day, the pope appointed Jean-Pierre Sander Louis-Jean, previously auxiliary bishop of Port-au-Prince, as his successor.

== See also ==
Roman Catholic Diocese of Fort-Liberté
