= Alix Verrier =

Haitian Roman Catholic prelate (1931–2024)

Monsignor Alix Verrier
- Bishop Emeritus of Les Cayes
- Archdiocese: Port-au-Prince
- Diocese: Les Cayes
- Installed: 9 April 1988
- Term ended: 9 March 2009
- Predecessor: Jean-Jacques Claudius Angénor
- Successor: Guire Poulard

Orders
- Ordination: 13 July 1958
- Consecration: 9 March 1986 by Paolo Romeo

Personal details
- Born: 9 March 1931 Latiboliere, Haiti
- Died: 11 October 2024 (aged 93) Port-au-Prince, Haiti
- Denomination: Roman Catholic
- Coat of arms

Alix Verrier (9 March 1931 – 11 October 2024) was a Haitian Roman Catholic prelate. He served as Bishop of Les Cayes from 1988 to 2009. Verrier died in Port-au-Prince on 11 October 2024, at the age of 93.

Catholic Church titles
| Preceded by Jean-Jacques Claudius Angénor | Bishop of Les Cayes; 1988–2009 | Succeeded by Guire Poulard |
