= Léonard Pétion Laroche =

Haitian catholic priest (1918-2006)

- Bishop of Hinche
- Church: Catholic Church
- Diocese: Diocese of Hinche
- In office: 22 May 1982 – 30 June 1998
- Predecessor: Jean-Baptiste Décoste
- Successor: Louis Kébreau

Orders
- Ordination: 11 July 1943
- Consecration: 11 July 1982 by François-Wolff Ligondé

Personal details
- Born: 6 November 1918 La Vallée-de-Jacmel, Haiti
- Died: 14 June 2006 (aged 87)

Léonard Pétion Laroche (born 6 November 1918 in Jacmel) was a Haitian clergyman and bishop for the Roman Catholic Diocese of Hinche. He became ordained in 1943. He was appointed bishop in 1982. He died in 2006.
