= Diocese of Jacmel =

Roman Catholic diocese in Haiti

Coordinates: 18.2349°N 72.5352°W

Diocese of Jacmel Dioecesis Iacmeliensis Diocèse de Jacmel Dyosèz Jakmèl

Location
- Country: Haiti
- Ecclesiastical province: Province of Port-au-Prince
- Metropolitan: Jacmel

Statistics
- Area: 2,700 km^{2} (1,000 sq mi)
- Population: Total; Catholics: (as of 2008); 510,257; 331,667 (65%)
- Parishes: 25

Information
- Denomination: Roman Catholic
- Rite: Latin Rite
- Established: 25 February 1988 (38 years ago)
- Cathedral: Cathedral of St. James and St. Philip

Current leadership
- Pope: Leo XIV
- Bishop: Glandas Marie Erick Toussaint

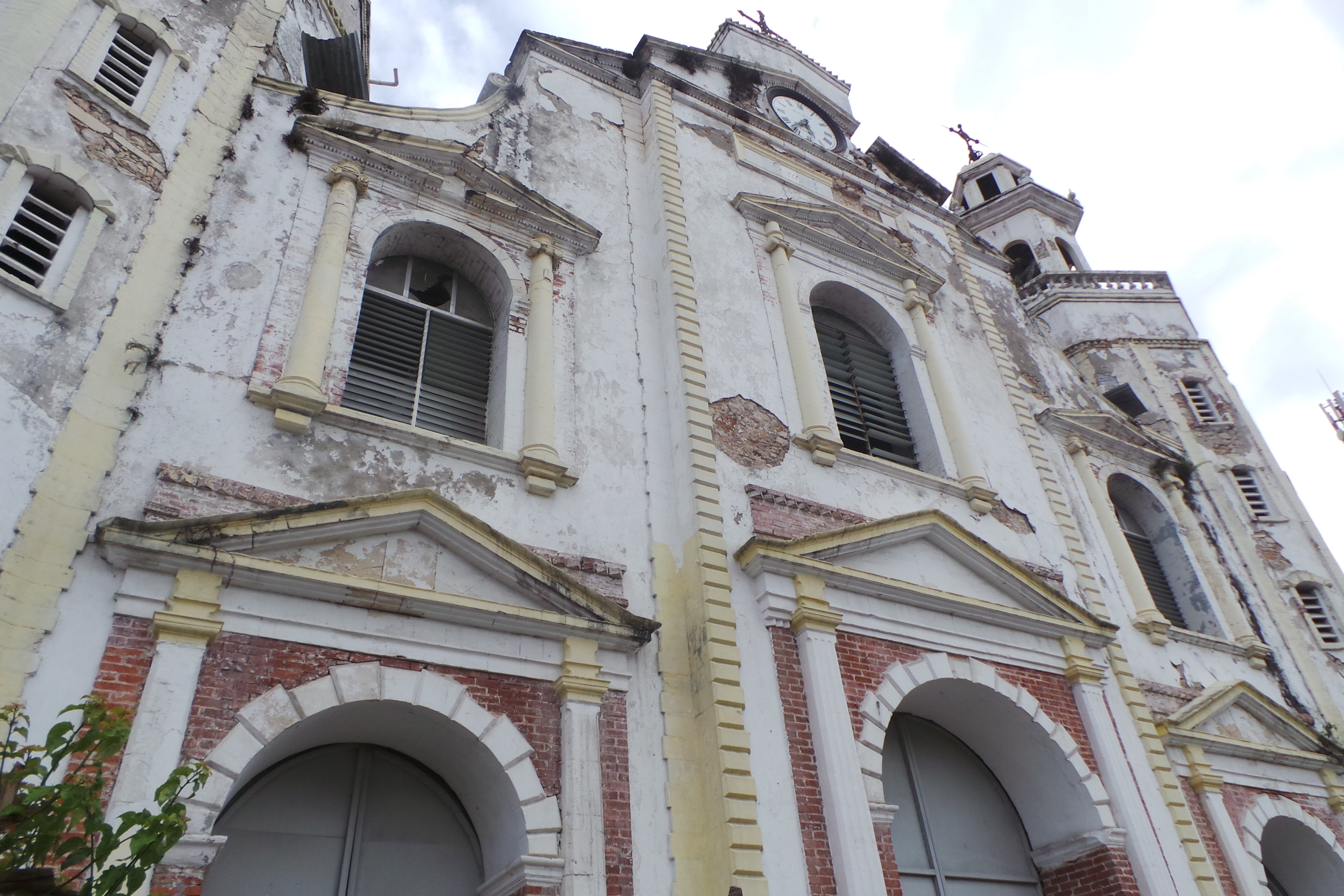
Jacmel Cathedral

The Diocese of Jacmel (Latin: Dioecesis Iacmeliensis; French: Diocèse de Jacmel; Haitian Creole: Dyosèz Jakmèl), erected 25 February 1988, is a suffragan of the Archdiocese of Port-au-Prince.

The diocese began with ten priests, and in 2007 had over fifty. Some have been sent as missionaries to such places as Brazil and Quebec.

== Bishops ==
=== Ordinaries ===
- Guire Poulard (25 February 1988 - 9 March 2009, appointed Bishop of Les Cayes)
- Launay Saturné (28 April 2010 - 16 July 2018, appointed Archbishop of Cap-Haïtien)
- Glandas Marie Erick Toussaint (8 December 2018)

=== Other priest of this diocese who became bishop ===
- Chibly Langlois, appointed Bishop of Fort-Liberté in 2004; future Cardinal

== External links and references ==
- "Diocese of Jacmel". Catholic-Hierarchy.
- "Diocèse de Jacmel". Official website. Archived from the original on 2007-09-28.
- "Diocèse de Jacmel". Archived from the original on 2002-02-13.
- GCatholic.org page for Diocese of Jacmel
