= Diomede Falconio =

Italian Cardinal of the Catholic Church

His Eminence Diomede Falconio O.F.M. Ref.
- Prefect of the Congregation of Religious
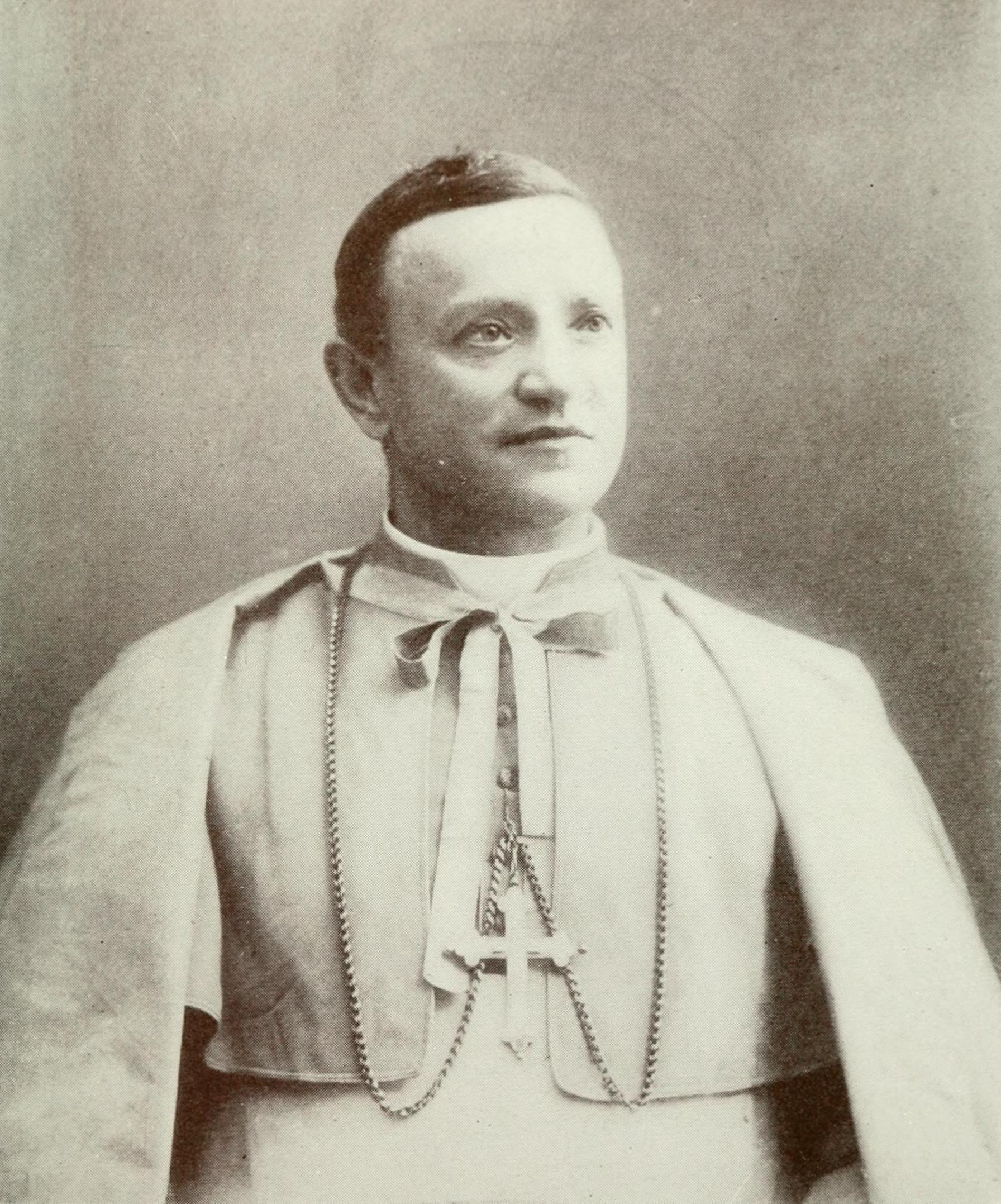
- Church: Catholic Church
- Appointed: 26 February 1916
- Term ended: 8 February 1917
- Predecessor: Domenico Serafini
- Successor: Giulio Tonti
- Other post: Cardinal-Bishop of Velletri (1914–17)
- Previous posts: Bishop of Lacedonia (1892–95); Archbishop of Acerenza (1895–99); Archbishop of Matera (1895–99); Apostolic Delegate to Canada and Newfoundland (1899–1902); Titular Archbishop of Larissa (1899–1911); Apostolic Delegate to the United States of America (1902–11); Cardinal-Priest of Santa Maria in Ara Coeli (1911–14)

Orders
- Ordination: 4 January 1866 by John Timon
- Consecration: 17 July 1892 by Raffaele Monaco La Valletta
- Created cardinal: 27 November 1911 by Pope Pius X
- Rank: Cardinal-Priest (1911–14); Cardinal-Bishop (1914–17)

Personal details
- Born: Angelo Raffaele Gennaro Falconio; 20 September 1842 Pescocostanzo, Kingdom of the Two Sicilies
- Died: 8 February 1917 (aged 74) Rome, Kingdom of Italy
- Parents: Donato Antonio Falconio; Maria Giacinta Buccigrossi
- Motto: Deus meus et Omnia
- Coat of arms

Diomede Angelo Raffaele Gennaro Falconio, O.F.M. (20 September 1842 – 8 February 1917) was an Italian Cardinal of the Catholic Church. He served as Prefect of the Congregation for Religious from 1916 until his death, and was elevated to the cardinalate in 1911. He was Apostolic Delegate to the United States from 1902 to 1911.

== Biography ==
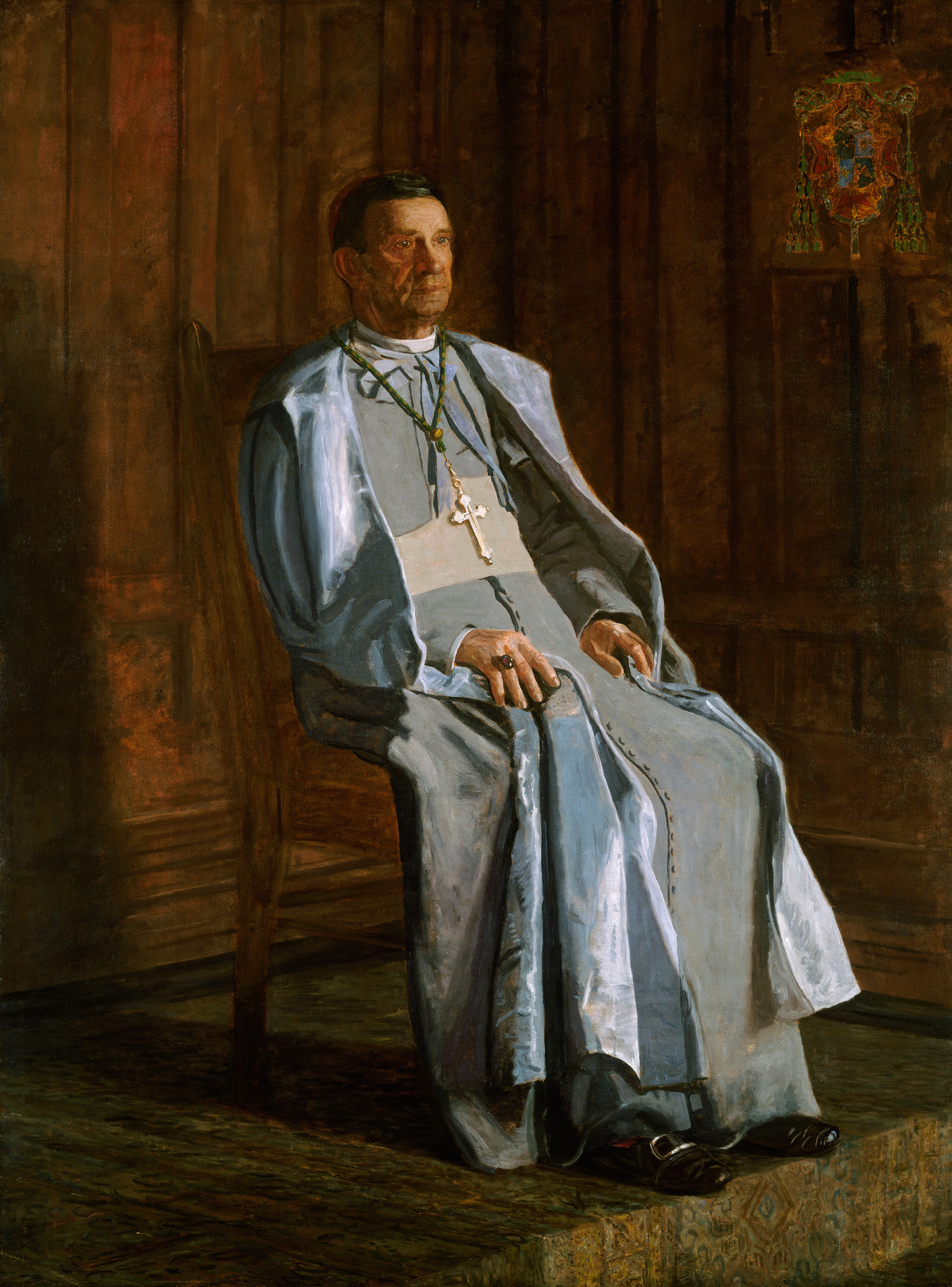
Portrait of Archbishop Falconio by Thomas Eakins.

Diomede Falconio was born in Pescocostanzo as one of the five children of Donato Antonio Falconio, a goldsmith, and his wife Maria Giacinta Buccigrossi. He received the Sacrament of Confirmation on 5 September 1852, and entered the Order of Friars Minor, more commonly known as the Franciscans, on 2 September 1860. Upon entering, he also changed his baptismal name from Angelo Raffaele Gennaro to Diomede from Pescocostanzo. Falconio studied at the Franciscan convents of Magliano and Carpineto, making his first vows on 17 September 1861 and his perpetual vows on 12 October 1864.

In the autumn of 1865, he traveled to the United States, where he was ordained to the priesthood by Bishop John Timon, CM, on 4 January 1866, in Buffalo, New York. Falconio taught philosophy at St. Bonaventure's College and Seminary in Alleghany from 1865 to 1871, serving as its President from 1868 to 1869. After doing missionary work in Terra Nova, Canada, he received American citizenship. In 1867 he was made Secretary of the American Franciscan province of the Immaculate Conception.

Falconio served as administrator, chancellor, and vicar general of Harbor Grace in Canada between 1871 and 1882, and would have become its bishop had not the opposition of the Irish Benevolent Society to the appointment of an Italian bishop caused Falconio's superior to recall him to the United States. He performed missionary work in New York and Connecticut until 1883, whence he returned to Italy. From 1884 to 1889, he was the provincial of his religious order in the province of San Bernardino in Abruzzi. After becoming prosynodal examiner of the Archdiocese of L'Aquila, he was elected procurator general of the Franciscans in October 1889, and visitor general to the provinces of Naples and Apulia between 1889 and 1892.

Styles of Diomede Falconio
- Reference style: His Eminence
- Spoken style: Your Eminence
- Informal style: Cardinal
- See: Velletri-Segni (suburbicarian)

On 11 July 1892, Falconio was appointed Bishop of Lacedonia by Pope Leo XIII. He received his episcopal consecration on the following 17 July from Cardinal Raffaele Monaco La Valletta, with Archbishops Antonio Grasselli, OFM Conv, and Tancredo Fausti serving as co-consecrators, in the church of S. Antonio da Padova in Via Merulana. Falconio was later named Archbishop of Acerenza-Matera on 29 November 1895, the first Apostolic Delegate to Canada on 3 August 1899, and Titular Archbishop of Larissa in Thessalia on 30 September of that year.

Falconio was appointed Apostolic Delegate to the United States on 30 September 1902. During his tenure, he dedicated himself to the spiritual care of the linguistic minorities, providing spiritual assistance in their language and nominating bishops of the same ethnic origin or who at least spoke their language. Falconio was created Cardinal-Priest of Santa Maria in Aracoeli by Pope Pius X in the consistory of 27 November 1911, and opted to be promoted to Cardinal Bishop of Velletri on 25 May 1914. He was one of the cardinal electors who participated in the 1914 papal conclave, which selected Pope Benedict XV, who named Falconio Prefect of the Sacred Congregation for Religious on 26 February 1916.

Falconio died in Rome on 8 February 1917. He is buried in the Franciscan church of his native Pescocostanzo.

Catholic Church titles
Preceded by Francesco Niola	Bishop of Lacedonia; 1892–1895	Succeeded by Nicolo Zimarino
Preceded by Raffaele di Nonno, CSSR	Archbishop of Acerenza-Matera; 1895–1899	Succeeded by Raffaele Rossi
Preceded by none	Apostolic Delegate to Canada and Newfoundland; 1899–1902	Succeeded by Donato Sbarretti
Preceded by Sebastiano Martinelli, OSA	Apostolic Delegate to the United States; 1902–1911	Succeeded by Giovanni Bonzano
Preceded by Domenico Serafini, OSB	Prefect of the Sacred Congregation for Religious; 1916–1917	Succeeded by Giulio Tonti
