= Glandas Marie Erick Toussaint =

Haitian clergyman and bishop

- Bishop of Jacmel
- Church: Catholic Church
- Diocese: Diocese of Jacmel
- Appointed: 8 December 2018
- Predecessor: Launay Saturné
- Previous posts: Titular Bishop of Senez (2011-2018); Auxiliary Bishop of Port-au-Prince (2011-2018)

Orders
- Ordination: 13 November 1994 by Joseph Lafontant
- Consecration: 26 March 2011 by Joseph Lafontant

Personal details
- Born: 19 May 1965 (age 60) Grande Savane, Nord-Est, Haiti

Glandas Marie Erick Toussaint (born 19 May 1965 in Grande Savane) is a Haitian clergyman and bishop for the Roman Catholic Diocese of Jacmel. He was ordained in 1994. He was appointed Auxiliary Bishop of Port-au-Prince, Haiti, and Titular Bishop of Senez in 2011, and then Bishop of Jacmel in Haiti in 2018.
