= Simon-Pierre Saint-Hillien =

Roman Catholic bishop

Simon-Pierre Saint-Hillien C.S.C.
- Bishop of Hinche
- Church: Catholic Church
- Diocese: Diocese of Hinche
- In office: 6 August 2009 – 22 July 2015
- Predecessor: Louis Kébreau
- Successor: Désinord Jean
- Previous posts: Titular Bishop of Lamdia (2002-2009); Auxiliary Bishop of Port-au-Prince (2002-2009)

Orders
- Ordination: 28 December 1980
- Consecration: 22 February 2003 by Roger Etchegaray

Personal details
- Born: 6 July 1951 Gonaïves, Haiti
- Died: 22 July 2015 (aged 64)

Simon-Pierre Saint-Hillien C.S.C. (6 July 1951 – 22 July 2015) was a Roman Catholic bishop.

Ordained to the priesthood in 1980, Saint-Hillien was appointed auxiliary bishop in 2002 and then bishop of the Roman Catholic Diocese of Hinche, Haiti, in 2009.
