= Martial Testard du Cosquer =

French prelate

Martial-Guillaume-Marie Testard du Cosquer
- Archbishop of Port-au-Prince
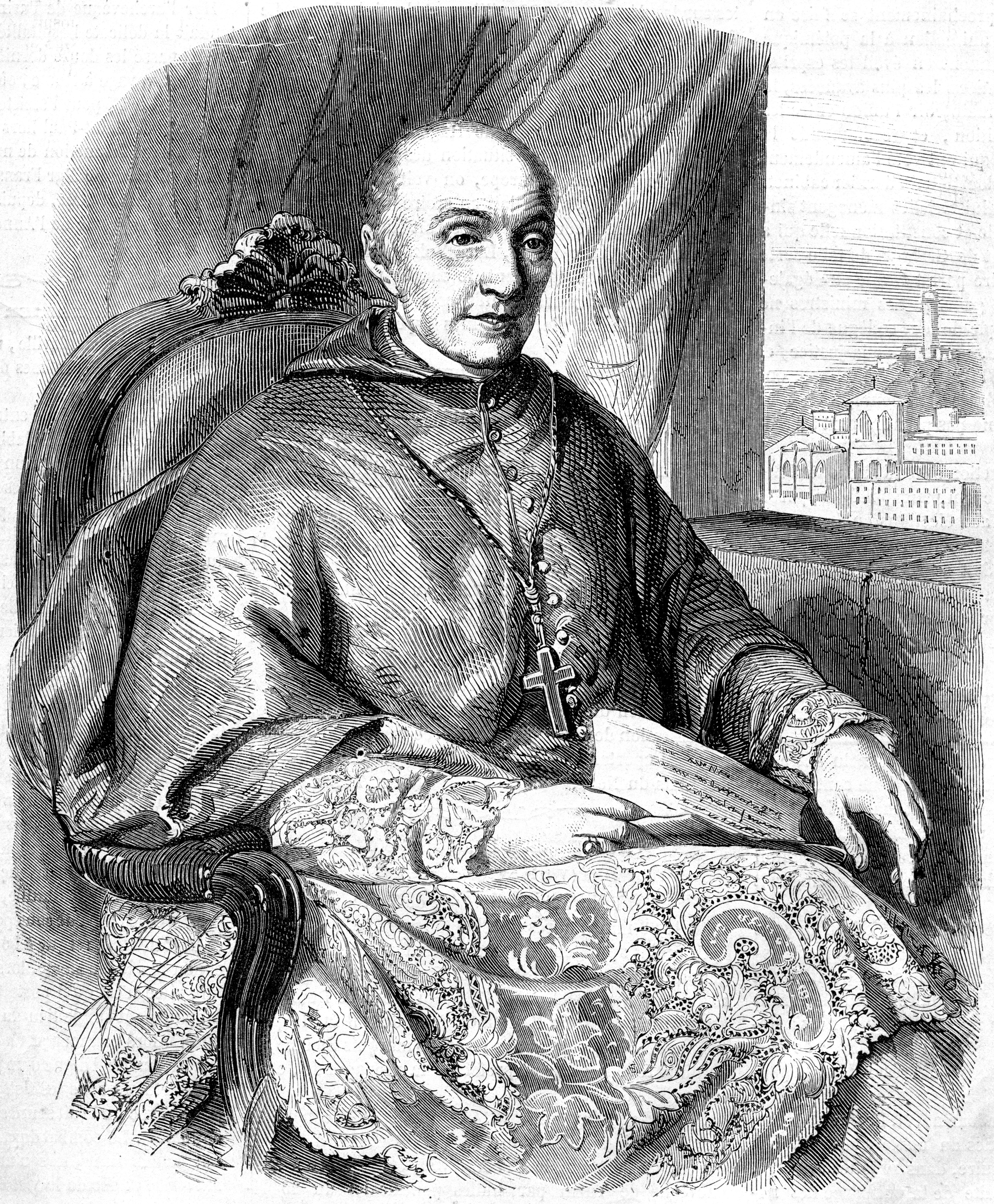
- See: Archdiocese of Port-au-Prince
- Appointed: September 7, 1863
- Term ended: July 27, 1869 (his death)
- Predecessor: Office established
- Successor: Alexis-Jean-Marie Guilloux

Orders
- Ordination: April 22, 1848
- Consecration: October 18, 1863

Personal details
- Born: September 22, 1820 Lesneven, Brittany, France
- Died: July 27, 1869 (aged 48) Rome, Papal States

Martial-Guillaume-Marie Testard du Cosquer (September 22, 1820 – July 27, 1869) was a French prelate of the Catholic Church who served as the first Archbishop of Port-au-Prince (1863-1869).

== Biography ==
Born in Lesneven, Brittany, du Cosquer was the son of Benjamin Martial Testard du Cosquer and Marie Désirée Goury. After graduating from the royal college of Pontivy in 1838, he studied at the Faculty of Law of Paris and earned a doctorate in 1841. He studied for the priesthood at the Pontifical Gregorian University in Rome, where he was ordained on April 22, 1848.

While in Rome, he served as a chaplain to the French troops under General Charles Oudinot during the 1849 siege of the city and was subsequently awarded the Legion of Honour. Following his return to France, he taught history and Scripture at the seminary of the Diocese of Quimper and briefly served as vicar general of the Diocese of Basse-Terre (1851). From 1857 to 1861, he served as the first pastor of Saint-Louis Church in Brest.

Following the concordat between the Vatican and Haiti in 1860, du Cosquer was appointed Apostolic Delegate to Haiti on November 29, 1861. In this role, he was entrusted with implementing the concordat and establishing new dioceses in the country. He briefly returned to Rome and was named the first Archbishop of Port-au-Prince on September 7, 1863. He received his episcopal consecration in Rome on the following October 18 from Cardinal Costantino Patrizi Naro, with Bishop Carlo Belgrado and Archbishop Alessandro Franchi serving as co-consecrators.

Upon his return to Haiti on June 10, 1864, du Cosquer received a warm welcome and visited President Fabre Geffrard, to whom he presented the insignia of the Order of St. Gregory the Great as a gift from Pope Pius IX. During his tenure, he founded the Petit Séminaire Collège Saint-Martial in 1865. The seminary was critically important for the young archdiocese, as many of the European missionaries who came to Haiti soon died from disease.

When Sylvain Salnave overthrew President Geffrard in 1867, he sent du Cosquer in exile to Rome. He died there two years later from typhoid fever.
