= Joseph Serge Miot =

Haitian archbishop (1946–2010)

The Most Reverend Joseph Serge Miot
- Archbishop of Port-au-Prince
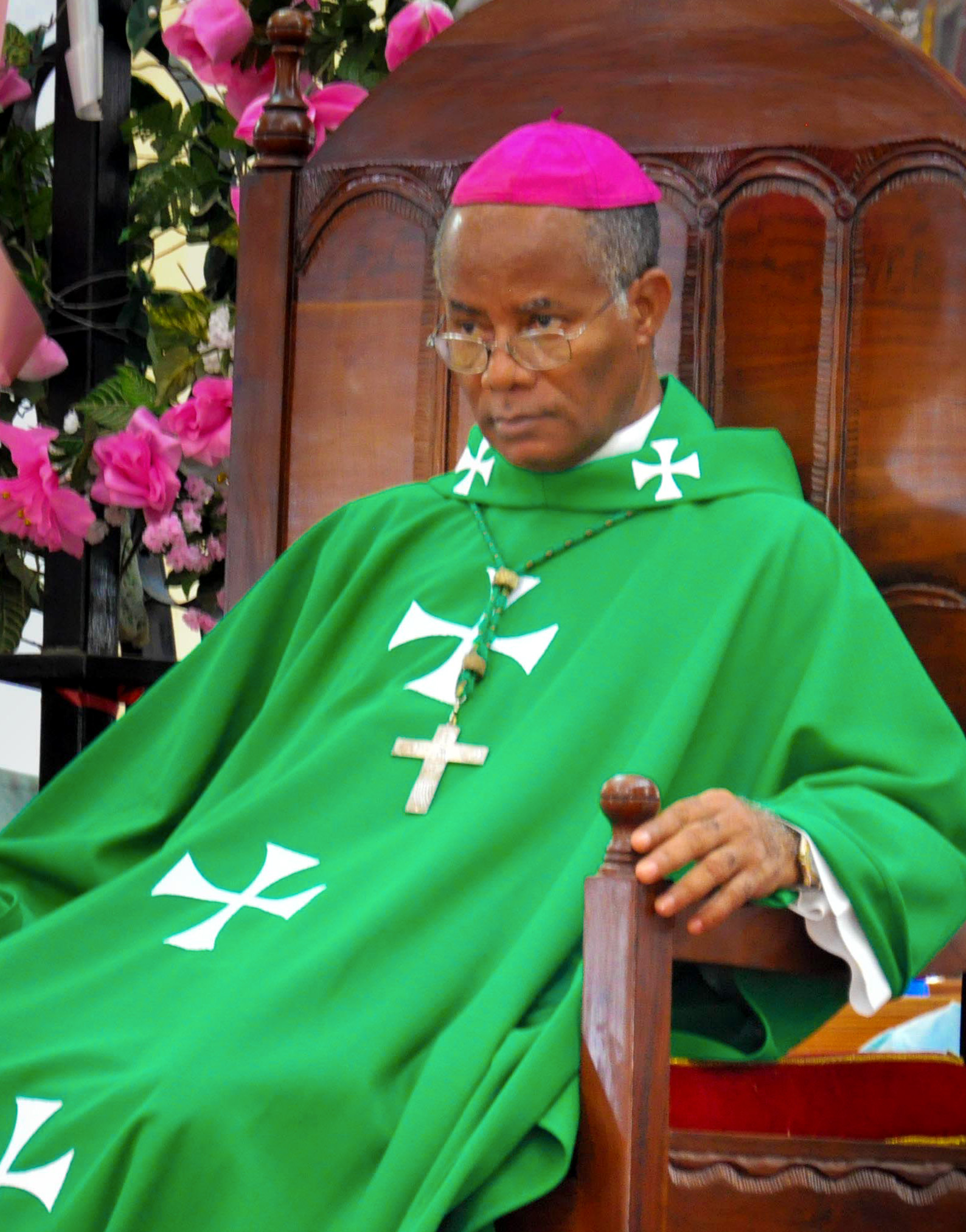
- Province: Port-au-Prince
- Diocese: Port-au-Prince
- Installed: 1 March 2008
- Term ended: 12 January 2010
- Predecessor: François-Wolff Ligondé
- Successor: Guire Poulard

Orders
- Ordination: 4 July 1975
- Consecration: October 12, 1997 by Christophe Pierre, François Gayot, and François-Wolff Ligondé

Personal details
- Born: 23 November 1946 Jérémie, Haiti
- Died: 12 January 2010 (aged 63) Port-au-Prince, Haiti
- Buried: Lilavois Cemetery
- Denomination: Catholic Church

Ordination history of Joseph Serge Miot
History
Episcopal consecration
- Consecrated by: Christophe Pierre
Episcopal succession
Bishops consecrated by Joseph Serge Miot as principal consecrator
- Joseph Gontrand Décoste: 18 October 2009

Joseph Serge Miot (French: [ʒozɛf sɛʁʒ mjo]; 23 November 1946 – 12 January 2010) was a Haitian Catholic prelate who served as the archbishop of Port-au-Prince from 2008 until his death in the 2010 Haiti earthquake.

== Biography ==
Miot was born in Jérémie, Grand'Anse on 23 November 1946. He was ordained to the priesthood on 4 July 1975 in the Diocese of Jérémie.

On 29 July 1997, he was appointed Coadjutor Archbishop of Port-au-Prince by Pope John Paul II. Archbishop Miot received his episcopal consecration on the following 12 October from Archbishop Christophe Pierre, with Archbishops François Gayot, SMM, and François-Wolff Ligondé serving as co-consecrators.

During his tenure, he denounced the incarceration of Fr. Gérard Jean-Juste by the government of Prime Minister Gérard Latortue.

Miot succeeded Ligondé, becoming the ninth archbishop of Port-au-Prince upon the latter's retirement on 1 March 2008.

The Port-au-Prince Cathedral, archdiocese offices, and many other churches were destroyed by the earthquake on 12 January 2010. Miot was killed instantly when the force of the quake threw him head-first off his balcony at the papal nunciature. Archbishop Bernardito Auza, Apostolic Nuncio to Haiti, the Apostolic Administrator of the Archdiocese, said that he originally sought an immediate burial for Miot, but that it would have conflicted with local tradition. Miot was buried at Lilavois Cemetery on 23 January 2010 immediately after his funeral Mass. Celebrants presiding at the funeral Mass included Cardinal Timothy Dolan, Archbishop of New York and chairman of the board of Catholic Relief Services; Thomas Wenski, Bishop of Orlando; and Archbishop Bernardito Auza.

Catholic Church titles
Preceded by François-Wolff Ligondé	Archbishop of Port-au-Prince; 2008–2010	Succeeded by Guire Poulard
