= Désinord Jean =

Haitian clergyman and bishop

- Bishop of Hinche
- Church: Catholic Church
- Diocese: Diocese of Hinche
- Appointed: 4 April 2016
- Predecessor: Simon-Pierre Saint-Hillien

Orders
- Ordination: 13 November 1994 by Joseph Lafontant
- Consecration: 2 July 2016 by Chibly Langlois

Personal details
- Born: 26 September 1967 (age 58) Furcy, Haiti

Désinord Jean (born September 26, 1967 in Furcy) is a Haitian clergyman and bishop for the Roman Catholic Diocese of Hinche, Haiti. He was ordained in 1994 and was appointed as a bishop in 2016.

== See also ==
- Catholic Church in Haiti
