= Joseph Willy Romélus =

Haitian Roman Catholic bishop (1931–2025)

His Excellency Joseph Willy Romélus
- Bishop Emeritus of Jérémie
- Archdiocese: Port-au-Prince
- Diocese: Jérémie
- Appointed: 26 April 1977
- Term ended: 6 August 2009
- Predecessor: Carl-Édouard Peters
- Successor: Joseph Gontrand Décoste

Orders
- Ordination: 13 July 1958
- Consecration: 26 June 1977 by François-Wolff Ligondé

Personal details
- Born: 17 January 1931 Arniquet, Haiti
- Died: 12 August 2025 (aged 94) Arniquet, Haiti

Joseph Willy Romélus (17 January 1931 – 12 August 2025) was a Haitian bishop who was bishop emeritus of the Roman Catholic Diocese of Jérémie, located in the city of Jérémie, from 2009 until his death.

== Life and work ==
Romélus was born in Arniquet on 17 January 1931. He was ordained a priest on 13 July 1958 for the diocese of Les Cayes.

On 26 April 1977, he was appointed bishop of Jérémie. He was consecrated on the following 26 June by François-Wolff Ligondé, Archbishop of Port-au-Prince.

Romélus retired on 6 August 2009 at the age of 78, and died on 12 August 2025, at the age of 94.

Catholic Church titles
Preceded by Carl-Édouard Peters	Bishop of Jérémie; 1977–2009	Succeeded by Joseph Gontrand Décoste
