= Apostolic Nunciature to Haiti =

Diplomatic Mission of the Holy See in Haiti

- Location: Port-au-Prince, Haiti
- Coordinates: 18°30′29″N 72°17′50″W
- Apostolic Nuncio: Archbishop Francisco Escalante Molina

The Apostolic Nunciature to Haiti is the diplomatic mission of the Holy See to Haiti. It is located in Port-au-Prince. The current apostolic nuncio is Archbishop Jude Thaddeus Okolo, who was named to the position by Pope Leo XIV on 11 February 2026.

The Apostolic Nunciature to the Republic of Haiti is an ecclesiastical office of the Catholic Church in Haiti, with the rank of an embassy. The nuncio serves both as the ambassador of the Holy See to the President of Haiti, and as delegate and point-of-contact between the Catholic hierarchy in Haiti and the Pope.

== Representatives of the Holy See to Haiti ==
Apostolic delegates

- Joseph Rosati (30 April 1841 – 25 September 1843)
- Giovanni Monetti (30 October 1860 – 1861)
- Martial-Guillaume-Marie Testard du Cosquer (29 November 1861 – 1 October 1863)
- Rocco Cocchia (28 July 1874 – 9 August 1883)
- Bernardino di Milia (13 May 1884 – November 1890)
- Spiridion-Salvatore-Costantino Buhadgiar (28 November 1890 – 10 August 1891)
- Giulio Tonti (10 August 1892 – 21 July 1902)

Apostolic internuncios

- Francesco Cherubini (13 November 1915 – 2 March 1920)
- George Joseph Caruana (28 January 1927 – September 1930)

Apostolic nuncios

- Giuseppe Fietta (23 September 1930 – 24 July 1936) (Note: De Marchi dates Fietta's appointment as Nuncio to Argentina to 20 June 1936, but AAS records that assignment as of 12 August 1936, following Silvani's appointment as Nuncio to Haiti.)
- Maurilio Silvani (24 July 1936 – 23 May 1942)
- Alfredo Pacini (23 April 1946 – 23 April 1949)
- Francesco Lardone (21 May 1949 – 21 November 1953)
- Luigi Raimondi (24 December 1953 – 15 December 1956)
- Domenico Enrici (30 January 1958 – 5 January 1960)
- Giovanni Ferrofino (8 February 1960 – 3 November 1965)
- Marie-Joseph Lemieux (16 September 1966 – 30 May 1969)
- Luigi Barbarito (10 June 1969 – 5 April 1975)
- Luigi Conti (1 August 1975 – 19 November 1983)
- Paolo Romeo (17 December 1983 – 24 April 1990)
- Giuseppe Leanza (3 July 1990 – 4 June 1991)
- Lorenzo Baldisseri (15 January 1992 – 6 April 1995)
- Christophe Pierre (12 July 1995 – 10 May 1999)
- Luigi Bonazzi (19 June 1999 – 30 March 2004)
- Mario Giordana (27 April 2004 – 15 March 2008)
- Bernardito Auza (8 May 2008 – 1 July 2014)
- Eugene Nugent (10 January 2015 – 7 January 2021)
- Francisco Escalante Molina (4 June 2021 – 25 January 2024)
- Jude Thaddeus Okolo (11 February 2026 – present)

== See also ==
- Roman Catholicism in Haiti
- Religion in Haiti
