= Chibly Langlois =

Haitian Catholic cardinal

His Eminence Chibly Langlois
- Cardinal, Bishop of Les Cayes
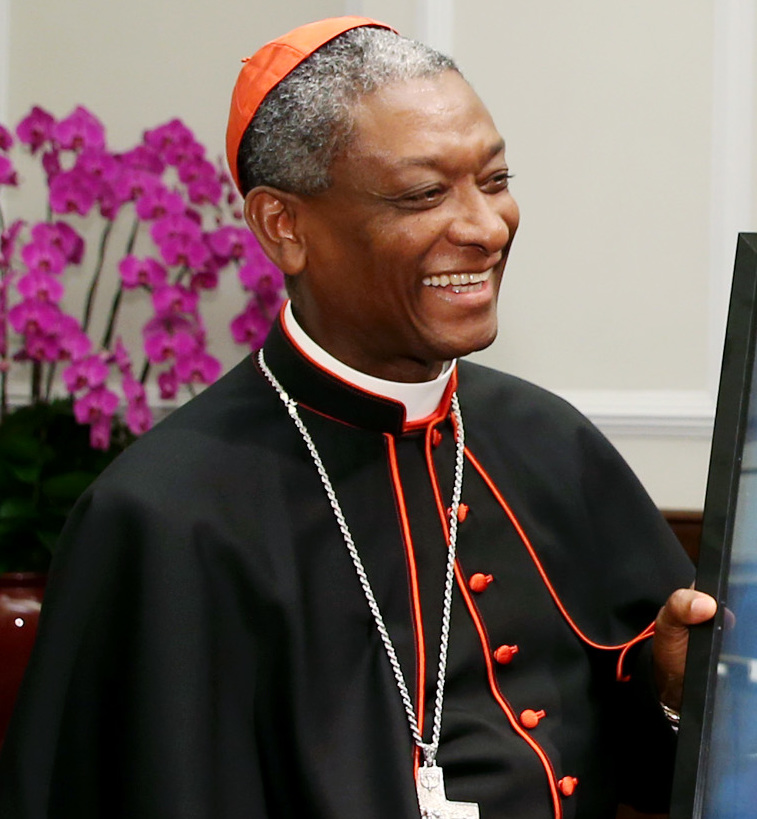
- Langlois in 2015
- Church: Latin Church
- Diocese: Les Cayes
- Appointed: 15 August 2011
- Predecessor: Guire Poulard
- Other post: Cardinal-Priest of San Giacomo in Augusta, President of Episcopal Conference of Haiti
- Previous post: Bishop of Fort-Liberté (2004-2011)

Orders
- Ordination: 22 September 1991 by Guire Poulard
- Consecration: 6 June 2004 by Hubert Constant
- Created cardinal: 22 February 2014 by Pope Francis
- Rank: Cardinal-Priest

Personal details
- Born: November 29, 1958 (age 67) La Vallée-de-Jacmel, Haiti
- Denomination: Roman Catholic
- Motto: Servir Dieu et l'homme dans l'amour (Serve God and humanity in love)
- Coat of arms

Styles of Chibly Langlois
- Reference style: His Eminence
- Spoken style: Your Eminence
- Religious style: Cardinal
- Informal style: Cardinal

Ordination history of Chibly Langlois
History
Priestly ordination
- Date: 22 September 1991
Episcopal consecration
- Principal consecrator: Hubert Constant, OMI
- Co-consecrators: Guire Poulard; Joseph Serge Miot
- Date: 6 June 2004
Cardinalate
- Elevated by: Pope Francis
- Date: 22 February 2014
Episcopal succession
Bishops consecrated by Chibly Langlois as principal consecrator
- David Thomas Daniel Macaire, O.P.: 12 April 2015
- Jean Désinord: 2 July 2016

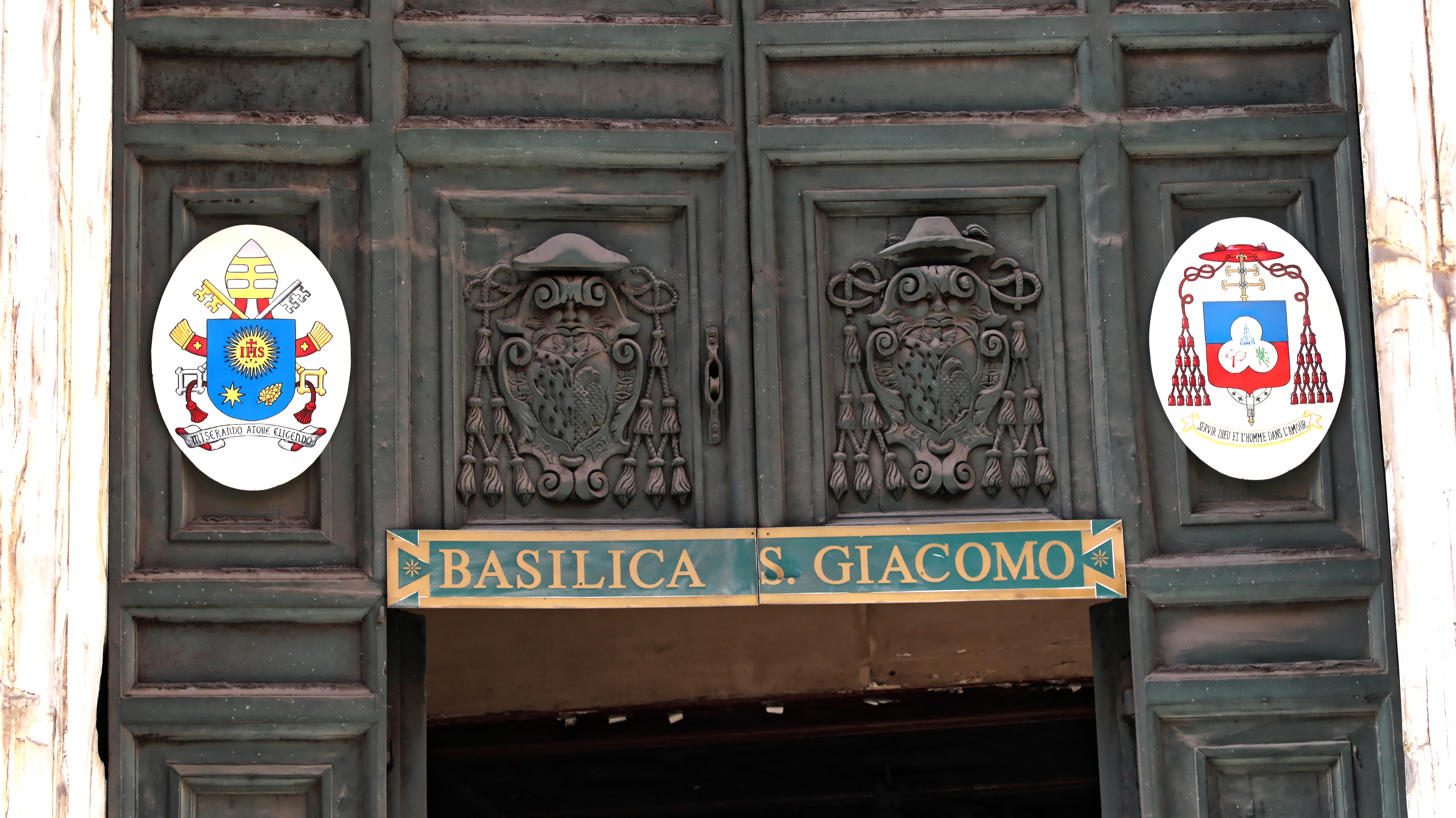
Door of San Giacomo in Augusta, Rome, with plaques displaying the arms of Pope Francis (left) and those of Cardinal Langlois (right). (Despite the sign, San Giacomo is not actually a basilica.)

Chibly Langlois (French pronunciation: [lɑ̃glwa]; born 29 November 1958) is a Haitian Catholic prelate who has served as Bishop of Les Cayes since 2011. He is also president of the Haitian Bishops’ Conference.

Pope Francis elevated Langlois to the College of Cardinals on 22 February 2014. As of February 2023, Langlois is the first and only Haitian cardinal in history. He was the only new cardinal elevated in the February 2014 consistory who was not an archbishop.

== Biography ==
Langlois was born in 1958 in La Vallée in southeast Haiti to a poor family. Langlois entered the Grand Séminaire Notre-Dame of Port-au-Prince in 1985, where he studied philosophy and theology. From 1994 to 1996, he studied at the Pontifical Lateran University in Rome and obtained a licentiate in pastoral theology.

He was ordained as priest for the diocese of Jacmel on 22 September 1991.

On 8 April 2004, Langlois was appointed Bishop of Fort-Liberté by Pope John Paul II. On 15 August 2011 he was appointed Bishop of Les Cayes by Pope Benedict XVI.

When choosing to elevate Langlois to the College of Cardinals in 2014, Pope Francis bypassed many more senior Haitian bishops, including metropolitan archbishops Louis Kébreau and Guire Poulard. At the time, Poulard was Langlois's metropolitan in the ecclesiastical province of Port-au-Prince.

On 22 February 2014, Pope Francis appointed Langlois Cardinal-Priest of San Giacomo in Augusta. This Roman church had never before been designated as the titular church of a Catholic cardinal. Langlois took possession of his titular church on 7 June 2014. As of April 2025, Langlois is the first and only Haitian cardinal in history.

On 22 May 2014, Pope Francis appointed Cardinal Langlois a member of both the Pontifical Council for Justice and Peace, Pontifical Commission for Latin America, and Secretariat for Communications. He is also president of the Haitian Bishops’ Conference.

Langlois was injured during the 2021 Haiti earthquake. He was at the bishop's residence when it partially collapsed during the quake. Langlois survived, but a priest and two employees were killed. On June 8, 2022, Langlois was injured in a serious car accident.

Langlois participated as a cardinal elector in the 2025 papal conclave that elected Pope Leo XIV.

== See also ==
- Cardinals created by Francis

Catholic Church titles
Preceded by Hubert Constant, OMI	Bishop of Fort-Liberte; 2004-2011	Succeeded by Max Leroy Mesidor
Preceded by Guire Poulard	Bishop of Les Cayes; 2011–present	Incumbent
Preceded by titular church established	Cardinal Priest of San Giacomo in Augusta; 2014–present	Incumbent
