= St. Joseph's Cathedral, Fort-Liberté =

Coordinates: 19.6666°N 71.8403°W

St. Joseph's Cathedral
- Cathédrale Saint-Joseph
- St. Joseph's Cathedral
- Location: Fort-Liberté
- Country: Haiti
- Denomination: Roman Catholic Church

Administration
- Diocese: Roman Catholic Diocese of Fort-Liberté

The St. Joseph's Cathedral (French: Cathédrale Saint-Joseph; Cathédrale Saint-Joseph de Fort-Liberté) also called Fort-Liberté Cathedral is a religious building belonging to the Catholic Church and is located in the city of Fort-Liberté (freedom Fort or Fòlibète in Haitian Creole), capital of the northeastern department (Département Nord-Est) in the Caribbean country of Haiti.

The cathedral follows the Roman or Latin Rite serves as the seat of the Bishop of the Diocese of Fort-Liberté (Latin: Dioecesis Castelli Libertatis). Work for its original construction was completed in 1703.

It is under the pastoral responsibility of the Bishop Quesnel Alphonse.

== See also ==
- List of cathedrals in Haiti
- Roman Catholicism in Haiti
- St. Joseph's Cathedral (disambiguation)
