= Launay Saturné =

Haitian clergyman and bishop

- Archbishop of Cap-Haïtien
- Church: Catholic Church
- Archdiocese: Archdiocese of Cap-Haïtien
- Appointed: 16 July 2018
- Predecessor: Max Leroy Mésidor
- Previous post: Bishop of Jacmel (2010-2018)

Orders
- Ordination: 10 March 1991 by Joseph Lafontant
- Consecration: 29 May 2010 by Bernardito Auza

Personal details
- Born: 14 January 1964 (age 62) Petit-Goâve, Ouest, Haiti

Launay Saturné (born 1964 in Petit-Goâve) is a Haitian Catholic prelate who has served as Archbishop of Cap-Haïtien since 2019. He was previously Bishop of Jacmel from 2010 to 2019.
