= Archdiocese of Port-au-Prince =

Roman Catholic metropolitan archdiocese in Port-au-Prince, Haiti

Coordinates: 18.5492°N 72.3391°W

Archdiocese of Port-au-Prince Archidioecesis Portus Principis Archidiocèse de Port-au-Prince Achidyosèz Pòtoprens
- The Cathedral of Our Lady of the Assumption in Port-au-Prince, which was dedicated on 13 December 1928, was destroyed during the 12 January 2010 earthquake

Location
- Country: Haiti
- Ecclesiastical province: Province of Port-au-Prince
- Metropolitan: Port-au-Prince, Port-au-Prince Arrondissement, Ouest

Statistics
- Area: 5,500 km^{2} (2,100 sq mi)
- Population: Total; Catholics: (as of 2013); 4,244,000; 3,056,000 (72%)
- Parishes: 89

Information
- Denomination: Catholic
- Rite: Roman Rite
- Established: October 3, 1861
- Cathedral: The Cathedral of Our Lady of the Assumption

Current leadership
- Pope: Leo XIV
- Archbishop: Max Leroy Mésidor
- Bishops emeritus: Joseph Lafontant

Website
- www.archidiocesedepaup.org

The Archdiocese of Port-au-Prince (Latin: Archidioecesis Portus Principis; French: Archidiocèse de Port-au-Prince; Haitian Creole: Achidyosèz Pòtoprens) is a metropolitan archdiocese, responsible for the suffragan dioceses of Jacmel, Jérémie, Anse-à-Veau and Miragoâne and Les Cayes. There are approximately 668,700 Catholics in the archdiocese and the clergy have been primarily French since its inception in 1861.

The archdiocese was a vacant see following the death of Archbishop Joseph Serge Miot, who was killed in the 12 January 2010 earthquake when the Archdiocesan Chancery building collapsed. The archdiocese's chancellor was also reportedly killed.

On the one-year anniversary of the disaster, Pope Benedict XVI named Guire Poulard - who had been the Bishop of Les Cayes - as the new Archbishop of Port-au-Prince. At the same time he named Glandas Marie Erick Toussaint as the auxiliary Bishop of the Archdiocese.

== Bishops ==
=== Ordinaries ===
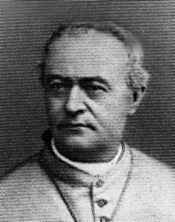
Mgr. Guilloux, 2nd Archbishop

1. Martial-Guillaume-Marie Testard du Cosquer (7 September 1863 – 27 July 1869)
2. Alexis-Jean-Marie Guilloux (27 June 1870 – 24 October 1885)
3. Constant-Mathurin Hillion (10 June 1886 – 21 February 1890)
4. Cardinal Giulio Tonti (1 October 1894 – 23 August 1902), appointed titular Archbishop
5. Julien-Jean-Guillaume Conan (16 September 1903 – 5 December 1930)
6. Joseph-Marie Le Gouaze (5 December 1930 – 24 June 1955)
7. François-Marie-Joseph Poirier (3 July 1955 – 18 August 1966)
8. François-Wolff Ligondé (20 August 1966 – 1 March 2008)
9. Joseph Serge Miot (1 March 2008 – 12 January 2010)
10. Guire Poulard (12 January 2011 – 7 October 2017)
11. Max Leroy Mésidor (7 October 2017 – present)

=== Coadjutor bishop ===
- Jules-Victor-Marie Pichon (1905-1919), did not succeed to see; appointed Archbishop (Personal Title) of Les Cayes
- Joseph-Marie Le Gouaze (1927-1930)
- Joseph Serge Miot (1997-2008)

=== Auxiliary bishops ===
- Léon Jules Marie Bélouino (1880-1882)
- François-Marie Kersuzan (1883-1886), appointed Bishop of Cap-Haitien
- Pierre-Marie Gentet (1895-1896)
- Rémy Jérôme Augustin, S.M.M. (1953-1966), appointed Coadjutor Bishop of Port-de-Paix
- Jean-Baptiste Décoste (1966-1972), appointed Bishop of Hinche
- Louis Nerval Kébreau, S.D.B. (1986-1998), appointed Bishop of Hinche
- Joseph Lafontant (1986-2018)
- Simon-Pierre Saint-Hillien, C.S.C. (2002-2009), appointed Bishop of Hinche
- Pierre-André Dumas (2002-2008), appointed Bishop of Anse-à-Veau et Miragoâne
- Quesnel Alphonse, S.M.M. (2012-2014), appointed Bishop of Fort-Liberté
- Sylvain Ducange, S.D.B. (2016–2021), died

=== Other priests of this diocese who became bishops ===
- Launay Saturné, appointed Bishop of Jacmel in 2010
- Désinord Jean, appointed Bishop of Hinche in 2016

== Other bishops ==
=== Former auxiliary bishops ===
- Léon Bélouino (20 August 1880 – 18 January 1882)
- Sylvain Ducange, SDB (4 June 2016 - 18 June 2021)
- François-Marie Kersuzan (9 August 1883 – 13 August 1886)
- Pierre-Marie Gentet (10 December 1895 – 6 March 1896)
- Jules-Victor-Marie Pichon (Coadjutor: 13 January 1905 – 18 December 1919)
- Rémy Augustin, SMM (8 April 1953 – 20 August 1966)
- Jean-Baptiste Décoste (20 August 1966 – 20 April 1972)
- Louis Nerval Kébreau, SDB (25 November 1986 – 30 June 1998)
- Joseph Lafontant (25 November 1986 – 27 July 2013)
- Pierre-André Dumas (10 December 2002 – 13 July 2008)
- Simon-Pierre Saint-Hillien, CSC (10 December 2002 – 6 August 2009)
- Glandas Marie Erick Toussaint (12 January 2011 – 8 December 2018)
- Quesnel Alphonse, SMM (10 November 2012 – 25 October 2014)

=== Bishops who were priests of the archdiocese ===
- Launay Saturné (priest: 10 March 1991 – 28 April 2010; appointed Bishop of Jacmel)
- Jean Désinord (priest: 13 November 1994 – 4 April 2016; appointed Bishop of Hinche)

== See also ==
- List of Catholic dioceses in Haiti

== External links and references ==
- "Archdiocese of Port-au-Prince". Catholic-Hierarchy.
- Herbermann, Charles, ed. (1913). "Archdiocese of Port-au-Prince" . Catholic Encyclopedia. New York: Robert Appleton Company.
- GCatholic.org page for the Archdiocese of Port-au-Prince
- Official website for the Archdiocese of Port-au-Prince
- RadioSoleil.org in Port-au-Prince
