= Jean-Marie-Alexandre Morice =

Jean-Marie-Alexandre Morice (born 1852 in Loyat) was a French clergyman and bishop for the Roman Catholic Diocese of Les Cayes. He was ordained in 1875. He was appointed bishop in 1893. He died in 1934.
