= Julien-Jean-Guillaume Conan =

French clergyman

- Archbishop of Port-au-Prince
- Church: Catholic Church
- Archdiocese: Archdiocese of Port-au-Prince
- In office: 22 October 1903 – 5 December 1930
- Predecessor: Giulio Tonti
- Successor: Joseph-Marie Le Gouaze
- Other post: Titular Archbishop of Seleucia in Isauria (1930-1944)

Orders
- Consecration: 13 December 1903 by François-Marie Kersuzan

Personal details
- Born: 18 June 1860 Guern, Morbihan, French Empire
- Died: 11 October 1944 (aged 84)

Julien-Jean-Guillaume Conan (born 18 June 1860 in Guern – died 11 October 1944) was a French clergyman and Archbishop of the Roman Catholic Archdiocese of Port-au-Prince. He was ordained in 1903. He was appointed bishop in 1903. He died in 1944.
