= Giulio Tonti =

Italian Cardinal

His Eminence Giulio Tonti
- Prefect of the Congregation for Religious
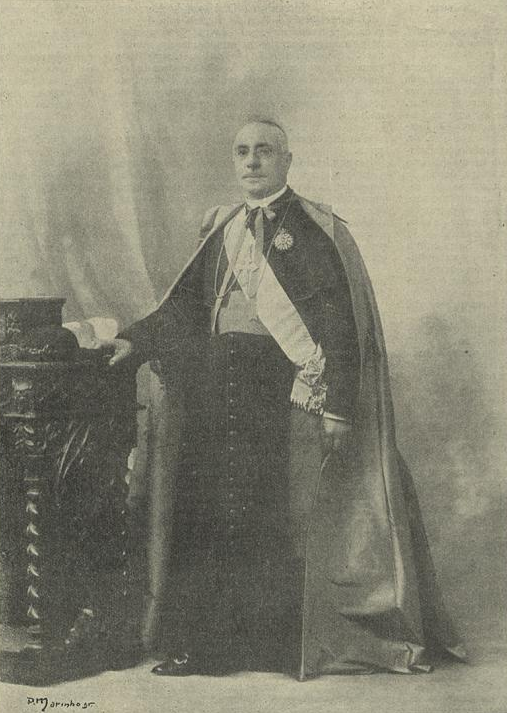
- Tonti pictured in Lisbon on 30 November 1906.
- Church: Roman Catholic Church
- Appointed: 13 February 1907
- Term ended: 11 December 1918
- Predecessor: Diomede Falconio
- Successor: Raffaele Scapinelli di Leguigno
- Other post: Cardinal-Priest of Santi Silvestro e Martino ai Monti (1915–18)
- Previous posts: Titular Bishop of Samos (1892–93); Apostolic Delegate to Venezuela (1892–94); Apostolic Administrator of Port-au-Prince (1893–94); Apostolic Administrator of Les Gonaïves (1893–1902); Titular Archbishop of Sardes (1893–94); Archbishop of Port-au-Prince (1894–1902); Apostolic Nuncio to Brazil (1902–06); Titular Archbishop of Ancyra (1902–15); Apostolic Nuncio to Portugal (1906–15)

Orders
- Ordination: 21 December 1867
- Consecration: 25 July 1892 by Vincenzo Vannutelli
- Created cardinal: 6 December 1915 by Pope Benedict XV
- Rank: Cardinal-Priest

Personal details
- Born: Giulio Tonti; 9 December 1844 Rome, Papal States
- Died: 11 December 1918 (aged 74) Rome, Kingdom of Italy
- Buried: Campo Verano
- Education: Pontifical Roman Seminary
- Motto: Iustitiae et pax osculante sunt

Styles of Giulio Tonti
- Reference style: His Eminence
- Spoken style: Your Eminence
- Informal style: Cardinal
- See: Port-au-Prince (emeritus)

Giulio Tonti (9 December 1844 – 11 December 1918) was an Italian Cardinal of the Roman Catholic Church who served as Prefect of the Sacred Congregation of Religious from 1917 until his death, and was elevated to the cardinalate in 1915.

== Biography ==
Giulio Tonti was born in Rome, and received the Sacrament of Confirmation on 17 August 1856. He studied at the Pontifical Roman Seminary, from where he obtained his doctorates in philosophy, in theology, and in canon and civil law.

Tonti was ordained to the priesthood on 21 December 1867, and then served as professor of theology and vice-rector of the Pontifical Urbanian Athenaeum De Propaganda Fide until 1879. He became an official of the Sacred Congregation of Extraordinary Ecclesiastical Affairs in the Roman Curia before serving as auditor of the nunciature to France (1879–1882) and to Portugal (1882–1892). He was raised to the honorary rank of Privy Chamberlain of His Holiness as well.

On 11 July 1892, Tonti was appointed Apostolic Delegate to Santo Domingo, Haiti, and Venezuela and Titular Archbishop of Samos by Pope Leo XIII. He received his episcopal consecration on the following 25 July from Cardinal Vincenzo Vannutelli, with Bishops Michele dei Baroni Zezza Zaponetta and Augusto Berlucca serving as co-consecrators. He was later named Apostolic Administrator of Port-au-Prince and of Les Gonaïves on 24 February 1893, and Titular Archbishop of Sardes on the following 15 July.

Archbishop Tonti rose to become Archbishop of Port-au-Prince, whilst retaining the administration of the Diocese of Les Gonaïves, on 1 October 1894. He was then appointed Nuncio to Brazil and Titular Archbishop of Ancyra on 23 August 1902, and Nuncio to Portugal on 4 October 1906. On 25 October 1910, Tonti resigned his diplomatic post in Portugal as a result of the country's revolution, and returned to Rome.

Pope Benedict XV created him Cardinal-Priest of Ss. Silvestro e Martino ai Monti in the consistory of 6 December 1915. He was later named Prefect of the Sacred Congregation of Religious on 13 February 1917, also becoming a member of the Council for the Administration of the Wealth of the Apostolic See on 21 May of that same year.

Tonti died in his native Rome, at two days after his 74th birthday. He is buried in the tomb of the chapter of St. Peter's Basilica at the Campo Verano cemetery in Rome.

Preceded by Spiridion-Salvatore-Costantino Buhadgiar	Apostolic Delegate to Santo Domingo, Haiti, and Venezuela; 1892–1893	Succeeded by Francesco Marchetti Selvaggiani
Preceded by Constant-Mathurin Hillion	Archbishop of Port-au-Prince; 1893–1902	Succeeded by Julien-Jean-Guillaume Conan
Preceded by José Macchi	Nuncio to Brazil; 1902–1906	Succeeded by Alessandro Bavona
Preceded by José Macchi	Apostolic Nuncio to Portugal; 1906–1910	Succeeded by Achille Locatelli
Preceded by Diomede Falconio, OFM	Prefect of the Sacred Congregation of Religious; 1917–1918	Succeeded by Raffaele Scapinelli di Léguigno
