= Joseph-Marie Le Gouaze =

French clergyman

- Archbishop of Port-au-Prince
- Church: Catholic Church
- Archdiocese: Archdiocese of Port-au-Prince
- In office: 5 December 1930 – 24 June 1955
- Predecessor: Julien-Jean-Guillaume Conan
- Successor: François-Marie-Joseph Poirier
- Other post: Titular Archbishop of Anazarbus (1955-1964)
- Previous posts: Titular Archbishop of Dara (1927-1930); Coadjutor Archbishop of Port-au-Prince (1927-1930)

Orders
- Ordination: 6 July 1907
- Consecration: 18 December 1927 by Julien-Jean-Guillaume Conan

Personal details
- Born: 1 October 1883 Saint-Thuriau, Morbihan, France
- Died: 31 July 1964 (aged 80)

Joseph-Marie Le Gouaze (born 1 October 1883 in Saint-Thuriau – died 31 July 1964) was a French clergyman and Archbishop of the Roman Catholic Archdiocese of Port-au-Prince. He was ordained in 1907. He was appointed bishop in 1930. He died in 1964.
