= François-Marie-Joseph Poirier =

French clergyman

- Archbishop of Port-au-Prince
- Church: Catholic Church
- Archdiocese: Archdiocese of Port-au-Prince
- In office: 3 July 1955 – 18 August 1966
- Predecessor: Joseph-Marie Le Gouaze
- Successor: François-Wolff Ligondé
- Other post: Titular Archbishop of Lemnus (1966-1976)

Orders
- Ordination: 16 July 1928
- Consecration: 20 November 1955 by Luigi Raimondi

Personal details
- Born: 24 November 1904 Néant-sur-Yvel, Morbihan, France
- Died: 20 January 1976 (aged 71)

François-Marie-Joseph Poirier (born 24 November 1904 in Néant-sur-Yvel – died 20 January 1976) was a French clergyman and Archbishop of the Roman Catholic Archdiocese of Port-au-Prince. He was ordained in 1928. He was appointed bishop in 1955. He died in 1976.
