= Antonio Maria Buhagiar =

Maltese prelate

Antonio Maria Buhagiar OFM Cap
- Apostolic Delegate to the Dominican Republic, Haiti and Venezuela
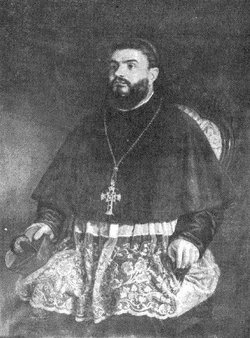
- Church: Catholic Church
- In office: 28 November 1890 – 10 August 1891
- Predecessor: Bernardino di Milia
- Successor: Giulio Tonti
- Other post: Titular Bishop of Ruspae (1884-1891)
- Previous posts: Apostolic Administrator of Malta (1885-1889); Vicar Apostolic of Tunis (1884)

Orders
- Consecration: 31 August 1884 by Charles Lavigerie

Personal details
- Born: Spiridion Salvatore Constantino Buhagiar; 19 November 1846 Cephalonia, United States of the Ionian Islands, British Empire
- Died: 10 August 1891 (aged 44) Santo Domingo, Dominican Republic

Antonio Maria Buhagiar, OFM Cap, born Spiridion Salvatore Constantino Buhagiar or Buhadgiar (19 November 1846 – 10 August 1891) was a prelate of the Catholic Church of Maltese heritage who led ecclesiastical jurisdictions in Tunisia and Malta and also worked briefly in the diplomatic service of the Holy See just before he died.

== Biography ==
Buhagiar was born to a family of immigrants from Malta on 19 November 1846 in Cephalonia, Greece. He joined the Order of Friars Minor Capuchin in Malta on 20 December 1863 and was ordained a priest on 18 September 1869.

In 1872 he began twelve years of pastoral work as a missionary in Sfax, Tunisia. He survived the July 1881 siege of Sfax, when the city revolted against the establishment of the French protectorate in Tunisia.

On 12 August 1884, Pope Leo XIII named him Vicar Apostolic of Tunis and titular bishop of Ruspe. He received his episcopal consecration on 31 August 1884 from Charles-Martial-Allemand Lavigerie, Archbishop of Algiers. He became auxiliary bishop in November 1884 when the vicariate became the Archdiocese of Carthage with Archbishop Lavigerie at its head.

On 14 April 1885, Pope Leo named him Apostolic Administrator of the Archdiocese of Malta, with the consent of the British officials governing Malta who conveyed Buhagiar to Valletta aboard the British warship HMS Helicon. There he issued a warning to Catholics against joining the Primrose League, a non-sectarian conservative organization combatting "anarchy and atheism". He wrote: "Its object is religious, but as it was not born within the fold nor approved by the Church, ... it may prove dangerous for Catholics to belong to an association whose creed essentially differs from ours".

He held that post until the appointment of Pietro Pace, a Maltese native preferred by the British to Buhagiar with his long history with the French, as Bishop of Malta on 11 February 1889.

On 28 November 1890, Pope Leo appointed him Apostolic Delegate to the Dominican Republic, Haiti, and Venezuela.

Buhagiar died of yellow fever in Santo Domingo on 10 August 1891 at the age of 44.
