= Jean-Baptiste Décoste =

Haitian clergyman and bishop

- Bishop of Hinche
- Church: Catholic Church
- Diocese: Diocese of Hinche
- In office: 20 April 1972 – 20 May 1980
- Predecessor: Diocese erected
- Successor: Léonard Pétion Laroche
- Previous posts: Titular Bishop of Sigus (1966-1972); Auxiliary Bishop of Port-au-Prince (1966-1972)

Orders
- Ordination: 8 March 1952
- Consecration: 28 October 1966 by Antonio Samorè

Personal details
- Born: 3 February 1925 Saint-Louis-du-Sud, Sud, Haiti
- Died: 20 May 1980 (aged 55)

Jean-Baptiste Décoste (born 1925 in Saint-Louis-du-Sud - 1980) was a Haitian prelate, who served as a bishop of Roman Catholic Diocese of Hinche. He was ordained in 1952. He was appointed bishop in 1972. He died in 1980.
