= Diocese of Fort-Liberté =

Roman Catholic diocese in Haiti

Coordinates: 19.6666°N 71.8403°W

Diocese of Fort-Liberté Dioecesis Castelli Libertatis Cathédrale Saint-Joseph

Location
- Country: Haiti
- Ecclesiastical province: Province of Cap-Haïtien
- Metropolitan: Fort-Liberté

Statistics
- Area: 1,200 km^{2} (460 sq mi)
- Population: Total; Catholics: (as of 2006); 460,000; 331,200 (72%)
- Parishes: 25

Information
- Denomination: Roman Catholic
- Sui iuris church: Latin Church
- Rite: Roman Rite
- Established: 31 January 1991 (35 years ago)
- Cathedral: Cathedral of St. Joseph

Current leadership
- Pope: Leo XIV
- Bishop: Jean-Pierre Sander
- Bishops emeritus: Quesnel Alphonse, SMM

Website
- www.diocesedefortliberte.org

The Roman Catholic Diocese of Fort-Liberté (French: Diocèse catholique romain de Fort-Liberté; Latin: Romano-Catholicae Dioecesis Fort-Liberté), erected 31 January 1991, is a suffragan of the Archdiocese of Cap-Haïtien. On 25 October 2014, Pope Francis appointed Quesnel Alphonse, S.M.M. as bishop of Fort-Liberté.

== Ordinaries ==
- Hubert Constant, O.M.I. (1991-2003), appointed Archbishop of Cap-Haïtien
- Chibly Langlois (2004-2011), appointed Bishop of Les Cayes; future Cardinal
- Max Leroy Mésidor (2012-2013), appointed coadjutor archbishop of the Roman Catholic Archdiocese of Cap-Haïtien by Pope Francis on November 1, 2013
- Quesnel Alphonse, S.M.M. (2014–2026)
- Louis-Jean Sander (since 2026)

== See also ==
- Roman Catholicism in Haiti
- Fort-Liberté

== External links and references ==
- "Diocese of Fort-Liberté". Catholic-Hierarchy.
- GCatholic.org page for this diocese
