= Max Leroy Mésidor =

Haitian clergyman (born 1962)

His Excellency, The Most Reverend Max Leroy Mésidor
- Archbishop of Port-au-Prince
- Archdiocese: Archdiocese of Port-au-Prince
- Appointed: October 7, 2017
- Installed: January 6, 2018
- Predecessor: Guire Poulard
- Other posts: Former Bishop of Fort-Liberté, former Archbishop of Cap-Haïtien

Orders
- Ordination: January 10, 1988 by Emmanuel Constant
- Consecration: July 28, 2012 by Bernardito Auza, Chibly Langlois, and Yves-Marie Péan

Personal details
- Born: January 6, 1962 Saint-Marc, Haiti

Max Leroy Mésidor (French pronunciation: [maks ləʁwa mezidɔʁ]; born 1962 in Saint-Marc) is a Haitian clergyman of the Catholic Church who has served as Archbishop of Port-au-Prince since 2017.

== Biography ==
Mésidor began seminary in the Diocese of Les Gonaïves at the College of the Immaculate Conception, after which he entered the national major seminary in Port-au-Prince. He was ordained in 1988, after which he went to the University of Leuven in Belgium to study pastoral theology and catechesis.

In the Diocese of Les Gonaïves, he held positions at several parishes before becoming the vicar general in 2008.

In 2012, he was named the Bishop of Fort-Liberté.

On November 1, 2013, he was named as Coadjutor Archbishop of Cap-Haïtien and became the metropolitan archbishop on November 15, 2014.

On October 7, 2017, he was named the Archbishop of Port-au-Prince. He was installed on January 6, 2018.
