= Guire Poulard =

Haitian Roman Catholic archbishop

The Most Reverend Guire Poulard
- Archbishop-emeritus of Port au-Prince
- Archdiocese: Port-au-Prince
- See: Port-au-Prince
- Appointed: 12 January 2011
- Installed: 26 March 2011
- Term ended: 7 Oct 2017
- Predecessor: Joseph Serge Miot
- Successor: Max Leroy Mésidor

Orders
- Ordination: 25 June 1972 by François-Wolff Ligondé
- Consecration: 15 May 1988 by Paolo Romeo
- Rank: Archbishop

Personal details
- Born: 6 January 1942
- Died: 9 December 2018 (aged 76) Saint Francois de Sales Hospital, Port-au-Prince

Guire Poulard (6 January 1942 – 9 December 2018) was a Haitian Catholic prelate who served as Archbishop of Port-au-Prince from 2011 to 2017. He previously served as Bishop of Jacmel from 1988 to 2009 and Bishop of Les Cayes from 2009 to 2011.

== Biography ==
Poulard was born in Haiti and was ordained to the priesthood in 1972. He served as Bishop of Jacmel from 1988 to 2009. He then served as Bishop of Les Cayes from 2009 to 2011. Poulard served as Archbishop of Port-au-Prince from 2011 to 2017, succeeding Joseph Serge Miot, who died due to the 2010 Haiti earthquake.

His resignation was accepted by Pope Francis on 7 October 2017 due to reaching the age limit. The pope appointed Max Leroy Mésidor, until then Archbishop of Cap-Haïtien, as Poulard's successor.

Poulard died on 9 December 2018 at the age of 76.
