= Alexis-Jean-Marie Guilloux =

Roman-catholic archbishop

Alexis-Jean-Marie Guilloux (born 1819 in Ploërmel) was a French clergyman and bishop for the Roman Catholic Archdiocese of Port-au-Prince. He was ordained in 1848. He was appointed bishop in 1870 and died in 1885.
