= Irish Benevolent Society of London, Ontario =

Irish Benevolent Society of London and Area.
- Abbreviation: IBSL
- Type: Irish organization based in London, Ontario, Ontario, Canada
- Legal status: active
- Purpose: advocate and public voice, educator and network
- Headquarters: London, Ontario, Canada
- Region served: London, Ontario, Canada
- Official language: English, French
- Affiliations: Benevolent Irish Society
- Website: Irish Benevolent Society website

The Irish Benevolent Society of London and Area Since March 12, 1877, has provided an opportunity in the London area for the Irish and their descendants of all faiths, and their friends, to work together in harmony for the purpose of preserving their Irish heritage and performing works of benevolence.

The Society was unique at the time of its foundation in accepting both Roman Catholic and Protestant members. In much of Ontario sectarianism ruled, and continued to rule until well into the twentieth century, with the Orange Order pitted against Roman Catholic and other organizations. In fact, the constitution of the Society provides that presidents (who are elected for one year) must be alternately Roman Catholic and Protestant. The discussion of Irish politics has also been forbidden at meetings since the Society's inception. The Society was immediately popular, and as a result of its popularity the importance of separate Protestant and Roman Catholic organizations in municipal politics was markedly reduced.

Many organizations and individuals have benefited from the Society’s benevolence during its long history. Recent awards include an annual bursary to the most proficient student at St. Mary Choir School, a bursary to three graduates of Huron University College, London (Anglican), and similar awards to graduates of St. Peter’s Seminary, London (Catholic).

== See also ==
- The Benevolent Irish Society
