= François Gayot =

Haitian Catholic archbishop

François Gayot S.M.M.
- Archbishop of Cap-Haïtien
- Church: Catholic Church
- Archdiocese: Archdiocese of Cap-Haïtien
- In office: 7 April 1988 – 5 November 2003
- Predecessor: Albert-François Cousineau
- Successor: Hubert Constant
- Previous post: Bishop of Cap-Haïtien (1974-1988)

Orders
- Ordination: 7 February 1954
- Consecration: 2 February 1975 by Luigi Barbarito

Personal details
- Born: 17 July 1927 Saint-Louis-du-Nord, Haiti
- Died: 16 December 2010 (aged 83)

François Gayot (July 17, 1927 – December 16, 2010) was the Catholic archbishop of the Roman Catholic Archdiocese of Cap-Haïtien. Haiti.

Ordained to the priesthood in 1954, Gayot was named bishop of the then Cap-Haïtien Diocese. In 1988 the Diocese was elevated to an archdiocese. Archbishop Gayot retired in 2003 and died in 2010.
