= Hubert Constant =

Haitian Roman Catholic archbishop

Hubert Constant O.M.I
- Archbishop of Cap-Haïtien
- Church: Catholic Church
- Archdiocese: Archdiocese of Cap-Haïtien
- In office: 5 November 2003 – 1 March 2008
- Predecessor: François Gayot
- Successor: Louis Kébreau
- Previous post: Bishop of Fort-Liberté (1991-2003)

Orders
- Ordination: 15 September 1958
- Consecration: 7 April 1991 by François Gayot

Personal details
- Born: 18 September 1931 Camp-Perrin, Haiti
- Died: 23 September 2011 (aged 80)

Hubert Constant (born on 18 September 1931 in Camp-Perrin, South of Haiti and died on 23 September 2011) was the Roman Catholic metropolitan archbishop of Cap-Haïtien.

Ordained priest in the Oblates of Mary Immaculate (O.M.I.) on September 15, 1958, Msgr. Constant was named bishop of Fort-Liberté in 1991 and archbishop of Cap-Haïtien in 2003. He retired in 2008. On November 5, 2003, he was transferred to the metropolitan headquarters of Cap-Haïtien. He remained there until March 1, 2008, when Pope Benedict XVI accepted his renunciation and appointed Louis Kébreau as his successor.

== Biography ==
He was ordained a priest in the Oblates of Mary Immaculate (O.M.I.) on September 15, 1958. On January 31, 1991, John Paul II appointed him the first bishop of Fort-Liberté. He was consecrated on April 7 by Bishop François Gayot, Archbishop of Cap-Haïtien. On November 5, 2003, he was transferred to the metropolitan headquarters of Cap-Haïtien. He remained there until March 1, 2008, when Pope Benedict XVI accepted his renunciation and appointed Louis Kébreau as his successor.

== Career ==
Bishop Constant has contributed to the training of several generations of professionals who are today at different levels in the public and private sectors in Haiti and abroad. Director of studies at the Petit Séminaire of Mazenod - Camp-Perrin (where he himself went to secondary school), he was then the Founder and Director of the Collège Saint-Jean des Cayes, two of the best secondary schools in the country. He had a bachelor's degree from the Sorbonne where he also studied theology. Archbishop Emeritus since 2008, after reaching the canonical age of 75, he was advisor to the Episcopal Conference.

Hubert Constant was appointed as a bishop on January 31, 1991 by Pope John Paul II.

== Quotes ==
«Notre cœur saigne encore lorsque nous voyons se perpétuer dans notre pays ces situations d’insécurité, d’impunité, de corruption, d’exploitation à outrance pour l’argent et le pouvoir, et la mascarade de la justice.» «Our hearts still bleed when we see these situations of insecurity, impunity, corruption, excessive exploitation for money and power, and the masquerade of justice perpetuated in our country.»
