= Diocese of Hinche =

Roman Catholic diocese in Haiti

Coordinates: 19.1458°N 72.0092°W

Diocese of Hinche Dioecesis Hinchensis

Location
- Country: Haiti
- Ecclesiastical province: Province of Cap-Haïtien
- Metropolitan: Hinche

Statistics
- Area: 3,000 km^{2} (1,200 sq mi)
- Population: Total; Catholics: (as of 2013); 584,000; 355,000 (60.8%)
- Parishes: 37

Information
- Denomination: Roman Catholic
- Rite: Latin Rite
- Established: 20 April 1972 (53 years ago)
- Cathedral: Cathedral of the Immaculate Conception

Current leadership
- Pope: Leo XIV
- Bishop: Désinord Jean

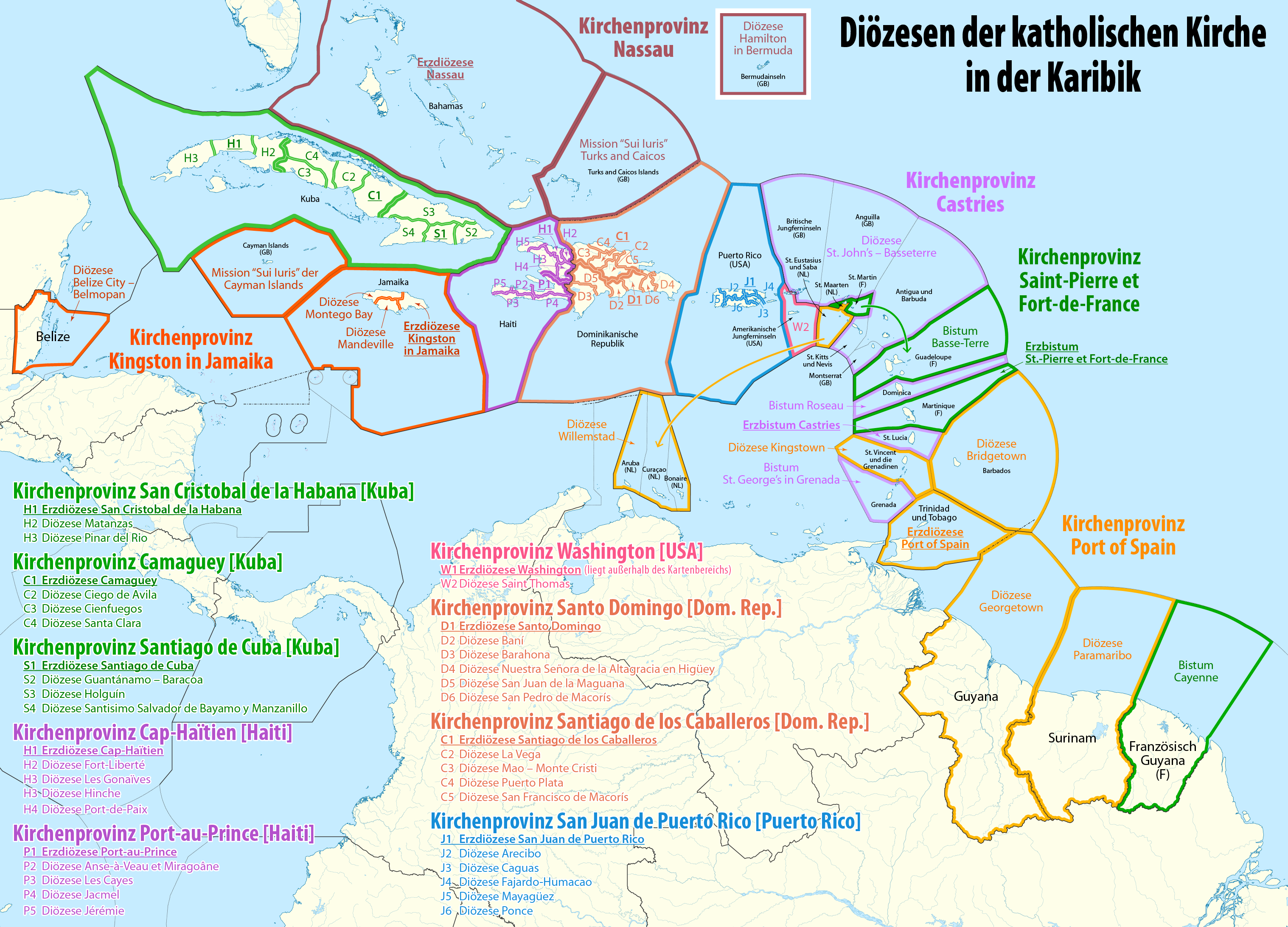

The Roman Catholic Diocese of Hinche (Latin: Dioecesis Hinchensis), erected 20 April 1972, is a suffragan of the Archdiocese of Cap-Haïtien.

== Ordinaries ==
- Jean-Baptiste Décoste (1972 - 1980)
- Léonard Pétion Laroche (1982 - 1998)
- Louis Kébreau, S.D.B. (1998 - 2008), appointed Archbishop of Cap-Haïtien
- Simon-Pierre Saint-Hillien, C.S.C. (2009 - 2015)
- Désinord Jean (2016–Present)

== Territorial losses ==
Year	Along with	To form
1991	Archdiocese of Cap-Haïtien	Diocese of Fort-Liberté

== External links and references ==
- "Diocese of Hinche". Catholic-Hierarchy.
- GCatholic.org page for this diocese
