= Constant-Mathurin Hillion =

French clergyman and Archbishop

Constant-Mathurin Hillion (born 1830 in Mauron in France) was a French clergyman and Archbishop of the Roman Catholic Archdiocese of Port-au-Prince. He was ordained in 1855.

He was appointed Bishop of Cap-Haïtien in Haïti in 1874, becoming Archbishop of Port-au-Prince in Haïti in 1886. He died in 1890.
