= Diocese of Les Cayes =

Roman Catholic diocese in Haiti

Coordinates: 18.1930°N 73.7480°W

Diocese of Les Cayes Dioecesis Caiesensis Diocèse des Cayes Dyosèz Okay
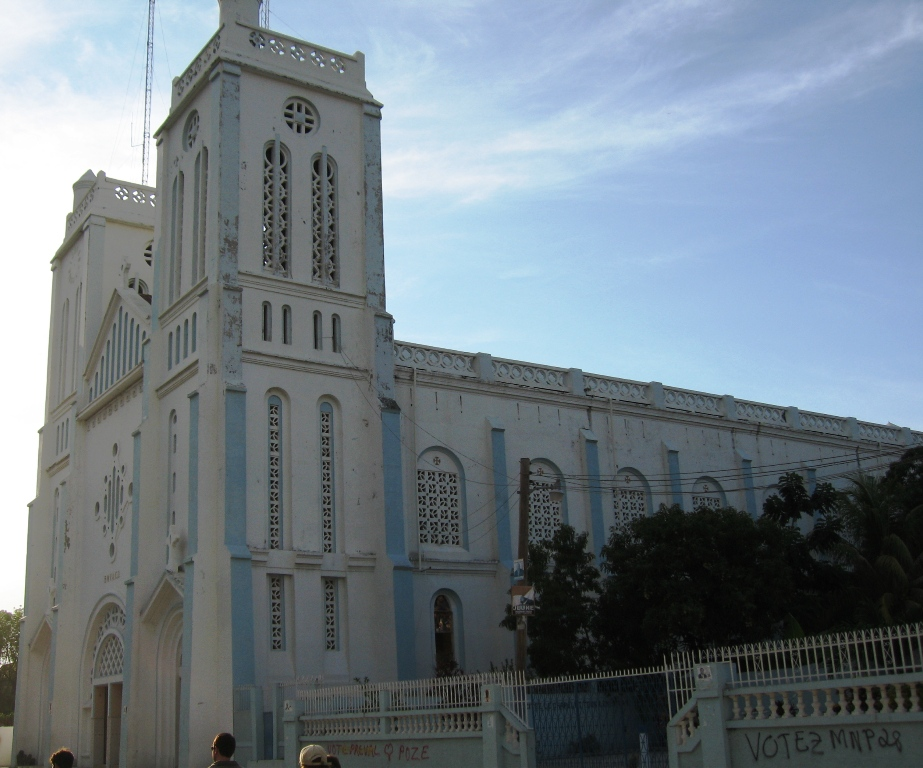
- Cathédrale Notre-Dame de l’Assomption

Location
- Country: Haiti
- Ecclesiastical province: Province of Port-au-Prince
- Metropolitan: Jérémie

Statistics
- Area: 4,649 km^{2} (1,795 sq mi)
- Population: Total; Catholics: (as of 2001); 1,400,000; 933,000 (66.6%)
- Parishes: 43

Information
- Denomination: Roman Catholic
- Rite: Latin Rite
- Established: 3 October 1861 (163 years ago)
- Cathedral: Our Lady of the Assumption Cathedral

Current leadership
- Pope: Leo XIV
- Bishop: Chibly Cardinal Langlois

The Diocese of Les Cayes (Latin: Dioecesis Caiesensis; French: Diocèse des Cayes; Haitian Creole: Dyosèz Okay), erected 3 October 1861, is a suffragan of the Archdiocese of Port-au-Prince.

== History ==
The ecclesiastical province of Port-au-Prince (the archdiocese and the four suffragan dioceses of Cap Haïtien, Les Gonaïves, Les Cayes, and Port-de-Paix) dates from the reorganization following upon the Concordat of 1860 between Pope Pius IX and the Republic of Haiti.

== Bishops ==
=== Ordinaries ===
- Jean-Marie-Alexandre Morice (1893–1914)
- Ignace-Marie Le Ruzic (1916–1919)
- Jules-Victor-Marie Pichon (1919–1941)
- François-Joseph Person (1941–1941)
- Jean Louis Collignan, O.M.I. (1942–1966)
- Jean-Jacques Claudius Angénor (1966–1988)
- Jean Alix Verrier (1988–2009)
- Guire Poulard (2009–2011); named Archbishop of Port-au-Prince
- Chibly Langlois (since 2011); elevated to Cardinal in 2014

=== Coadjutor bishops ===
- François-Joseph Person (1937–1941)
- Jean Alix Verrier (1985–1988)

=== Auxiliary bishop ===
- Charles-Edouard Peters, S.M.M. (1966–1972), appointed Bishop of Jérémie

=== Other priests of this diocese who became bishops ===
- Joseph Willy Romélus, appointed Bishop of Jérémie in 1977
- Joseph Gontrand Décoste (priest here, 1994–1998), appointed Bishop of Jérémie in 2009

== Territorial losses ==
Year	Along with	To form
1972		Diocese of Jérémie
