= François-Wolff Ligondé =

Haitian Roman Catholic archbishop (1928–2013)

The Most Reverend François-Wolff Ligondé
- Archbishop of Port-au-Prince
- Church: Roman Catholic
- Archdiocese: Port-au-Prince
- See: Cathedral of Our Lady of the Assumption
- Appointed: 20 August 1966
- Retired: 1 March 2008
- Predecessor: François-Marie-Joseph Poirier
- Successor: Joseph Serge Miot

Orders
- Ordination: 11 July 1954 by Rémy Jérôme Augustin
- Consecration: 28 October 1966 by Antonio Samorè

Personal details
- Born: 17 January 1928 Les Cayes, Haiti
- Died: 8 April 2013 (aged 85)

François-Wolff Ligondé (January 17, 1928 in Les Cayes – April 8, 2013) was a Haitian Roman Catholic prelate who served as Archbishop of Port-au-Prince from 1966 to 2008. He was the first Haitian to hold the office.

Ligondé was born in 1928 in Les Cayes. He was ordained to the priesthood on 11 July 1954 by Monsignor Rémy Augustin, the first Haitian-born bishop and auxiliary bishop of Port-au-Prince. He became a professor at the Collège Saint Louis of Jérémie before being sent to study in Fribourg, Switzerland. Ligondé was appointed Archbishop of Port-au-Prince on 20 August 1966. Ligondé's appointment came five days after the signing of a concordat between Haiti and the Holy See which allowed François Duvalier to personally nominate high-ranking Haitian clerics.

Ligondé was the first Haitian-born Archbishop of Port-au-Prince, his predecessors having been white Europeans (mostly Frenchmen). Prior to the concordat, Duvalier had engaged in a lengthy struggle with the Catholic magisterium to "nationalize" the Haitian church and staff its hierarchy with black Haitian clerics. Duvalier expelled Ligondé's immediate predecessor, French-born François Poirier, along with other senior clerics (including Msgr. Augustin), in 1960.

As a result of his patronage by François Duvalier, Ligondé was a close ally of Duvalier and his son Jean-Claude "Baby Doc" Duvalier, and frequently praised them in his sermons. He presided over Papa Doc's funeral and the opulent wedding of Baby Doc and Michèle Bennett (also Ligondé's niece) in Port-au-Prince Cathedral in 1980, which was broadcast live to the nation.

After the fall of Baby Doc, Ligondé found himself at odds with Salesian priest and emerging politician Jean-Bertrand Aristide, who characterized Ligondé as a "faithful servant" of the Duvaliers. In January 1991, Ligondé reportedly "fled into the night clad only in undershorts" when mobs attacked the Port-au-Prince Cathedral during a coup attempt against President Aristide. In a sermon shortly prior to the attack, he compared Aristide's government to a Bolshevik dictatorship. This statement was "seen as giving the green light for the coup". Ligondé and other church leaders subsequently went into hiding.

Following the September 1991 coup d'état in Haiti, the Archbishop of Port-au-Prince, François Wolf Ligondé Ligondé, faced intense persecution by Lavalas militias. His covert evacuation from the country was coordinated by the Dominican diplomatic mission, headed by José del carmen acosta del Carmen Acosta, then Ambassador Extraordinary and Plenipotentiary of the Dominican Republic.

Ligondé was transported in a vehicle protected by diplomatic immunity through the Malpasse border crossing, accompanied by the ambassador's daughter, Norkelly Acosta, and physician Dr. Carlos Cuello Davison. The group reportedly managed to bypass military checkpoints.

After a brief security stop in Barahona, the archbishop was taken to the Apostolic Nunciature in Santo Domingo, where he received the formal protection of the Catholic Church and Monsignor Agripino Núñez Collado.

Although his pastoral role as archbishop ended after this incident, he remained archbishop until his retirement on 1 March 2008.

Ligondé died on 8 April 2013. His funeral at the Church of the Sacred Heart in Turgeau was attended by then-president Michel Martelly and other notables.
