= Louis Kébreau =

Haitian clergyman

Louis Kébreau S.D.B.
- Archbishop Emeritus of Cap-Haïtien
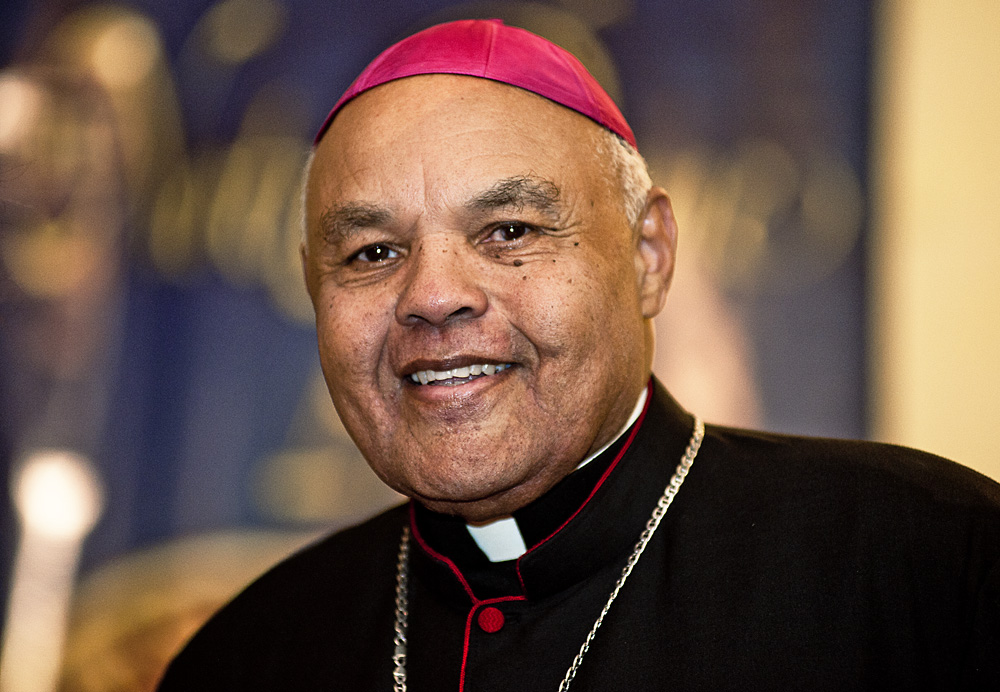
- Church: Catholic Church
- Archdiocese: Archdiocese of Cap-Haïtien
- In office: 1 March 2008 – 22 November 2014
- Predecessor: Hubert Constant
- Successor: Max Leroy Mésidor
- Previous posts: Bishop of Hinche (1998-2008); Titular Bishop of Selendeta (1986-1998); Auxiliary Bishop of Port-au-Prince (1986-1998)

Orders
- Ordination: 11 May 1974
- Consecration: 25 January 1987 by Bernardin Gantin

Personal details
- Born: 8 November 1938 (age 87) Jérémie, Haiti

Louis Nerval Kébreau (born November 8, 1938, in Jérémie) is a Haitian Catholic retired prelate who served as Archbishop of Cap-Haïtien from 2008 to 2014. He was ordained as a priest in 1974, before being appointed Bishop of Hinche in 1998. He retired in 2014.
