= Archdiocese of Cap-Haïtien =

Latin Catholic archdiocese in Haiti

Coordinates: 19.7614°N 72.2006°W

Archdiocese of Cap-Haïtien Archdioecesis Capitis Haitiani Cathédrale Notre-Dame de l'Assomption
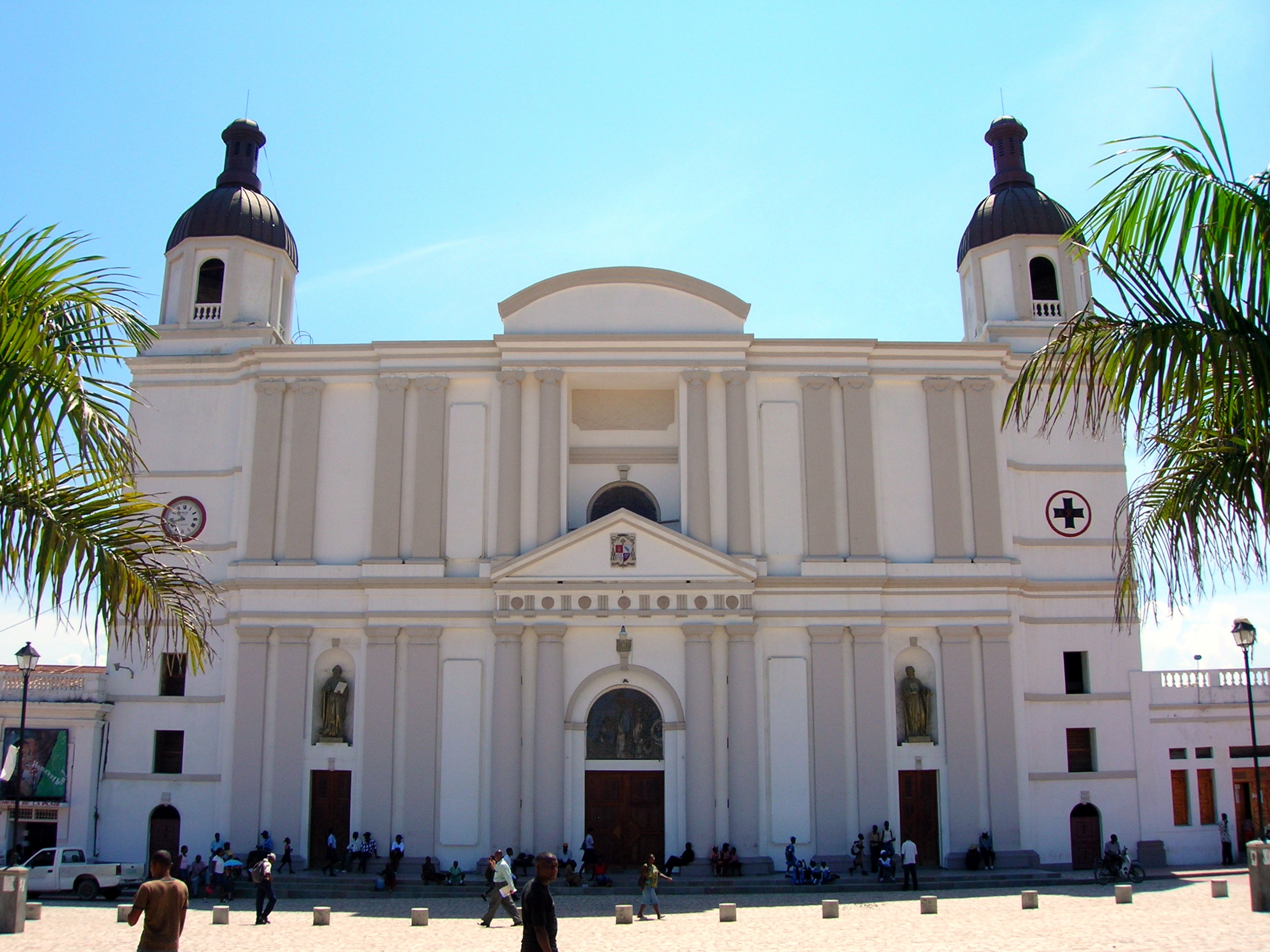
- Cathédrale Notre-Dame de l’Assomption

Location
- Country: Haiti
- Ecclesiastical province: Province of Cap-Haïtien

Statistics
- Area: 2,200 km^{2} (850 sq mi)
- Population: Total; Catholics: (as of 2006); 1,463,520; 778,110 (53.2%)
- Parishes: 43

Information
- Denomination: Catholic
- Rite: Roman Rite
- Established: 3 October 1861 (163 years ago)
- Cathedral: Cathedral of Our Lady of the Assumption

Current leadership
- Pope: Leo XIV
- Archbishop: Launay Saturné
- Bishops emeritus: Louis Kébreau, S.D.B.

The Archdiocese of Cap-Haïtien (French: Archidiocèse de Cap-Haïtien; Latin: Archidioecesis Capitis Haitiani), erected 3 October 1861 as the Diocese of Cap-Haïtien, is a metropolitan diocese, responsible for the suffragan Dioceses of Fort-Liberté, Hinche, Les Gonaïves and Port-de-Paix. It was elevated on 7 April 1988.

== Bishops ==
=== Ordinaries ===
- Constant-Mathurin Hillion (1872–1886), appointed Archbishop of Port-au-Prince
- François-Marie Kersuzan (1886–1929)
- Jean-Marie Jan (1929–1953)
- Albert François Cousineau, C.S.C. (1953–1974); Archbishop (personal title) in 1968
- François Gayot, S.M.M. (1974–2003)
- Hubert Constant, O.M.I. (2003–2008)
- Louis Nerval Kébreau, S.D.B. (2008–2014)
- Max Leroy Mésidor, (2014-2017), appointed Archbishop of Port-au-Prince
- Launay Saturné (2018-)

=== Coadjutor bishops ===
- Jean-Marie Jan (1924-1929)
- Albert François Cousineau, C.S.C. (1951-1953)
- Max Leroy Mésidor (2013-2014)
