= Cathedral of Our Lady of the Assumption, Port-au-Prince =

Ruined Roman Catholic cathedral in Port-au-Prince, Haiti

Cathedral of Our Lady of the Assumption
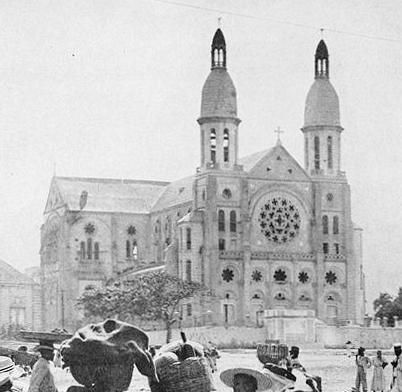
- Cathedral before 1924

Religion
- Affiliation: Catholic Church
- Diocese: Archdiocese of Port-au-Prince
- Rite: Roman Rite
- Leadership: Mgr Guire Poulard, Archbishop of Port-au-Prince
- Year consecrated: 1928
- Status: Destroyed (2010)

Location
- Location: Port-au-Prince, Haiti
- Interactive map of Cathedral of Our Lady of the Assumption
- Coordinates: 18°32′56.6″N 72°20′19″W

Architecture
- Type: Cathedral
- Groundbreaking: 1884
- Completed: 1914

The Cathedral of Our Lady of the Assumption (French: Cathédrale Notre-Dame de L'Assomption), often called Port-au-Prince Cathedral (French: Cathédrale de Port-au-Prince), was a cathedral in Port-au-Prince, Haiti. Built between 1884 and 1914, it was dedicated on December 13, 1928, and became the cathedral church of the Roman Catholic Archdiocese of Port-au-Prince. The cathedral was destroyed in the devastating 2010 Haiti earthquake.

Before its destruction, the cupola of the north tower of the cathedral served as the front lighthouse of a pair, guiding mariners into Port-au-Prince harbor.

== Destruction ==
The roof and the towers flanking the main entrance collapsed in the 2010 earthquake, although the lower parts of the walls remain standing. The earthquake also destroyed the nunciature and the archdiocesan offices, killing Archbishop Joseph Serge Miot instantly and Vicar General Charles Benoit later.

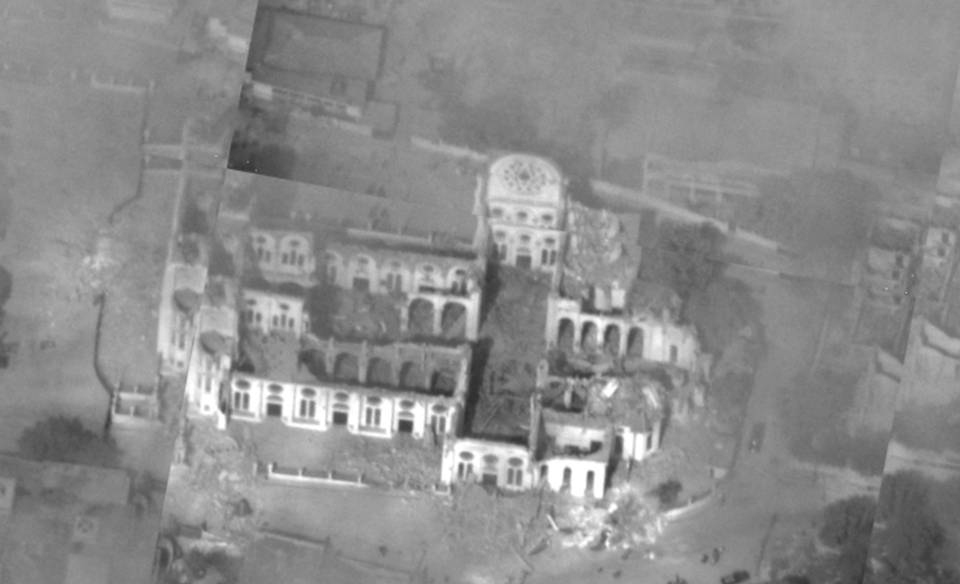
Remnants of the cathedral after its collapse. The aerial photo was taken 2 days after the earthquake of Tuesday, 12 January 2010

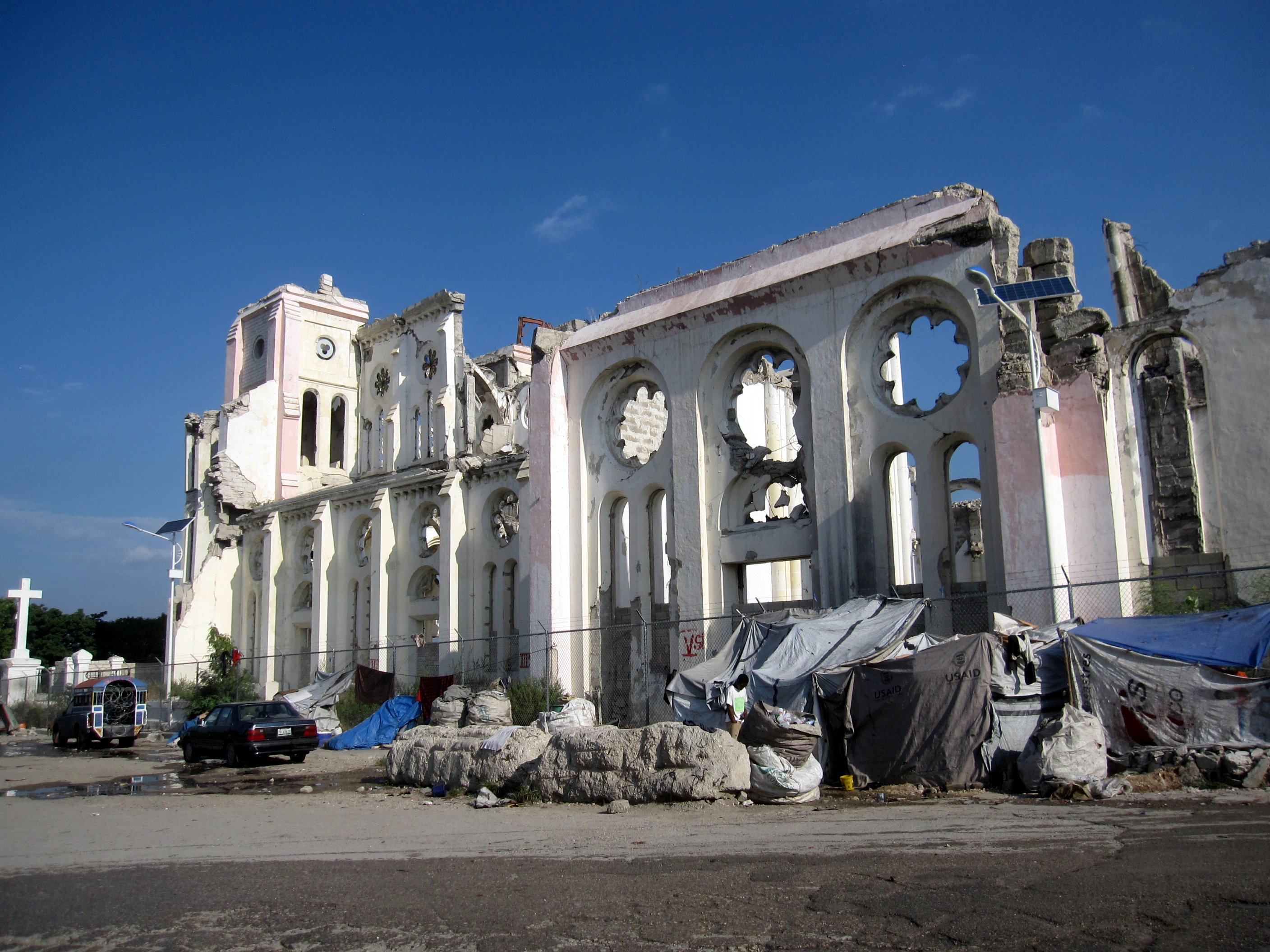
Remnants of the cathedral after its collapse

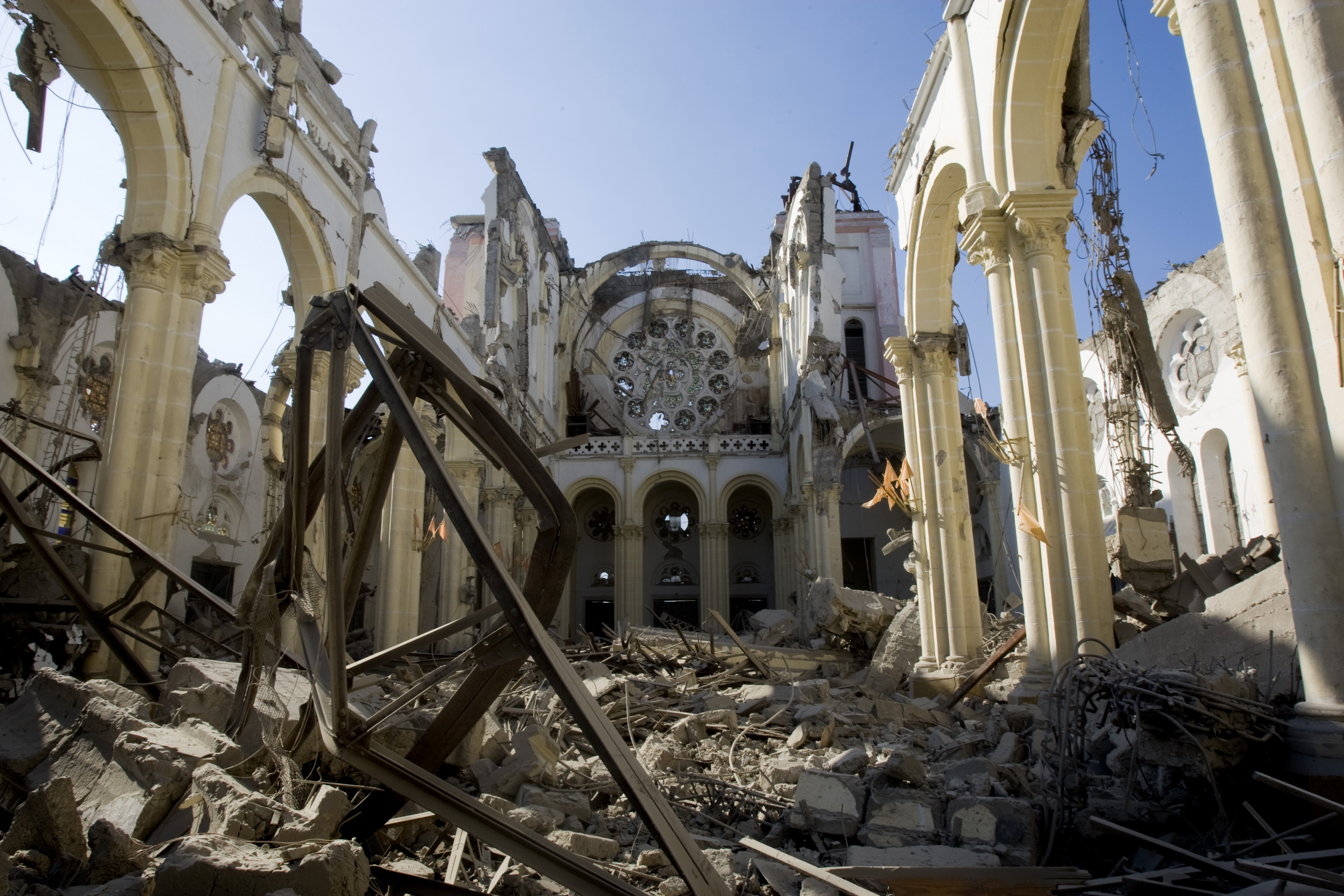
Interior of the cathedral after its collapse

== Reconstruction ==
In March 2012, the Archdiocese of Port-au-Prince, in collaboration with Faith & Form magazine and the Institute for the Safeguarding of National Heritage (ISPAN), a Haitian-government institution, launched an international design competition inviting architects from around the world to submit ideas that would inform the reconstruction of the cathedral.

Puerto Rican architect Segundo Cardona, whose works include the Coliseum of San Juan and the Puerto Rico Pavilion built for the 1992 World Expo in Seville, Spain, won the competition. He proposed to integrate and frame the façade of the old building, which survived the earthquake, with two new concrete towers, while the old nave, whose pillars also partially survived, would be transformed into a covered courtyard. The religious ceremonies would take place at the level of the current transept under a vast room surmounted by a dome, underneath which would be the altar. The new design would allow for a capacity of 1,200 faithful (capacity which could be raised to 600 additional persons thanks to the use of the covered yard). The interior of the new cathedral would be marked by the creative and abundant use of natural light, as the supply of electricity in Port-au-Prince is intermittent and expensive. The Miami Herald described the winning design as "a modern interpretation of the traditional architecture of a cathedral."

Despite millions being allocated for reconstruction efforts, the cathedral remains in ruins as of 2021. The congregation currently meets out of a smaller, transitional cathedral in the back of the current ruins, which was consecrated in 2014.

== See also ==
- List of cathedrals in Haiti
