= Catholic Church in Haiti =

The Catholic Church in Haiti is part of the worldwide Catholic Church, under the spiritual leadership of the pope, the Curia in Rome and the Conference of Haitian Bishops.

There are ten dioceses including two archdioceses. The national patron saint of Haiti is Our Mother of Perpetual Help.

== Colonisation and the first wave of evangelization (1511–1806) ==
"The Dioceses of Santo Domingo and Concepción de la Vega were founded in 1511, and the island of Hispaniola that Haiti shares with the Dominican Republic, was divided between these bishoprics. In 1527 Concepción was incorporated into Santo Domingo, which remained the only diocese until 1862. Many regular clergy came with the French into the French territory, especially the Dominicans and the Capuchins. The Dominicans devoted themselves especially to the mission in the western part of the colony, and were for a time supported therein by other orders and secular priests."

"The Dominicans were also designated as missionaries to the southern part of the island. The Capuchins, who looked after the northern part of the island, and were likewise assisted by other orders and secular priests, soon were unable to supply enough missionaries. On that account they gave up this mission in 1704, and were replaced by the Jesuits, who worked there until their expulsion at the end of 1763. Secular priests followed, but after five years they were superseded by Capuchins."

"The Haitian Revolution brought an end to the first wave of evangelisation. Influence by the clergy ceased in the northern part of the country, the western mission improved under the British occupation from 1794 to 1798, while, in the south, the Apostolic prefect Père Viriot, was murdered. When the leader of the revolution Toussaint Louverture came to power in 1800, he restored the rights of the Catholic Church. However, the council of Constitutional bishops at Paris had nominated a bishop of Santo Domingo, who never obtained recognition either from Toussaint or the Capuchins. In 1802 General Leclere restored the former jurisdictions of Cap-Haïtien and Port-au-Prince, and named as prefects Apostolic Pères Corneille Brelle, O. Cap., and Lecun, O. P. These appointments were confirmed by the Vatican. Tensions increased as poverty spread, mistreatment of slaves was common and a class system grew between a French-speaking Catholic minority and the poorer Creole majority. The Haitian slaves revolted in 1804 and, under the leadership of Jean-Jacques Dessalines (Emperor of Haiti 1804–1806), Haiti became the first black independent nation. After a massacre in 1804, nearly all the clergy left the colony but Jean-Baptiste-Joseph Brelle became the Archbishop ("grand-archevêque") of Haiti (without a regular appointment), named by Dessalines. For the following two years the only religious services given at Port-au-Prince were held by a former sacristan. After the overthrow of Jacques I in 1806 some missionaries returned."

== The Concordat and the second wave of evangelization (1860–1910) ==
"After years of negotiations, a concordat between the Catholic Church and the Haitian government was signed on 28 March 1860. In December 1860, Monseigneur Monetti arrived as the Church's delegate.

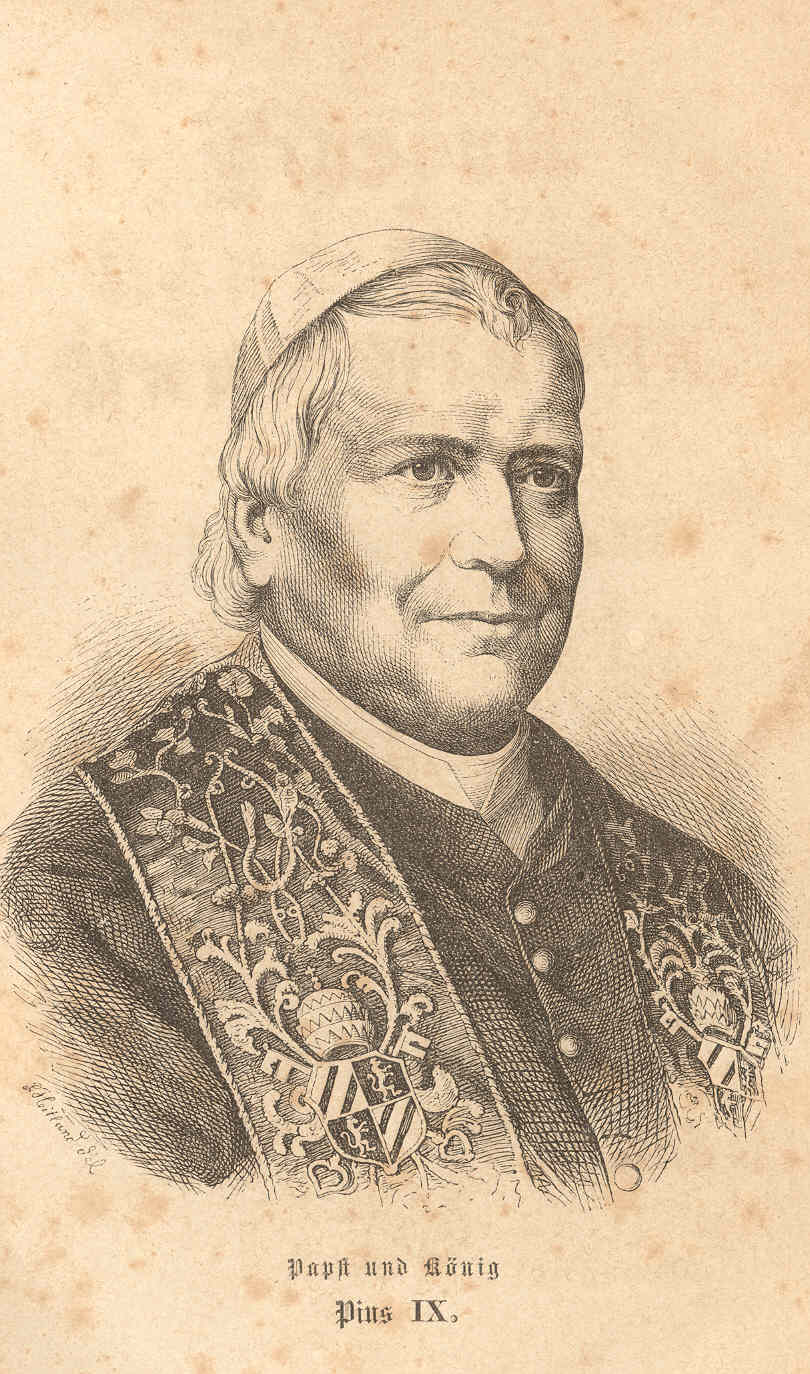
Pope Pius IX signed the Concordat with Haiti

The concordat provided that the Catholic Church would have the special protection of the Government. The president would nominate the archbishop and the bishops, but the Pope could refuse them canonical institution. The clergy received an annual salary of 1200 francs from the State."

"Five bishoprics were erected in 1861; the Archbishopric of Port-au-Prince, and the Sees of Cap-Haitien, Les Cayes, Gonaïves, and Port-de-Paix. Initially, the Archbishop of Port-au-Prince administered all the dioceses. A separate bishop was appointed to Cap-Haïtien in 1873, who would also oversee the administration of Port-au-Paix. In 1893 a separate bishop was appointed for Les Cayes; while Gonaïves was still administered by the archbishop. On the conclusion of the concordat, three fathers of the Congregation of the Holy Ghost and of the Holy Heart of Mary were sent to Port-au-Prince. These restored the regular parish organization in the capital. The first archbishop, du Cosquer, and his successor, Quilloux, visited France to enlist new priests. Because of diseases in the tropical climate, many of the clergy died. By 1906, out of 516 priests who had come from France since 1864, 200 had died, 150 were still at their posts, and the rest were invalided to Europe. To ensure recruits, Mgr. du Cosquer established the Saint-Martial Seminary in 1864, which was united with the Colonial Seminary conducted by the Fathers of the Holy Ghost. It received an annual state subsidy of 20,000 francs, the payment of which, however, was suspended owing to the political troubles of 1867, and in 1869 it was entirely abrogated. In 1870, owing to the war, the Fathers of the Holy Ghost gave up direction of the seminary. Mgr. Quilloux then founded a new seminary in Pontchâteau (Loire inférieure) in 1873 under the direction of the Fathers of the Society of Mary. Finally in 1893, the seminary was removed to St-Jacques (Finisterre) and its direction entrusted to the secular priests. By 1909, Pontchâteau Seminary had sent 196 priests to Haiti, and St. Jacques had sent 171, for 92 parishes."

== The struggle and reconciliation with vodou culture (1934–1990) ==
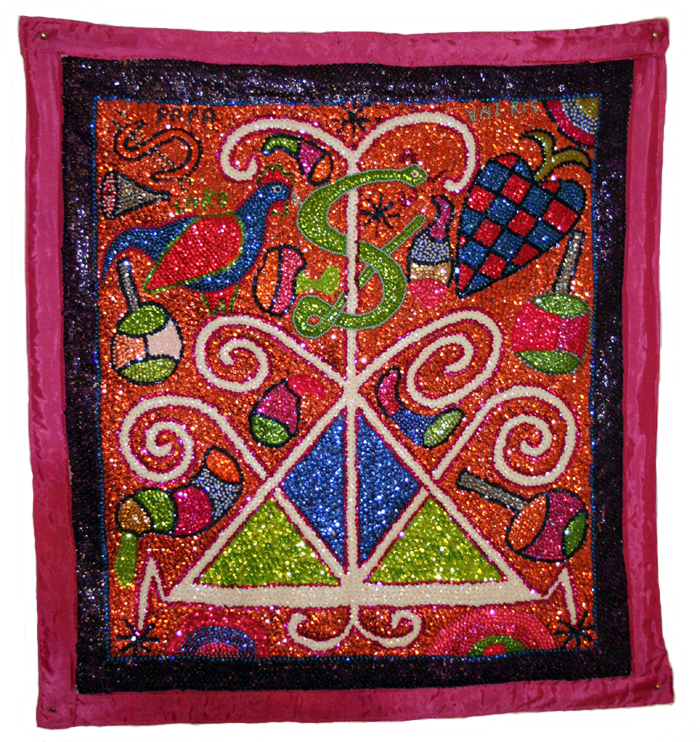
A large sequined Vodou "drapo" or flag by the artist George Valris, depicting the veve, or symbol, of the loa Loko Atison.

After the American Occupation ended in 1934, there was a constant struggle for power between the Catholic Church and the followers of vodou. The small number of priests and members of religious institutes in the 1930s ministered mainly to the urban elite. Until the mid-20th century, the majority of priests were francophone Europeans, particularly Bretons, who were culturally distant from their rural parishioners. Catholic clergy were generally hostile toward vodou, and they led two major campaigns against the religion in 1896 and 1941. During these campaigns, the government outlawed vodou services, and Catholics destroyed vodou religious objects. Catholic clergy, however, have not been persistently militant in their opposition to vodou, and they have had relatively little impact on the religious practices of the rural and the urban poor. The clergy have generally directed their energies more toward educating the urban population than toward eradicating vodou. In the 1970s and the 1980s, the use of Creole and drum music became common in Catholic services. Incorporating folk elements into the liturgy, however, did not mean that the Catholic Church's attitude toward vodou had changed. In everyday practice, many people incorporate both Catholicism and vodou together.

Nationalists and others came to resent the Catholic Church because of its European orientation and its alliance with the mulatto elite. François Duvalier opposed the church more than any other Haitian president. He expelled the archbishop of Port-au-Prince, the Jesuit order, and numerous priests between 1959 and 1961. In response to these moves, the Vatican excommunicated Duvalier until 1966. When relations with the church were restored in 1966, a Haitian archbishop was named for the first time, and the president gained the right to nominate bishops.

In the aftermath of Jean-Claude Duvalier's departure, the church took a less active role in Haiti's politics. The church hierarchy strongly supported the suppressed 1987 Constitution, which granted official status to Creole and guaranteed basic human rights, including the right to practice vodou. The alliance with the lower classes left the Catholic Church with two unresolved problems in the late 1980s: its uneasy relationship with vodou and its relationship to the more radical elements of the political movement that it had supported.

== The fight against poverty and liberation theology (1990–2004) ==
The mid-1980s marked a profound change in the church's stance on issues related to peasants and the urban poor. Reflecting this change was the statement by Pope John Paul II, during a visit to Haiti in 1983, that "Things must change here". Galvanized by the Vatican's concern, Catholic clergy and lay workers called for improved human rights. Lay workers helped develop a peasant-community movement, especially at a center in the Plateau Central. The Catholic radio station, Radio Soleil, played a key role in disseminating news about government actions during the 1985-86 crisis and encouraging opponents of the Duvalier government. The bishops, particularly in Jérémie and Cap-Haïtien, actively denounced Duvalierist repression and human-rights violations.

In 1990, a priest from the slums of Port-au-Prince was elected by 67% of the people: Jean Bertrand Aristide, seen as the first leader of the people since 1804.

Though Cardinal Ratzinger did praise the theology's intellectual underpinnings that reject violence, and, instead, "[stress] the responsibility which Christians necessarily bear for the poor and oppressed", he strongly opposed certain elements of liberation theology, though the Congregation for the Doctrine of the Faith and the Vatican twice (1984, 1986) officially condemned its acceptance of Marxism and armed violence. Since then, the Catholic Church in Haiti has adopted a more prayerful, pacifist and human approach in providing help and justice for the poor, as can be shown in the conduct of Father Gérard Jean-Juste.

== 21st century ==
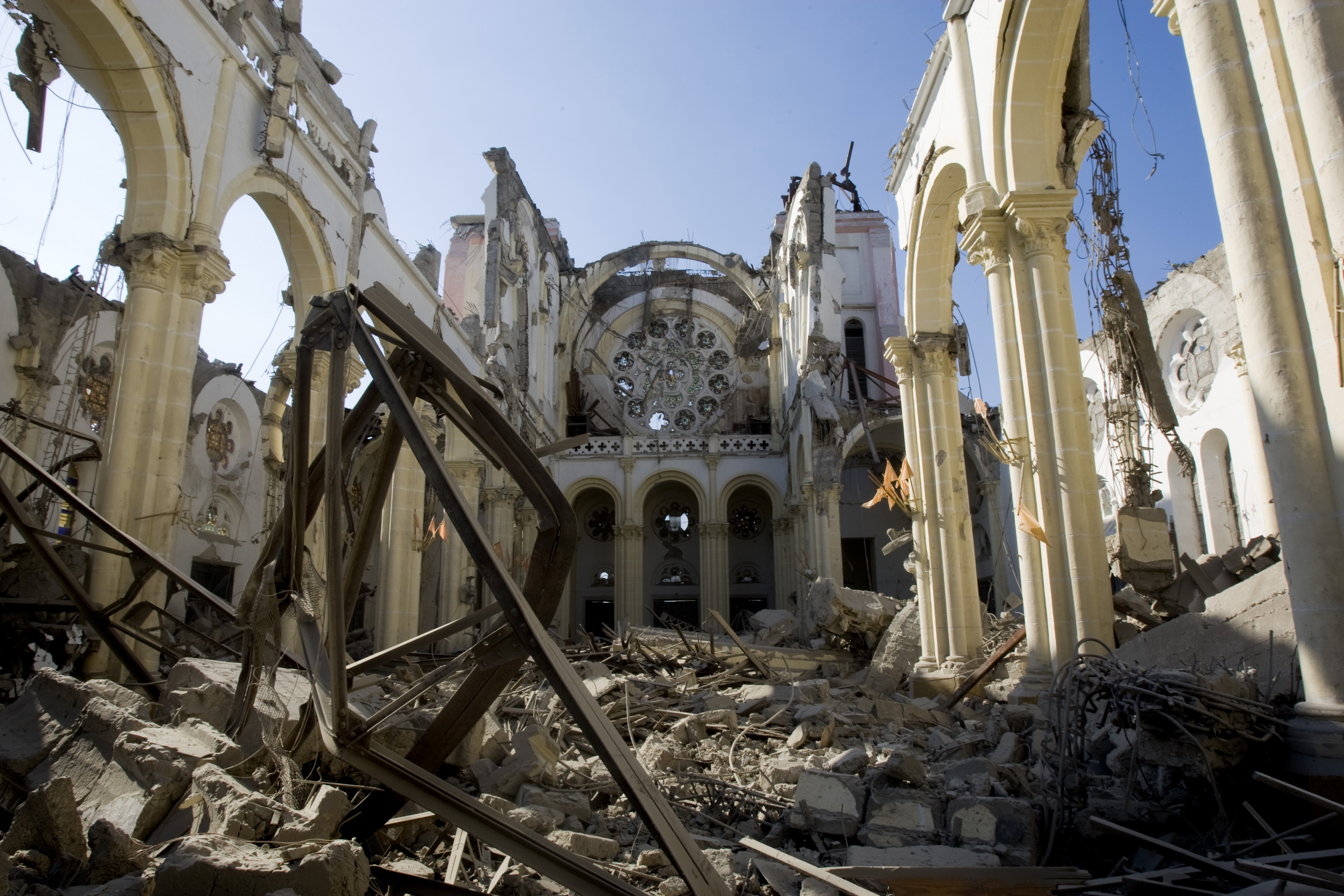
Remnants of the Cathedral of Our Lady of the Assumption after its collapse during the 2010 Haiti earthquake. In 2020, the building is still in ruins.

The Church is attempting to assist Haitians who are in poverty, and with their health and living conditions. In accordance with Catholic social teaching, it strives to vindicate the right to life of all people in Haiti, through partnerships and twinnings.

According to the Catholic Church in Haiti, the ten dioceses of the two ecclesiastical provinces of Haiti include 251 parishes and about 1,500 Christian rural communities. The indigenous clergy has 400 diocesan priests and 300 seminarians. Vocations to the priesthood are considered sufficient. There are also 1,300 religious missionary priests belonging to more than 70 religious congregations.

Church leaders and property sustained damage as the result of the 2010 Haitian earthquake. Killed included Port-au-Prince's Archbishop Joseph Serge Miot, his chancellor, many seminarians and religious, and the sister of Cardinal Paulo Evaristo Arns of Brazil. The Port-au-Prince Cathedral, other churches in Port-au-Prince and neighboring cities, including those of Léogâne and Petit-Goave; the Notre Dame Grand Seminary; and some archdiocesan offices sustained major damage or destruction.

In 2014 the pope named the first Haitian to become a cardinal of the Church: Chibly Langlois, Bishop of Les Cayes and president of the Haitian Episcopal Conference.

Following the turmoil in which Haiti was embroiled in 2021, with the murder of President Jovenel Moïse, the Haitian Catholic Bishops launched an appeal for unity, saying "the moment in which we are living is extremely serious and particularly decisive at this irreversible turning point of our history. What is at stake is our present and our future, and therefore our existence itself as a people, as a nation, as a state. We must make courageous and effective decisions.”

“Our dear Haiti is crossing a difficult stage in its history,” wrote the bishops. “Who is going to finally stop her descent into hell? The Haitian people really cannot do it anymore. They are tired, worn out, exhausted." Calling for an end to for division, disunity, disagreement, discord and fratricidal struggles for power, for the unchecked and shameless pursuit of personal, egoistic and petty interests", the bishops called on politicians to "come to the widest possible consensus so as to enable a definitive exit from the crisis."

In 2022 there were several cases of anti-Catholic violence in Haiti, namely the kidnapping of Fr Whatner Aupont, who was later released, the murder of Sister Luisa Dell’Orto, and the arson attack on the Cathedral in Port-au-Prince, as well as the looting of Caritas offices in other parts of the country. Difficulties remained in 2023, but 2024 saw an aggravation of the situation with a spate of kidnappings of priests and religious and attacks on Catholic institutions and property. Bishop Pierre André Dumas was injured in a bombing in February, although the motive of the attack was unclear, and he may not have been the intended target. In March the country's bishops launched an urgent plea for peace and national reconciliation.

According to the 2017 Haitian Government Survey (2017), Catholics made up 52% of the population. Independent figures in 2020 put this at 65.9%.

== See also ==
- Christianity in Haiti
- Christian-Voodoo relations
- Social class in Haiti
- List of Central American and Caribbean saints
