= Patrick Gaffney (anthropologist) =

American anthropologist and Holy Cross priest

The Revd. Professor Dr. Patrick Daniel Gaffney C.S.C
- প্যাট্রিক ড্যানিয়েল গ্যাফনি
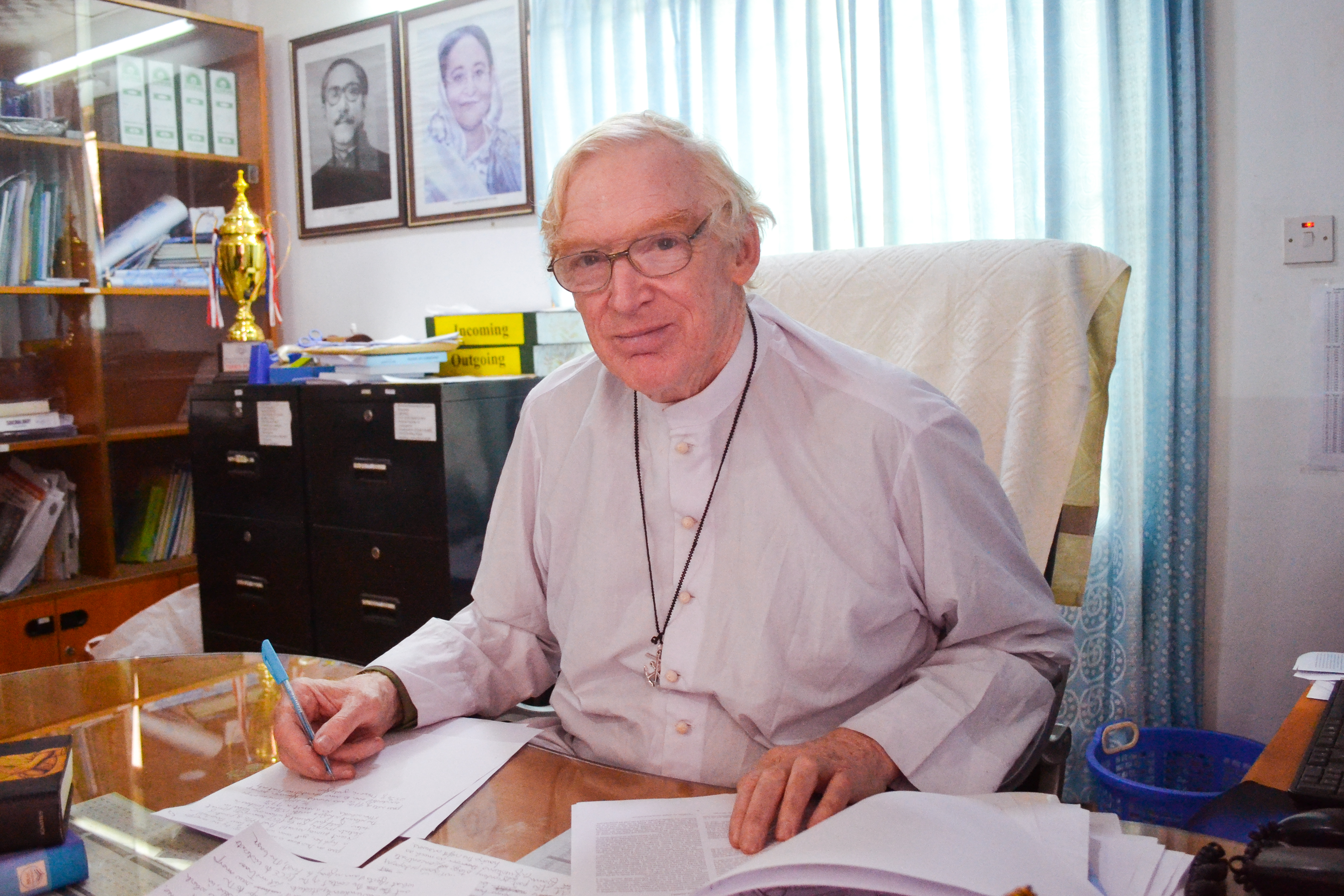
- Pattrick Gaffney in 2022

Vice-chancellor of the Notre Dame University Bangladesh
- Incumbent
- Assumed office 2017
- Preceded by: Benjamin Costa

Personal details
- Born: 1947 (age 78–79) United States
- Education: University of Chicago; University of Notre Dame
- Occupation: Academic, Anthropologist, Catholic priest

Patrick Daniel Gaffney (born 1947) is an American catholic priest who is an anthropologist, academic, translator, member of the Congregation of Holy Cross and the current Vice-Chancellor of Notre Dame University Bangladesh.

== Education and career ==
He earned his PhD from the University of Chicago and has taught at the University of Notre Dame, USA, since 1980. For his academic work, he received Kaneb Teaching Award in 2001, and Reinhold Niebuhr Award in 2002. A polyglot fluent in Arabic, French, German, Dutch, Spanish, Italian, Russian, and a competent reader in Latin, Greek, Hebrew, Gaffney translated Renaissance of the East by Hans Fortmann in 1972 and With Open Hands by Henri Nouwen in 1973 from Dutch into English. An expert on Islam and Islamic culture, Gaffney authored The Prophet's Pulpit: Islamic Preaching in Contemporary Egypt in 1994 and co-authored Breaking Cycles of Violence: Conflict Prevention and Intrastate Crises in 1999.

== Works ==
- The Prophet's Pulpit: Islamic Preaching in Contemporary Egypt (1994)
- Breaking Cycles of Violence: Conflict Prevention and Intrastate Crises (1999, co-author)

=== Translations ===
- Renaissance of the East (originally by Hans Fortmann)
- With Open Hands (originally by Henri Nouwen)
