= Notre Dame University Bangladesh =

Private Catholic university in Dhaka

- নটরডেম বিশ্ববিদ্যালয় বাংলাদেশ
- Crest of Notre Dame University Bangladesh
- Other name: NDUB
- Motto: The Competence to See and the Courage to Act
- Type: private catholic non-profit university
- Established: 2013; 13 years ago
- Accreditation: UGC; IEB; ACBSP
- Religious affiliation: Roman Catholic Church (Congregation of Holy Cross)
- Academic affiliations: IFCU; ACCU; NDEA; Universities Australia
- Chancellor: President Mirza Fakhrul Islam Alamgir
- Vice-Chancellor: Patrick Gaffney, C.S.C
- Academic staff: 175+ (2019)
- Administrative staff: 100+ (2019)
- Students: 8000 (2020)
- Undergraduates: 6600 (2019)
- Postgraduates: 2400 (2019)
- Location: Dhaka, 1000, Bangladesh; 23.7296°N 90.4211°E
- Campus: Urban, 65,000 sq ft (6,000 m^{2}), 1.7 acres
- Language: English
- Colours: Blue and pale orange
- Website: ndub.edu.bd

Notre Dame University Bangladesh or NDUB (Bengali: নটর ডেম বিশ্ববিদ্যালয় বাংলাদেশ), is a private non-profit Catholic university in Bangladesh. Located in Motijheel, Dhaka, the university was founded by the Congregation of Holy Cross in 2013 on the heartiest request from Catholic Bishops' Conference of Bangladesh. After receiving approval from the Ministry of Education, the People’s Republic of Bangladesh, and University Grants Commission (UGC), Notre Dame University Bangladesh commenced its academic activities in the fall of 2014.

== History ==
On 29 April 2013, the government of Bangladesh approved the university, clearing the way for academic instruction to begin.

In August 2017, Father Patrick Daniel Gaffney was appointed vice-chancellor of the university. He was reappointed in 2022.

In June 2024, the University Grants Commission approved the creation of a sixth department, microbiology, at the university.

== Membership ==
The university is a member of the International Federation of Catholic Universities (IFCU) and Association to Advance Collegiate Schools of Business (AACSB).

== Academic programs ==
The university's four departments are organized into four schools.

The proposed building for the permanent campus of NDUB

=== Notre Dame of Life Science and Biomedical (NDLSB) ===
==== Undergraduate program ====
- Bachelor of Science in Microbiology

==== Graduate program ====
- Master of Science in Microbiology

=== Notre Dame of Engineering, Technology, and Sciences (NDETS) ===
==== Undergraduate program ====
- Bachelor of Science in computer science and engineering (CSE)

==== Graduate program ====
- Master of Science in computer science and engineering (CSE)

=== Notre Dame Business School (NDBS) ===
==== Undergraduate program ====
The school offers an undergraduate Bachelor of Business Administration (BBA) degree. Available areas of concentration are accounting, economics, finance, management, human resource management, international business, management information systems(MIS), and marketing.

- Bachelor of Business Administration (BBA)

==== Graduate program (MBA) ====
The school offers an MBA degree. Students are allowed up to five years from the date of initial enrollment to complete the degree requirements. If students take the maximum course load, they can finish the program within five semesters, or within three semesters if they have waivers or transfer courses. Available areas of concentration are banking, finance, human resources management, and marketing.

- Master of Business Administration (MBA for BBA) (regular)

==== Graduate program (EMBA) ====
The school also offers an EMBA degree

- Executive Master of Business Administration (EMBA) (executive)
- Master of Business Administration (MBA)

=== Notre Dame of Social Science and Humanities (NDSSH) ===
- Bachelor of Social Science in Economics (BSS)
- Bachelor of Laws (LLB)
- Bachelor of Arts in English Language & Literature (BA)

==== Graduate program ====
- Master of Laws (LLM)
- MA in English literature (MA)
- MA in ELT and Applied Linguistics (MA)

=== Grading policy ===
Class Intervals of Scores	Letter Grade	Grade Points
80 – 100	A+	4.00
75 - 79	A	3.75
70 – 74	A-	3.50
65 – 69	B+	3.25
60 – 64	B	3.00
55 - 59	B-	2.75
50 – 54	C+	2.50
45 – 49	C	2.25
40 – 44	D	2.00
Less than 40	F	0.00

== Administration ==
There is a separate admin building dedicated to administration activities.

== List of vice-chancellors ==
Sequence	Name	Took over	Transfer the responsibility
1	Father Patrick Gaffney (anthropologist), CSC	8 August 2017	present

=== Library ===
The NDUB library has over 700 square feet (65 m^{2}) floor area on the southeastern side of the campus. It is the first fully automated university library in Bangladesh and uses its own library management software. As of August 2021, the library holds 9500 books, 500 online books, 600 bound journals (Foreign and local) and magazines, 90 CD-ROM databases and books, 226 DVDs and videos, 19 audio cassettes, and other resources.

== Student life and facilities ==
=== Student body ===
The university has about 8000 regular students.

=== Facilities ===
- NDUB Language Center
- Computer Communications Laboratories
- Digital Systems Laboratory
- Software Engineering Laboratory

=== Health services ===
Health services are provided by a medical center at the campus.

=== Events ===
- International Career Summit
- Photography Festival
- Cultural Events
- NDUB CSE Fest 2021
- Father Benjamin Inter-University Basketball Tournament

== Athletics ==
The university encourages students to participate in various games and sports. The Games and Sports Committee, which consists of student and staff members, organizes the annual athletic competition.

== Magazines, journals and research bulletins ==
The university publishes a journal called NDUB Research Journal 2020

- Journal of the Faculty of Science and Technology
- NDUB Bulletin
- NDUB Daystar: 2018-2019
- NDUB Research Journal 2020
- Journal of the Faculty of Business Administration

== Recognition ==
The academic programs of the university are recognized by the following organizations:

- University Grants Commission (Bangladesh) UGC (University Grants Commission, Bangladesh)

== Ranking ==
University rankings

Global – Overall
- QS World: 8,356 (2021)

Regional – Overall
- QS Asia: 4,356 (2021)

In 2022, the university ranked 8,356 in the university rankings published by Webometrics Ranking of World Universities. It ranked 63rd out of Bangladeshi universities.

== Extracurricular clubs ==
The university has seven extracurricular clubs: NDUB Drama and Film, NDUB English Club, NDUB Debate Club, NDUB Law Club, NDUB CSE Club, NDUB Business Club, and NDUB Cultural Club.

== Notre Dame Centre for Modern Languages ==
- English
- French
- German
- Japanese
- Chinese
- Turkish

== Affiliation and collaboration ==
Notre Dame University Bangladesh is a member of and has active collaboration with the following institutions:

- Ministry of Education (Bangladesh)
- University Grants Commission (Bangladesh) (UGC)
- University of Notre Dame
- The University of Notre Dame Australia
- Notre Dame University - Louaize
- Notre Dame of Maryland University
- Notre Dame College
- Loma Linda University
- Notre Dame College Mymensingh

== Financial aid ==
Notre Dame University Bangladesh was founded to support financially disadvantaged students. One of the early donors was the scholarship program. The university has developed several scholarship programs for national and international students. The Open Society Foundation and the Open Society University Network have supported student activities and education.

== Convocation ==
- NDUB 1st Convocation on 19 August 2021

== Academic session ==
- Spring: January to April
- Summer: May to August
- Fall: September to December
