= Yves-Marie Péan =

Haitian clergyman

His Excellency, The Most Reverend Yves-Marie Péan, C.S.C.
- Bishop of Les Gonaïves
- Diocese: Diocese of Les Gonaïves
- Appointed: May 21, 2002
- Installed: July 30, 2003

Orders
- Ordination: October 16, 1983
- Consecration: October 13, 2002 by François Gayot, Emmanuel Constant, and Hubert Constant

Personal details
- Born: Pilate, Nord, Haiti

Yves-Marie Péan, C.S.C., (born May 25, 1954) is a Haitian clergyman of the Catholic Church who has served as Bishop of Les Gonaïves since 2003.

== Biography ==
Péan was born in Pilate, Haiti as the second of four children of Dacius and Carmelie. After secondary school, he entered the novitiate of the Congregation of Holy Cross. He made his first vows on September 8. 1976, and his final profession on August 12, 1983. He was ordained a priest for the Congregation on October 16, 1983. After serving as a parish pastor for six years, he was assigned as Master of Novices for the community. He then went to Rome to study at the Gregorian University. He received a license and doctorate in Spiritual Theology. Upon returning, he was director of the scholasticate in Port-au-Prince from 1993 to 1995. From 1995 to 1997, he was pastor of the Parish of St. Rose of Lima in Pilate. In 1997, he was named rector of the philosophy section of the Notre Dame Major Seminary in Port-au-Prince.

On May 21, 2002, he was appointed Coadjutor Bishop of Les Gonaïves. He was consecrated as a bishop on October 13, 2002, by François Gayot, Emmanuel Constant, and Hubert Constant. He ascended to the bishopric of Les Gonaïves upon the retirement of Emmanuel Constant on July 20, 2003.
