= Flavian Laplante =

Servant of God Flavian Laplante CSC
- Born: 27 July 1907; St.-Louis-de-Richelieu, Quebec, Canada
- Died: 19 June 1981 (aged 73); Diang, Bangladesh

Flavian Laplante (1907–1981) was a religious brother of the Congregation of Holy Cross and a missionary who worked in Bangladesh from 1932 until 1981. He was a teacher and then a headmaster in different Catholic schools in the districts of Barisal, Noakhali and Chittagong. Later he was involved with the socio-economic development of the Jolodash community. He founded Miriam Ashram at Diang, on the 1 Karnaphuly River. In 1978, he also built a grotto with the statue of Our Lady of Lourdes and turned it into a shrine of Our Lady of Lourdes.

== Life ==
Flavian Laplante was born on 27 July 1907 in St.-Louis-de-Richelieu, Quebec, Canada to Honoré Laplante and Louise Théroux. He was the seventh child of nine.

Flavian joined Congregation of Holy Cross at the age of 16. He took the name, Brother Flavian, on 15 August 1923. He made his perpetual vows on 16 August 1928 and served at the Notre Dame College in Quebec as a teacher and dorm supervisor.

Flavian was assigned to the Congregation's mission in East Bengal in 1932. André Bessette remarked when he was leaving for his mission, "How fortunate you are in becoming a missionary. I envy you." He arrived at Chittagong in East Bengal on 1 December 1932. His first assignment was at a high school in Padrishibpur. Besides construction of the school he also taught at the school and later on was appointed as a principal. In May 1942 he moved to Chittagong, when Japan was conducting air raids, and stayed there during the war. He started a project for fisherman to get new boats after World War II. He also started an orphanage at Diang.

From 1957 to 1962 he was sent to Noakhali. In Diang he renamed the settlement there "Miriam ashram" ("Marian hermitage"). He also started a women's promotion center with the help of the Sisters of the Holy Cross. The "Kalidaha Fishing Project" was started in 1975 to help fisherman motorize their boats and founded a technical school to give them the skills to build and repair their own boats. On 24 December 1976 LaPlante retired to the life of a hermit.

Laplante died in Bangladesh on 19 June 1981 after prolonged illness.

== Beatification process ==
Flavian Laplante was declared a Servant of God on 13 February 2009.
