= Sisters of Providence (Ruillé-sur-Loir, France) =

Sisters of Providence of Ruillé-sur-Loir, France
- Formation: 1806
- Type: religious institute
- Headquarters: Ruillé-sur-Loir, Sarthe, France
- Location: France, England, Netherlands, Belgium, Madagascar, Sri Lanka
- Superior General: Sister Martine Meuwissen, S.P.
- Website: Sisters of Providence of Ruillé sur Loire, France

The Sisters of Providence of Ruillé-sur-Loir or the Sœurs de la Providence de Ruillé-sur-Loir, France, are a congregation of Roman Catholic Religious Sisters founded in 1806 by Jacques-Francois Dujarié.

== History ==
During the French Revolution religious practice was banned, churches secularised, seminaries closed, and religious executed. Jacques François Dujarié was ordained in secret on 26 December 1795, and ministered as an "underground priest" in Ruillé-sur-Loir and the surrounding area. Although the Concordat of 1801 lifted prohibitions, the effect of the Revolution on French Catholicism and education was severe. In January 1803 Fr.Dujarié was named parish priest of Ruillé.

Three miles from the village, there were scattered farm houses of families in need of care. In 1806 Abbe Dujarie was able to recruit two laywomen and had a small house built for them, "The Little Providence". They set up a school to teach the young children, and a dispensary to give basic medical assistance to the poor people of the neighbourhood. By 1808, there were a dozen members whose work had spread to neighboring parishes.

=== Expansion ===
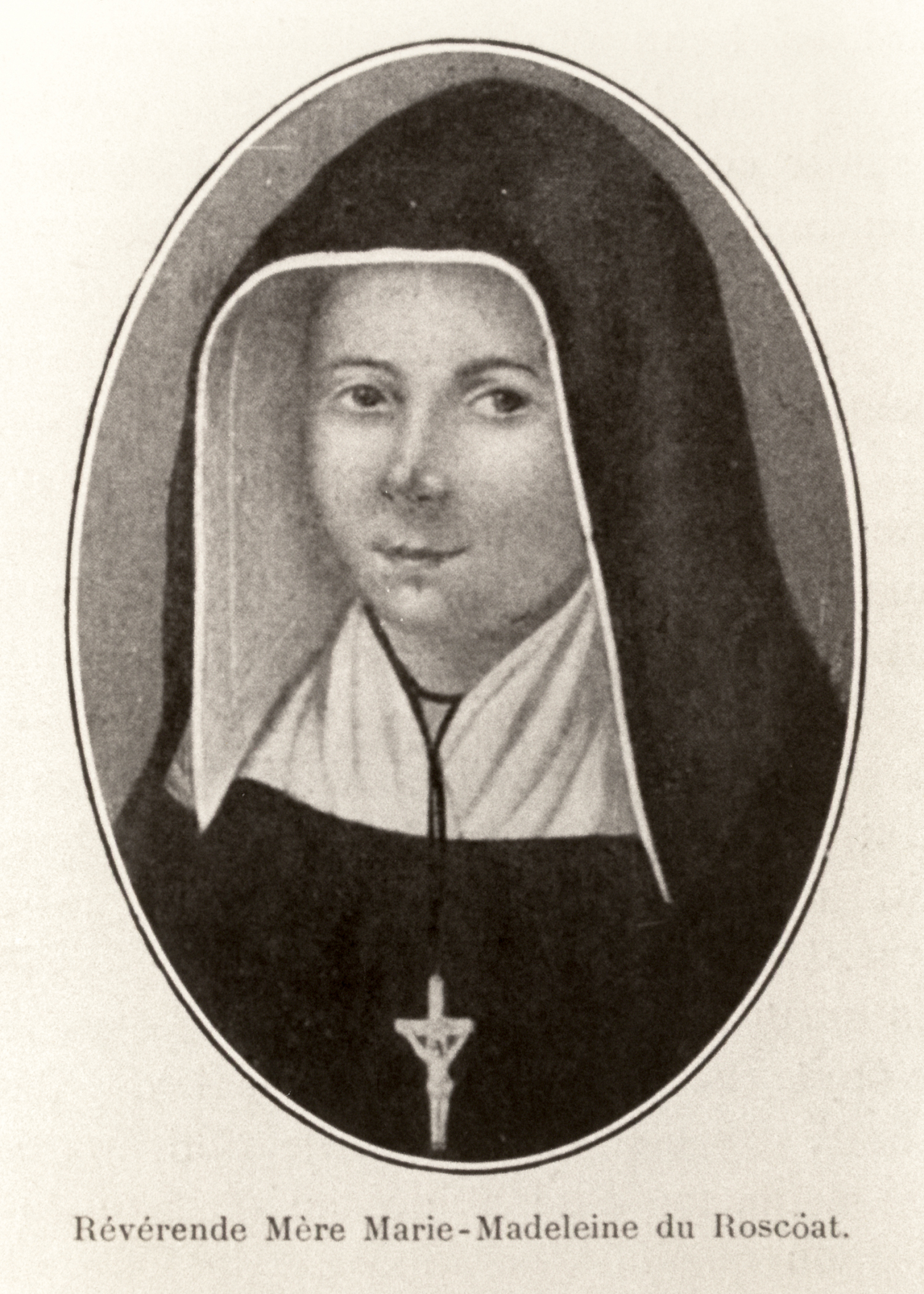
Mother Marie-Madeleine du Roscoät

In 1820 Zoe du Roscöat (Mother Marie-Madeleine) from Pléhédel, in Brittany was chosen as first Superior General. Upon the death of Mother Marie-Madeleine in 1820, Perrine Aimée Lecor (Mother Marie) from the Island of Brehat in Brittany was named as her successor. Under her leadership numerous communities were opened in France to serve the poor, the children and the sick.

By 1840 there were more than 40 houses in France. That year Theodore Guerin and several other Sisters of Providence went to Indiana in the United States, where they became the autonomous congregation of the Sisters of Providence of Saint Mary-of-the-Woods. Towards the end of the 19th century, the French State secularised the schools, and religious were forbidden to teach so groups of Sisters of Providence moved into England, Belgium and Holland where they set up schools.

In 1901 the Sisters of Providence were invited by the parish priest of Woodhall Spa, Fr Goddard, a Belgian, to start a house in his parish. The sisters established St. Joseph's School in Lincoln and staffed it from 1911 to 1983. St. Joseph's later merged with the Lincoln Cathedral School and Stonefield House to form the Minster School. Sisters from Lincoln were instrumental in establishing a convent in Sri Lanka in 1948. In 1964 Europeans were expelled from Sri Lanka, so a group of Sisters made a foundation in Madagascar.

As of 2022, the Sisters of Providence of Ruillé-sur-Loir currently minister in France, England, Belgium, and Sri Lanka, and Madagascar. Sisters of Providence in England carry out various apostolates in London, Maidstone, Oxford, Witney, Lincoln and Woodhall Spa.
