= Notre Dame de Sainte Croix, Le Mans =

Catholic church located in Le Mans, France

Notre Dame de Sainte Croix Église Notre-Dame-de-Sainte-Croix
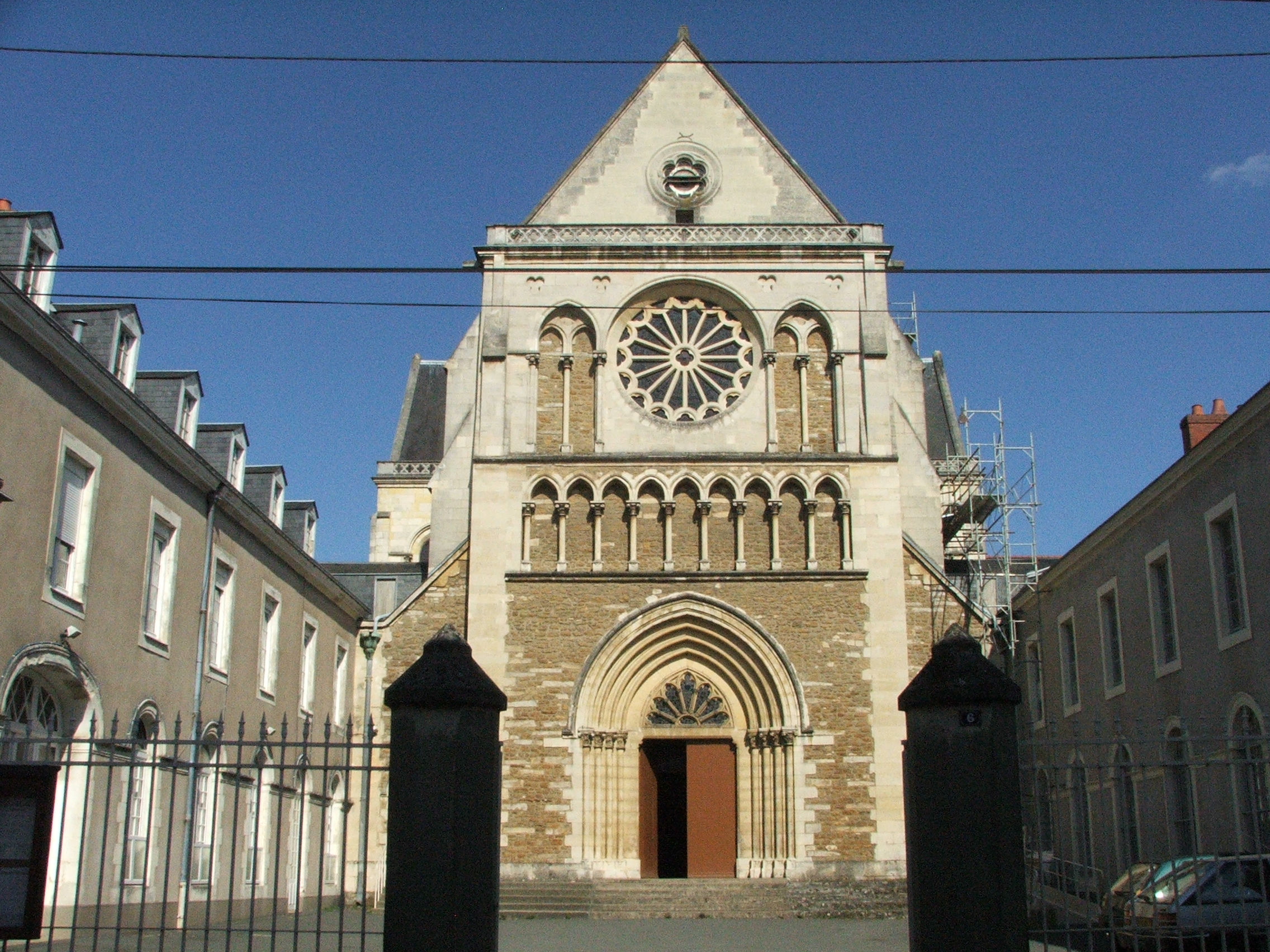

Religion
- Affiliation: Roman Catholic Church
- Province: Diocese of Le Mans
- Region: Pays de la Loire
- Rite: Roman Rite
- Status: Active

Location
- Location: Le Mans, France
- Interactive map of Notre Dame de Sainte Croix; Église Notre-Dame-de-Sainte-Croix
- Coordinates: 48.0036°N 0.2101°E

Architecture
- Type: church
- Style: Roman, French Gothic
- Completed: 1857

Notre Dame de Sainte Croix is a Catholic church located in the city of Le Mans, France. The church gives its name to the neighborhood itself. It was the first site of the Congregation of Holy Cross.

== History ==
=== Ancient church ===
The Sainte-Croix district was initially a suburb of the city of Le Mans. For a long time there were quality vineyards, tended by religious orders east of the city. The early church was built in the 6th century by Bertrand. It was first used as a chapel for a makeshift hospice. It was set up as a parish at the end of the 10th century, a period certainly coinciding with the deterioration and the end of the hospice. The church was built on a hill facing west, where it remained until its destruction in 1794.

=== Basil Moreau and the Holy Cross ===
At the beginning of the 1800s the site, then called Notre-Dame de Bel-Air, comprised a main house with additional buildings and a surrounding property of over 36,000 square meters. On 24 December 1832, the site was given as a gift to Father Basil Moreau by Jobbé Delile, an honorary canon of the Cathedral of Le Mans.

Basil Moreau, a priest in the diocese of Le Mans, founded the Auxiliary Priests in 1835, the same year he was entrusted with the Brothers of Saint Joseph, a group founded earlier by Jacques Dujarié. Moreau renamed the site Notre-Dame de Sainte-Croix, and on 1 November 1835, the Brothers of Saint Joseph was installed there. After a building expansion and renovation in the spring of 1837 he also brought to the property the Auxiliary Priests, which had been formally united with the Brothers to form the Association of the Holy Cross (which later developed into the Congregation of Holy Cross). A year later, they were joined by a community of women, the Marianites of Holy Cross.

=== Building of the church and school ===
The church was then in a neogothic style and its architect was Abbé Tournesac. The cornerstone of the church of Notre-Dame de Sainte-Croix was blessed by Monseigneur Jean-Baptiste Bouvier, bishop of Le Mans, on 30 March 1842, in the presence of priests, brothers, and students of Sainte-Croix. The church was consecrated on 17 June 1857, by Cardinal François Donnet, archbishop of Bordeaux, with the presence of nine other bishops and of Dom Prosper Guéranger, Abbot of Solesmes.

In 1837, Moreau also brought to the site the pupils of the pensionnat, a primary boarding school part of the educational mission of his congregation, the Institution Notre-Dame de Sainte-Croix. In 1838 the school started to teach Latin and in 1839 it received the rank of "Institution", together with the teaching of the humanities. In 1843, Moreau established an academy of academic excellence, as well as a conference of the Saint Vincent de Paul Society. In 1845, the institution began to admit day-students and in 1849, the institution was granted "full teaching rights", which included the possibility to teach rhetoric and philosophy.

=== Later history ===
In 1868 the Congregation decided to move its headquarters to Notre Dame, Indiana and decided to sell all properties in Le Mans, including the school and church. The properties were sold at auction on 2 October 1869, and were purchased by the Marquis de Nicolay, who then gave possession of the church and school to the Jesuits. The latter installed new windows in the church and converted the chapter room into the Chapel of Christ the King.Yet, the Jesuits were soon prohibited by engaging in education by decree of the French minister for public education, Jules Ferry on 29 March 1880. Further, a 1901 law removed legal recognition from religious congregations and the 1905 French law on the Separation of the Churches and the State led to the abandonment of the property by the Jesuits and the transfer of school to the building of former Capucin convent several hundred meters away. The school was then moved for a third and final time to rue des Vignes (now rue Antoine de Saint-Exupéry), where it today stands the Lycée Sainte-Croix. The school buildings at the Sainte Croix site instead were given to the army to become barracks (Caserne Mangin) in 1908. Eventually they became private apartments in 2016.

The church building was rescued by intervention of Cardinal Georges Grente, bishop of Le Mans from 1918–1959, who helped the Congregation of Holy Cross retake possession of it in 1931. The church was renovated with canopy over the main altar and three haut-reliefs: one of the Holy Family in the south transept, one of the Sacred Heart with Saint John Eudes and Saint Margaret Mary Alacoque in the north transept, and a third one (once over the main altar) is on the wall of the south aisle. These are all works by Georges Saupique. Reconsecration took place on 9 November 1937.
