= Bandura Holy Cross School & Collage =

Bandura Holy Cross School and College
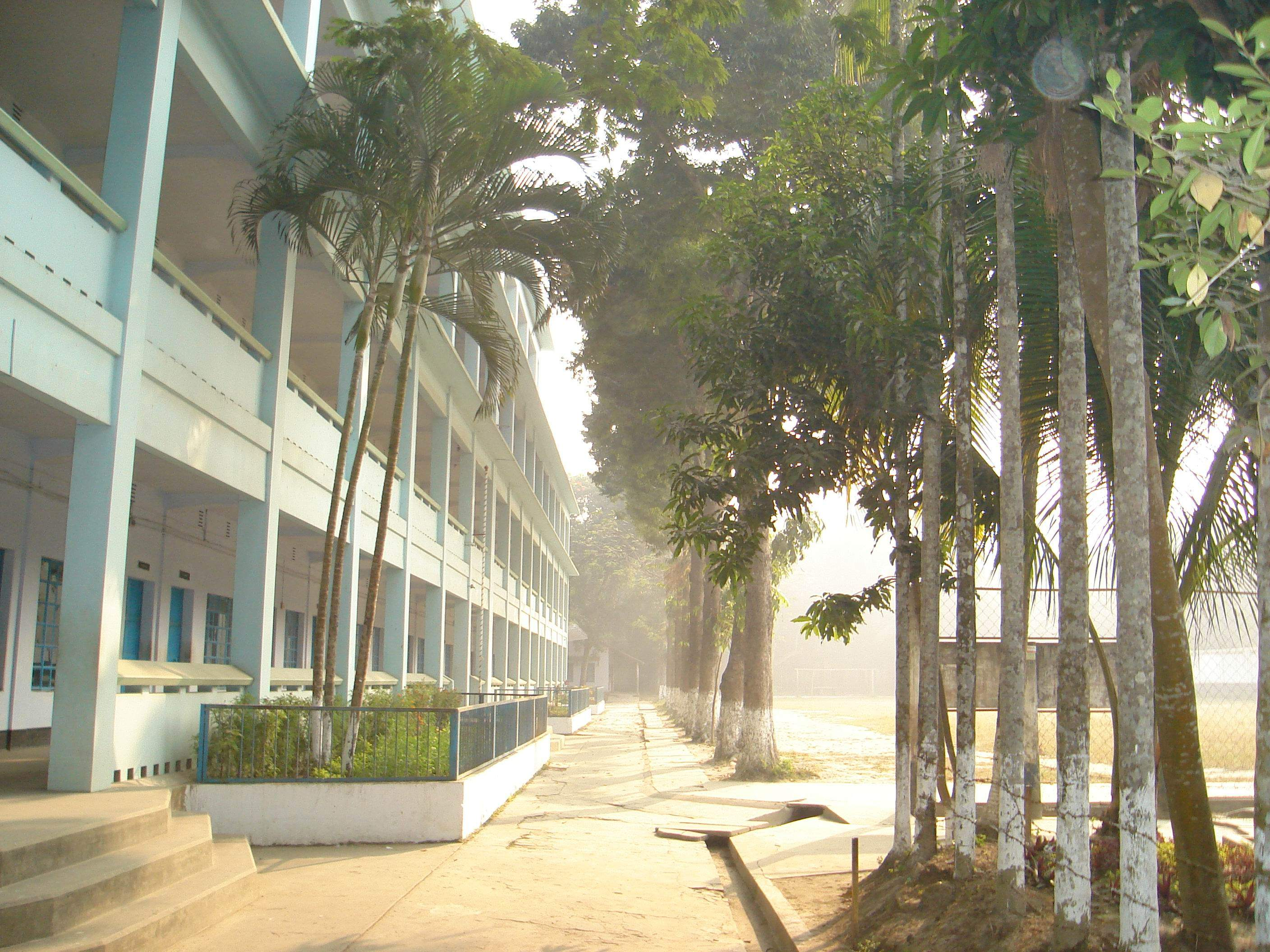

Location
- Coordinates: 23°39′34.92″N 90°06′37.44″E

Information
- Type: Missionaries
- Established: 1912
- Grades: class 1 -12
- Campus size: 5

Bandura Holy Cross High School (Bengali: বান্দুরা হলিক্রশ হাই স্কুল অ্যান্ড কলেজ) is a Catholic secondary school founded in 1912 by the Congregation of Holy Cross at Bandura in Nababgonj (Nawabgonj) Thana of the Dhaka district of Bangladesh.

== History ==
Bandura Holy Cross School & Collage was established in 1912.

Bandura Holy Cross School & Collage is situated on the bank of the river Ichhamoti, near Bandura Bus Stand and Launch Terminal. For an outstanding contribution in the education sector, Bandura Holy Cross High School was awarded National Best School Award by the government of the People's Republic of Bangladesh. It is under the Dhaka Education Board. Banglapedia identified it as a notable school in Dhaka District. Br. Bhuban Benjamin Costa joined the school in 2014.

Brother John Rozario. who served as the principal of Bandura Holy Cross School & Collage would later serve as the principal at St. Gregory's High School and College and St. Joseph Higher Secondary School; the first Bangladeshi to serve as the principal in three schools of the congregation. He died in 2017.

The Principal of Bandura Holy Cross School and College, Brother Albert Ratna, denied allegations of charging extra tuition in 2020.

== Management ==
Bandura Holy Cross High School is run by the Holy Cross Brothers of Bangladesh. They are the head of the school managing body. Representatives from locally prominent people and guardians of students are also in the governing structure.

In the school there are 5 classes (6 to 10).

== Alumni ==
- Theotonius Amal Ganguly
