= Saint Joseph School of Industrial Trades =

Catholic school in Bangladesh

Coordinates: 23.7132°N 90.4217°E

Saint Joseph School of Industrial Trades is a Catholic secondary trade school founded in Dhaka, Bangladesh in 1954 by the Congregation of Holy Cross. The training it offers includes carpentry, machinery, welding and sheet metal work, repairing and rewinding of electrical appliances.
