= St Vincent De Paul Church, Katapady =

St Vincent De Paul Church
- sa visent paulace firguz
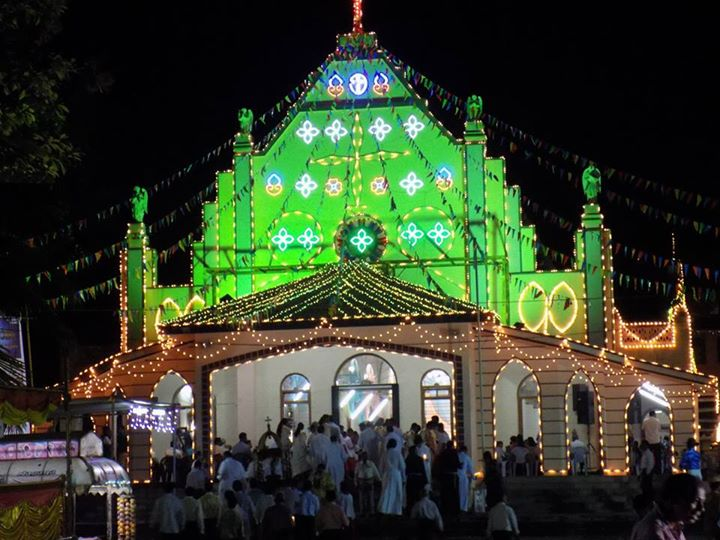
- St Vincent De Paul Church
- 13.289024°N 74.752806°E
- Location: katapady, Udupi District
- Country: India
- Denomination: Roman Catholic

History
- Founded: May 13, 1948 - but see note below
- Founder: John A.P Miranda

Architecture
- Functional status: Active

Administration
- Diocese: Udupi
- Parish: Katapady

Clergy
- Bishop: Gerald Isaac Lobo

St Vincent De Paul Church (SVP) is a Roman Catholic church in Katapady in Udupi district, Karnataka, India.

== History ==
The church was established on 18 May 1948 by Rev. Fr. Rosario Fernades. The present church building was built by Rev. Fr. John A P Miranda in 1957. Starting in the year 2000 the church has been run by priests from Congregation of Holy Cross.

== List of priests ==
1. Fr. Rosario Fernandes
2. Fr. J.P Tellis
3. Fr. A.F D'souza
4. Fr. John A.P Miranda
5. Fr. Frederick Lobo
6. Fr. Golbert Noranha
7. Fr. Charles D'souza
8. Fr. Arthur C.A D'souza
9. Fr. John Fernandes
10. Fr. Henry Fernandes
11. Fr. Wilfred Fernandes
12. Fr. Norbert D'mello
13. Asst. Fr. Aloysius Gonsalves
14. Fr. Ronald Fernades
15. Fr. Lawrence D'almedia
16. Fr. Ronson D'Souza
17. Fr. Rajesh Pasanna, CSC
