= Jacques-François Dujarié =

- Born: 9 December 1767; Rennes-en-Grenouilles
- Died: 17 February 1838 (aged 70); Le Mans
- Occupation: Catholic Priest,
- Movement: Brothers of St. Joseph, Sisters of Providence (Ruillé-sur-Loir, France), Sisters of Providence of Saint Mary-of-the-Woods & Congregation of Holy Cross

Jacques-François Dujarié (1767-1838) was a French Catholic priest who served the people of France at the start of the 19th century. To this end, he founded a congregation of religious sisters and another one of brothers.

== Early life ==
Dujarié was born in Sainte-Marie-du-Bois, Mayenne, France on December 9, 1767, the son of Jacques and Françoise Leroux Dujarié. His was a religious family. He studied at the collège in Domfront, founded by the Eudists. He was a student at the Sulpician seminary in Angers when the French Revolution broke out in 1789. The parishes, convents and monasteries that had provided most of the country’s education and health care were closed and their assets seized. In 1791, when the Revolutionary government required all clergy to take an oath of loyalty to the state, the seminary disbanded and Dujarié returned home. Priests and religious who did not take the oath were forced into hiding to avoid imprisonment, deportation, or even execution.

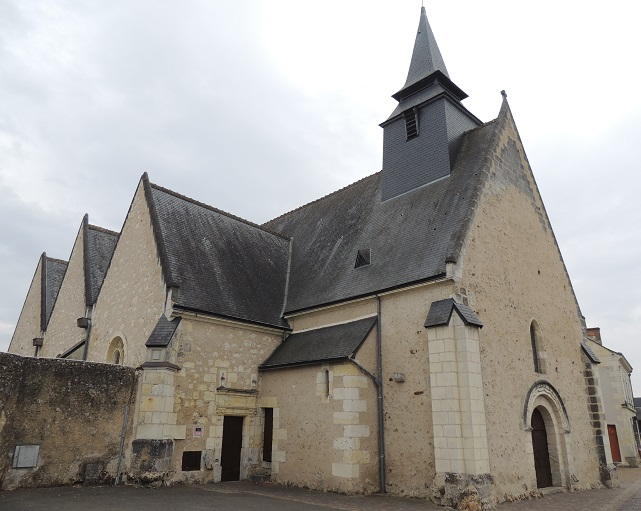
Église Saint-Pierre et Saint-Paul, Ruillé-sur-Loir

In July 1795, Dujarié resumed his studies for the priesthood in secret with Joseph Jacquet de la Haye, pastor in Ruillé-sur-Loir. On December 26 of that same year, he was secretly ordained a priest in Paris. He celebrated his first Mass in the middle of the night in a barn outside of Ruillé-sur-Loir.

Throughout the Revolutionary period he ministered to the Catholic faithful as an "underground priest" throughout northwestern France, particularly in the countryside around Ruillé-sur-Loir, in the former province of Maine. He worked as a weaver, and disguised himself as a lemonade peddler as he went out through the countryside tending the people.

After the restoration of the Catholic Church, Abbé Dujarié was installed as parish priest of St. Peter’s Church in Ruillé-sur-Loir on 27 May 1803. He worked tirelessly to rebuild the parish, but he became profoundly concerned about the state of affairs in which the Revolution had left the Church and the state of education, especially in the poorest region outside the town, known as the "Heights".

== The Sisters of Providence ==
In 1806 Dujarié recruited two young women of the region to teach girls and care for the sick. He had the Little House of Providence built for them in that locale. Immediately the women set up a school, dispensary and a routine of visiting and caring for the ill. Within just a few years the group of women spread out to surrounding parishes to carry out Dujarié's vision. As their numbers grew, Dujarié sent them to Anne de la Girouardière, founder of the Daughters of the Sacred Heart of Mary for formation in religious life and training in the care of the sick.

The group had grown so much by March 1821 that he began the building of a larger house for them on the outskirts of the town, called the Great House of Providence. In 1831 they were recognized as a religious congregation, called the Sisters of Providence. Their motto became: Deus providebit (God will provide).

== The Brothers of St. Joseph ==
With the encouragement of Johann Michael Josef von Pidoll de Quitenbach, Bishop of Le Mans, in 1820 Dujarié also founded the Brothers of St. Joseph for the education of rural boys. Similarly dedicated to the renewal of education and the Church, the Brothers by his plan would share in the resources of the Sisters of Providence. This the sisters objected to and had him removed from a position of responsibility for their Congregation.

Dujarié housed the early recruits in the presbytery at Ruillé, until the eventual construction of “Le Grand Saint-Joseph” in 1824. By 1835, the Brothers of St. Joseph had opened as many as 60 schools throughout northwestern France. Still, they had not been formed into a religious community with a novitiate or recognition from the Church. Besides teaching, Dujarié wished the brothers should ease the burden of curés, by assisting as sacristans.

Dujarie, on account of his failing health, handed responsibility for the Brothers to the Abbé (now Blessed) Basil Moreau, who had already preached retreats for the Brothers of St. Joseph. In August 1835 Jean-Baptiste Bouvier, Bishop of Le Mans presided over a ceremony in the chapel of the Grand Saint-Joseph, in which Dujarie presented Moreau as the new head of the organization.

In the same year Moreau had founded a group of "Auxiliary Priests" within the Le Mans Diocese. In November, he moved the Brothers of St. Joseph to Notre-Dame de Bel-Air in Le Mans. After a building expansion and renovation in the spring of 1837 he also brought to the property the Auxiliary Priests, and they were formally united with the Brothers to form the Association of the Holy Cross.

== Death ==
In October 1836, Dujarié retired to live with the Brothers at their motherhouse in Le Mans. He died there on 17 February 1838, the founder of two communities which would soon become three congregations: the Sisters of Providence (Ruillé-sur-Loir, France), the Sisters of Providence of Saint Mary-of-the-Woods, (Indiana), and the Brothers of the Congregation of Holy Cross

Dujarié was buried in the cemetery of the Brothers. His remains, however, were transferred, at the Sisters' request to their motherhouse in Ruillé on 31 August 1873.
