= Peter Joseph Hurth =

German-American Catholic bishop

His Excellency Peter Joseph Hurth C.S.C.
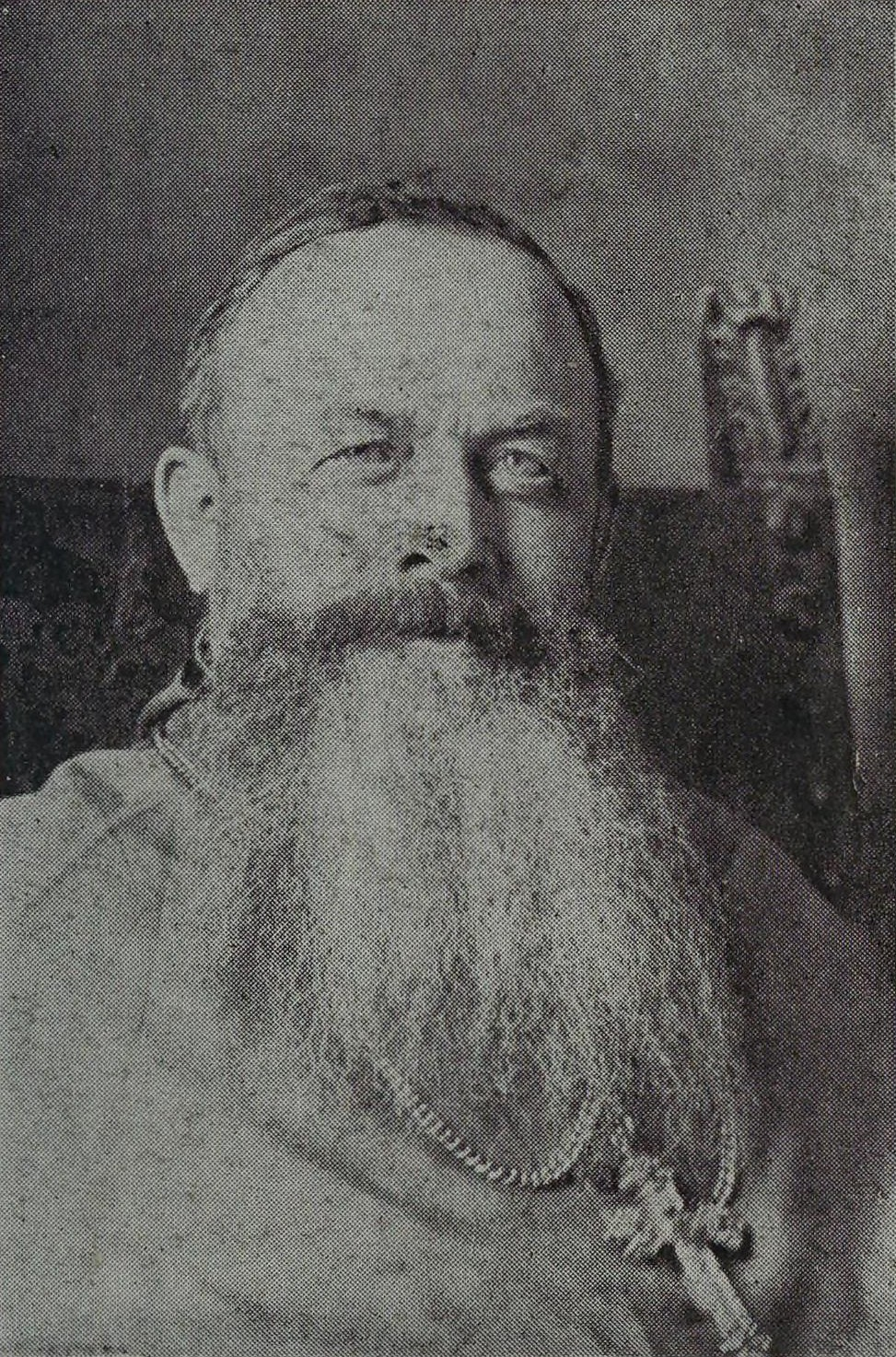
- Hurth in 1913

Titular Archbishop of Bosra
- In office November 12, 1926 – August 1, 1935
- Preceded by: Martín García y Alcocer
- Succeeded by: Iwannis Gandour

24th Bishop of Nueva Segovia
- In office January 7, 1913 – November 12, 1926
- Preceded by: James Jordan Carroll
- Succeeded by: Santiago Caragnan Sancho

2nd Bishop of Dhaka
- In office 1894–1909
- Preceded by: Augustin Louage
- Succeeded by: Frederick Linneborn

2nd President of St. Edward's University
- In office 1886–1894
- Preceded by: Peter J. Franciscus
- Succeeded by: Edward Murphy

Personal details
- Born: March 30, 1857 Nittel, Prussia
- Died: August 1, 1935 (aged 78) Manila, Philippine Islands
- Resting place: Vigan Cathedral
- Education: University of Notre Dame

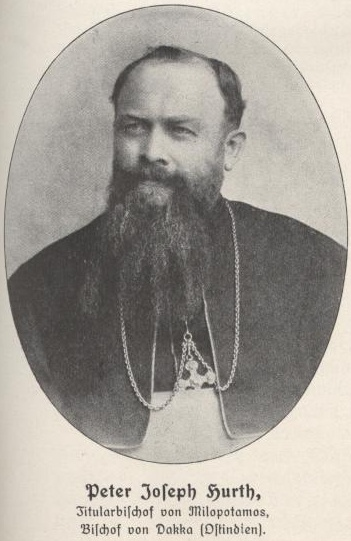
Archbishop Peter Joseph Hurth, C.S.C., S.T.D.

Peter Joseph Hurth, C.S.C., S.T.D. (30 March 1857 – 1 August 1935) was a Catholic priest of the Congregation of Holy Cross, a diocesan bishop in the Philippines and British India, and a titular archbishop.

Of German nationality and later naturalized as an American, he was the first American Catholic bishop sent to Asia.

Throughout his life, Pierre-Joseph Hurth was a pioneer and a builder. Emigrating to the United States at the age of 17, he joined the French Congregation of Holy Cross at the University of Notre Dame (Indiana). He later directed two colleges, Saint Joseph’s (Cincinnati) and Saint Edward’s (Texas). He turned the latter into one of the pioneering educational institutions of the Southern states.

He continued his work as a builder as the second Bishop of Dacca (now Dhaka, Bangladesh). He became known for rebuilding his diocese, which had been destroyed by an earthquake and a cyclone in 1897. From 1913 to 1926, he served in the Diocese of Nueva Segovia in the Philippines, where he held an important place in the local Church. In 1916, he was even considered for the position of Archbishop of Manila, though unsuccessfully. Pierre-Joseph Hurth is best known for his devotion to the Eucharist. He organized the first National Eucharistic Congress of the United States in July 1894.

He died on Thursday, August 1, 1935, assisted by the Servant of God William Finnemann. His body rests in the sacristy of Saint Paul’s Cathedral in Vigan.

== Early years ==
Peter Joseph Hurth was born on 30 March 1857 in Nittel, Prussia (now Germany), across the Moselle River from Luxembourg. At that time, Nittel was in the Rheinprovinz, but today it belongs to the state of Rhineland-Palatinate. Peter was the youngest of three children of Peter Hurth (1822–1873) and his wife, Susanna Wolf (1816–1894).

Peter Joseph Hurth distinguished himself very early by his intellectual gifts. At the age of twelve, the priest of his parish had already recruited him as a catechism tutor. Showing at an early age his desire to become a priest, he was prevented from doing so by Bismarck’s anti-religious policy, better known as the Kulturkampf. Thus, at the age of seventeen, in order to follow his vocation, he decided to leave for the United States and join a French missionary congregation — the Congregation of Holy Cross. This congregation, founded a few years earlier by Blessed Basil Moreau, had already established missions across the Atlantic.

In the spring of 1874, three days before his 17th birthday, he left for America. In Antwerp, he boarded the Red Star Line steamer, the "Switzerland". When he arrived in New York City in the morning of 8 May, so many of his companions at Castle Garden were Luxembourgers that he was mistaken for one of them. The mistake did not bother Hurth. Neither did the misspelling of his name – "Pierre Hurt".

Hurth had come to continue his studies so he went to his destination, the University of Notre Dame in Indiana. There he also joined the Congregation of Holy Cross (C.S.C.). As a Brother, he worked as an assistant instructor of the Latin and Greek languages at the university.

During his novitiate at Notre Dame University, he was quickly noticed for his outstanding qualities and was appointed assistant to the master of novices. Gradually, he was entrusted with more and more responsibilities. In 1878, he became head of the Labor Manual School of the University of Notre Dame.

On 30 March 1880 he was ordained to the priesthood. He also graduated from the university. Only one of his degrees was known to be a S.T.D. He had it by 1908, when he wrote an article for an American encyclopedia.

== College President ==
In September 1880, Hurth was the President of St. Joseph’s Commercial College (now the College of Mount Saint Joseph) in Cincinnati, Ohio, making him very likely the youngest university president in the United States at the time.

He left as an American citizen and with a new passport. He had been naturalized there on 31 March 1883. His passport application described him as 5 ft 7 in (170 cm) tall, with gray eyes, blond hair, fair complexion, a stub-nose, a wide mouth, a round chin, and a round face. His trademark, a full, flowing beard, would come later.

Hurth’s next stop was in Austin, Texas, where he served as the President of St. Edward’s College (now St. Edward’s University) in Austin, Texas, for eight years, from 1886 to 1894. Alongside his academic duties, he became an influential speaker and tireless missionary throughout the southern states. He was often invited to preach sermons, and in 1891 — an exceptional privilege for a Catholic priest — he was asked to deliver the opening address of the parliamentary session of the Texas House of Representatives.

Furthermore, to encourage Catholic priests in the southern United States, he invited them to join the Eucharistic League of Priests, a pious association directed by the Fathers of the Blessed Sacrament founded by Father Pierre-Julien Eymard. His devotion to the Eucharist led him, in 1894, to organize with Father Bede Maler, O.S.B., the first Eucharistic convention in the United States, held at Notre Dame University in Indiana — an event that foreshadowed the future National Eucharistic Congresses of the United States.

== The Bishop of Dacca ==
On 26 June 1894, the Holy Father, Pope Leo XIII, entrusted him with the episcopate of Dacca (now Dhaka, Bangladesh) in Eastern Bengal, British India, following the sudden death of the first bishop, Bishop Augustin Louage. He was the third of his Order to have had this position. He was consecrated to it on 16 September 1894 at the Basilica of the Sacred Heart, Notre Dame by the Bishop of Nashville, Tennessee, Joseph Rademacher, with the assistance from two other bishops, Henry Joseph Richter of Grand Rapids, Michigan and James Schwebach of La Crosse, Wisconsin. He left at midnight for a trip that would take him to New York City, to Rome for an audience with the Pope and eventually to Dacca. He was then thirty-seven years old, making him very likely the youngest bishop in the Church at that time. He was also the first American bishop ever sent on mission to Asian lands. With great courage, he left the United States — his second homeland, whose nationality he had acquired in 1883 — for British India. Having enjoyed success in the New World, his episcopate in Dacca, and later in the Philippines, would be marked by trials and desolation; yet he faced them with rare courage and energy.

During the first two years of his episcopate in Dacca, he consolidated the foundations of the Congregation of Holy Cross’s mission in Bengal. But before he could see the fruits of his work, a terrible earthquake — comparable to the Lisbon earthquake of the 18th century — struck in June 1897, destroying everything he had built. Confronted with this calamity, he exclaimed, like the holy man Job: “The Lord has given, the Lord has taken away.” Then came the time for rebuilding, in which he personally took part, drawing up the plans for his own modest cathedral, smaller than those of Christian countries. He also decided to undertake a year-long tour of Western countries to raise funds and alert his Christian brethren to the desperate state of his diocese. He thus established networks in many Western nations.

Bishop Hurth was indeed a very sociable man who knew many prominent figures. It was during this time that he contracted malaria, a disease that would afflict him throughout his life, compounded later by varicose veins in one leg. Despite his illnesses, Bishop Hurth remained highly active both in his diocese and in the Church of India. For example, he participated in two major Eucharistic Congresses, in Goa and Bangalore, where he served as president. He was personally acquainted with Lord Kitchener, commander of the British Indian Army. In 1908, he wrote an article in English about his diocese for an American publication, The Catholic Encyclopedia. After several trips to Europe to restore his health, he was finally forced to resign on 15 February 1909, and had to wait two years of devoted service before his successor was appointed.

On the same day, he was appointed as the Titular Bishop of Milopotamus. His new title might be in Ancient Greece but he was in good company. The previous holder was an Englishman, Nicholas Wiseman, before he became a Cardinal and the first Archbishop of Westminster.

But Hurth did not forget India. In 1911, when he returned to Cincinnati, he was interviewed by a local newspaper. When he was asked about India, he said that, since the conditions were changing slowly in India, "it was only a question of time when caste would no longer exist and child marriage would be abolished." He was in the city for the 5th National Eucharistic Congress of the Catholic Church of America.

== The Bishop of Nueva Segovia ==
Hurth's coat of arms as Bishop of Nueva Segovia. The motto, "In verbo tuo laxabo rete," comes from Luke 5:5, and means "at thy word, I will let down the net."

To recover his strength, Monsignor Hurth travelled for two years through Germany, Italy, and the United States — he was indeed a great traveler. Then, Pope Pius X, who admired his remarkable organizational talents, appointed him Bishop of Nueva Segovia in Luzon, the largest of the islands, on 7 January 1913. In Vigan City, the see of the diocese, Hurth served for another 13 years. He remained there until 1926, when, at the age of sixty-nine, he was compelled to retire because of ill health.

His second tour was not quiet and uneventful. One reporter remarked that the Bishop had "the rather melancholy privilege of ruling the most afflicted diocese under the United States jurisdiction". His see had been devastated by revolutions, typhoons, earthquakes, cyclones and deserted by the missionary funds from Europe. The conditions were so bad – "verily in ruins" – that at least nineteen congregations did not have any buildings to hold their Masses and house their priests. So Bishop Hurth had to send out appeals everywhere for help. That was one of the reasons for his trip to the United States in late 1916 and early 1917.

His episcopate in the Philippines was also marked by the First World War, during which the authorities used his German origins as a pretext to persecute him, as well as the German missionaries of the Society of the Divine Word, who were expelled. It is said that, if not for this episode, Bishop Hurth would have become Archbishop of Manila.

On 12 November 1926, Hurth resigned.

== Retirement ==
Upon his retirement, Bishop Hurth was named a Papal Count, Assistant to the papal throne, and Titular Archbishop of Bosra. In recognition of his missionary devotion, Pope Pius XI invited him to celebrate Mass at the papal altar of Basilica of Saint Paul Outside the Walls — an honor granted only twice a year. He thus became the first bishop of his congregation ever to receive such a distinction.

Two weeks later, he was on his way back to America aboard an ocean liner. After many years in India and the Philippines, he was used to the tropical weather. But, one Saturday, just days from New York City, he went outside for a walk around the deck and a blast of cold air gave him a "heart shock". He had to be taken to the hospital in New York City straight from the piers. But he quickly recovered.

Bishop Hurth even felt healthy enough in 1927 to travel to Helena, Montana, and San Antonio, Texas. In Helena, he was the principal consecrator at the ordination of George Joseph Finnigan, C.S.C., as the Bishop of that city. But in San Antonio he was one of the observers at the consecration of Bishop Arthur Jerome Drossaerts as the first Archbishop of San Antonio.

In spite of all his travels to faraway lands, Hurth never forgot his hometown. He visited it twice, in 1898 and 1910. In 1910, he was in Augsburg for the 57th General Assembly of the Catholics of Germany so he was mentioned, along his portrait, in the assembly’s official commemorative program.

Despite his retirement, Bishop Hurth remained active and continued to travel across the world. He was present, for instance, at the International Eucharistic Congress in Sydney in 1928, presided over by Vladimir Ghika. After celebrating his golden jubilee of priesthood in 1930, he retired to Manila, where, from 1932 until his death, he became increasingly infirm, often exclaiming amid indescribable suffering: “Ah, if it were not for faith — if it were not for faith.”

He died on August 1, 1935, in Manila. A funeral service was held in the cathedral there, and he was laid to rest in St. Paul’s Cathedral in Vigan, where he remains buried to this day.

Hurth died in Manila on 1 August 1935.

== Legacy ==
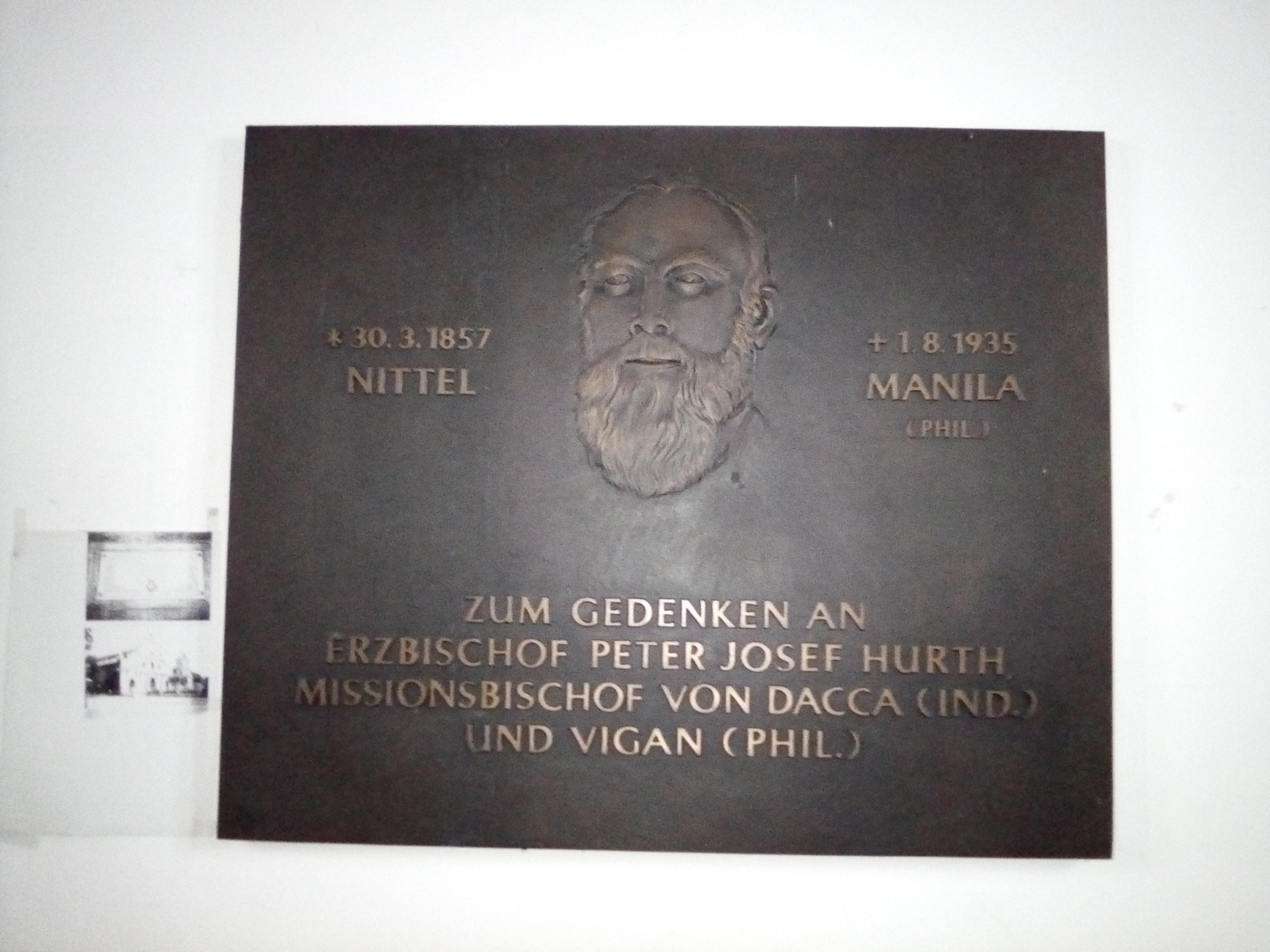
Memorial plaque in Köllig (Nittel)

In his birthplace, Nittel, there is a modern memorial plaque in the town's square for Archbishop Hurth.

== Literature ==
- (en) David Shavit: The United States in Asia: A Historical Dictionary, New York, Greenwood Press, 1990, ISBN 031326788X, p. 256, scan from the source
- (en) University of Notre Dame Archives: Guide to Manuscript Collections. Notre Dame, University of Notre Dame Press, 1993, p. 213; snippet from the source
- (de) Hans-Josef Wietor: Die Geschichte des Ortes Nittel [The History of the Place of Nittel], Ortschroniken des Trierer Landes, Nr. 33 [Chronicles of the Places of the Land of Trier, No. 33]. Nittel, Ortsgemeinde [Township of] Nittel, 2000, with an entire chapter about Archbishop Hurth (See the note about the book)
