= Holy Trinity High School (Chicago) =

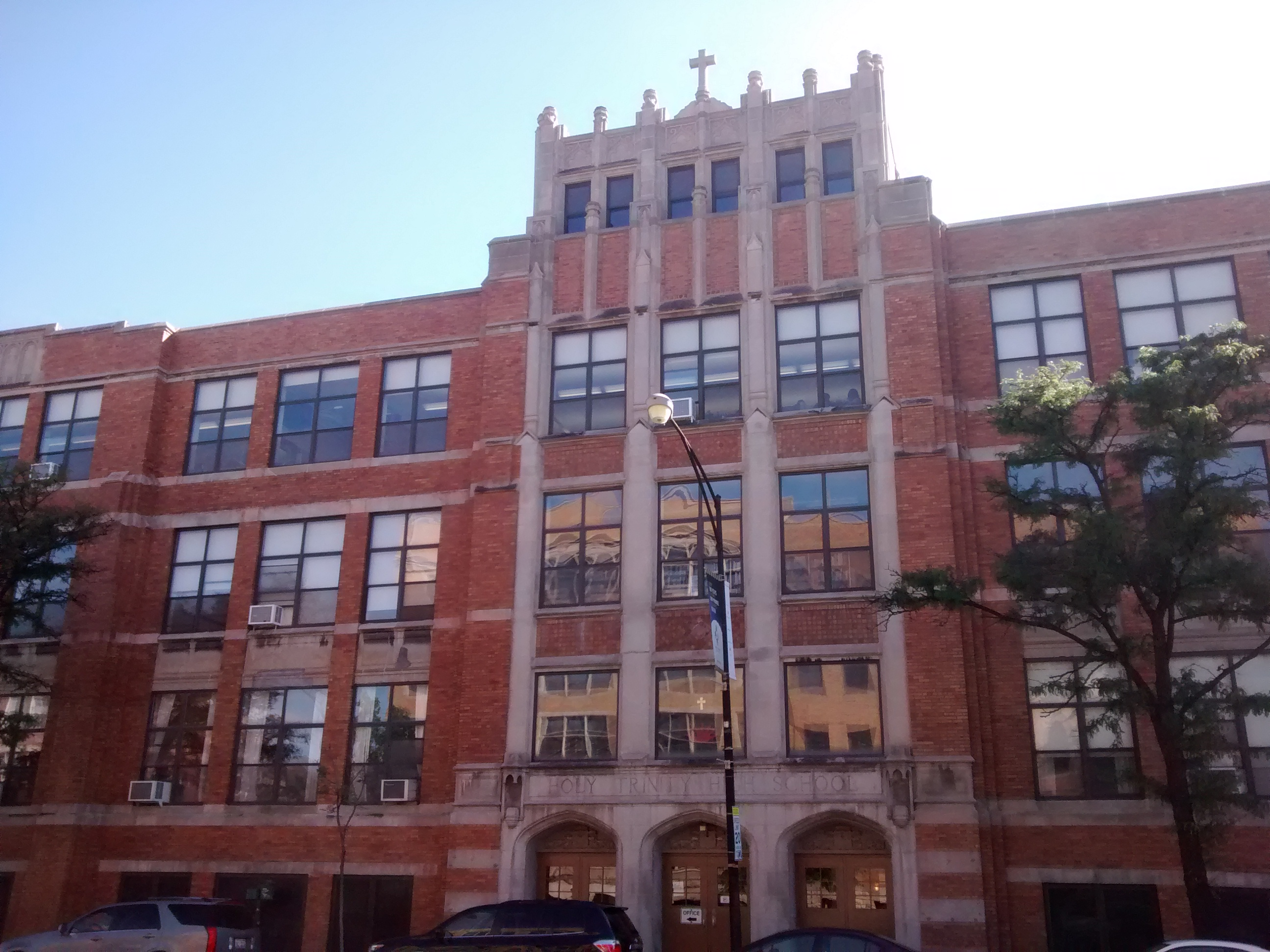

Location
- 1443 West Division Street; Chicago, Illinois 60642; United States; 41°54′11″N 87°39′51″W

Information
- Type: Private
- Denomination: Roman Catholic
- Established: 1910
- Founder: Brother Peter Hosinski, CSC
- Oversight: Archdiocese of Chicago
- President: Elizabeth Torres
- Principal: Maryanne Berry
- Chaplain: Fr. Tom Walsh
- Grades: 9–12
- Gender: coed
- Enrollment: 275
- Average class size: 20
- Student to teacher ratio: 12:1
- Campus type: urban
- Colors: Blue and Gold
- Slogan: Preparing Chicago's youth to lead lives of leadership and service since 1910.
- Sports: Girls' and Boys' Volleyball, Girls' and Boys' Basketball, Girls' and Boys' Soccer, Track & Field, Cross Country, Flag Football, Baseball, Softball, Crew
- Mascot: Tiger
- Nickname: HT
- Team name: Tigers
- Accreditation: AdvancED Program of the State of Illinois
- Newspaper: The Gold and Blue
- Tuition: $11,300
- Affiliation: Brothers of Holy Cross
- Website: www.holytrinity-hs.org

Holy Trinity High School is a Catholic secondary school founded in Chicago, Illinois, United States, by the Congregation of Holy Cross in 1910. It is located in the Roman Catholic Archdiocese of Chicago.

Established in 1910 by the Brothers of Holy Cross, Holy Trinity was originally a boys' school serving the neighborhood sons of Polish immigrants. Today, Holy Trinity is co-educational and serves Hispanic, African American, White, and Asian students. Holy Trinity is centrally located to the Chicago area and attracts students from more than 50 ZIP codes across the city as well as around the world, through its international program.

== Academics ==
Holy Trinity offers a rigorous, college preparatory curriculum. From the B-STEM Honors program to a growing list of AP and college dual credit courses, the school provide a curriculum that prepares students for college-level courses. In fall 2018, Holy Trinity introduced a one-to-one technology plan that equips students with Chromebook touch-screen laptops. The school also has a Resource Learning Center and tutoring program that helps develop strong study habits, effective time management, and problem-solving skills.

The school partners with a number of colleges and universities to provide academic resources to the school community, including:

Benedictine University: Dual-Credit Program ·Northwestern University: Design Thinking Workshops & GoKidney Sci-High Summer Program ·Loyola University: Professional development ·University of Notre Dame: Introduction to Engineering Program, Alliance for Catholic Education ·Smith College: Summer Science and Engineering Program ·Illinois Institute of Technology: NxtGen High School Summer Program ·Malcolm X College: Pre-College Health Science Scholars Summer Program (PCHSS)

== Extracurricular activities ==
The school has over 30 clubs students can join, including Student Government, Pet Club, the Black Student Union, Poetry Club, and the Robotics Team.
