= Diocese of Les Gonaïves =

Roman Catholic diocese in Haiti

Coordinates: 19.4458°N 72.6918°W

Diocese of Les Gonaïves Dioecesis Gonayvesensis Cathédrale Saint-Charles-Borromée

Location
- Country: Haiti
- Ecclesiastical province: Province of Cap-Haïtien
- Metropolitan: Gonaïves

Statistics
- Area: 4,831 km^{2} (1,865 sq mi)
- Population: Total; Catholics: (as of 2003); 1,386,363; 791,558 (57.1%)
- Parishes: 29

Information
- Denomination: Roman Catholic
- Rite: Latin Rite
- Established: 3 October 1861 (163 years ago)
- Cathedral: Cathedral of St. Charles Borromeo

Current leadership
- Pope: Leo XIV
- Bishop: Yves-Marie Péan, C.S.C.

The Roman Catholic Diocese of Les Gonaïves (French: Diocèse catholique romain des Gonaïves; Latin: Romano-Catholicae Dioecesis Les Gonaïves), erected 3 October 1861, is a suffragan of the Archdiocese of Cap-Haïtien.

== Bishops ==
=== Ordinaries ===
- Joseph-François-Marie Julliot (1928–1936)
- Paul-Sanson-Jean-Marie Robert (1936–1966)
- Emmanuel Constant (1966–2003)
- Yves-Marie Péan, C.S.C. (2003- )

=== Coadjutor bishop ===
- Yves-Marie Péan, C.S.C. (2002-2003)

== Territorial losses ==
Year	Along with	To form
1972	Diocese of Cap-Haïtien	Diocese of Hinche

== External links and references ==
- "Diocese of Les Gonaïves". Catholic-Hierarchy.
- GCatholic.org page for this diocese
