= George Joseph Finnigan =

American clergyman (1885–1932)

His Excellency, The Most Reverend George Joseph Finnigan C.S.C.
- Bishop of Helena
- Province: Province of Portland
- Diocese: Diocese of Helena
- Installed: August 18, 1927
- Term ended: August 14, 1932
- Predecessor: John Patrick Carroll
- Successor: Ralph Leo Hayes

Orders
- Ordination: June 13, 1915 by Basilio Pompilj
- Consecration: August 1, 1927 by Peter Joseph Hurth

Personal details
- Born: February 22, 1885 Potsdam, New York, US
- Died: August 14, 1932 (aged 47) Helena, Montana, US
- Buried: Notre Dame, Indiana, US
- Denomination: Roman Catholic Church
- Education: University of Notre Dame; Pontifical Gregorian University; Laval University

Styles of George Joseph Finnigan
- Reference style: The Most Reverend
- Spoken style: Your Excellency
- Religious style: Bishop
- Posthumous style: not applicable

George Joseph Finnigan, C.S.C. (February 22, 1885 – August 14, 1932) was an American prelate of the Roman Catholic Church. He served as bishop of the Diocese of Helena in Montana from 1927 to 1932. He was a member of the Congregation of the Holy Cross (CSC)

== Biography ==
=== Early life ===
George Finnigan was born in Potsdam, New York, on February 22, 1888. He professed religious vows in the Congregation of Holy Cross

Finnigan earned a bachelor's degree from the University of Notre Dame in Indiana in 1910, before being sent to study at Holy Cross Seminary. In Rome, he earned a Licentiate of Sacred Theology at the Pontifical Gregorian University. Later, he earned a Doctor of Sacred Theology at Laval University in Montreal, Quebec.

=== Priesthood ===
Finnigan was ordained a priest for the Congregation by Cardinal Basilio Pompilj in Rome on June 13, 1915. After his ordination, the Congregation assigned Finnigan to teach at Notre Dame. During World War I, Finnigan served first as chaplain of the 137th Field Artillery Regiment of the US Army, stationed at Camp Shelby in Hattiesburg, Mississippi. Deployed in France with the American Expeditionary Force, Finnigan was assigned as a chaplain with the US Army 80th Field Artillery, earning the rank of captain.

=== Vice President of University of Notre Dame ===
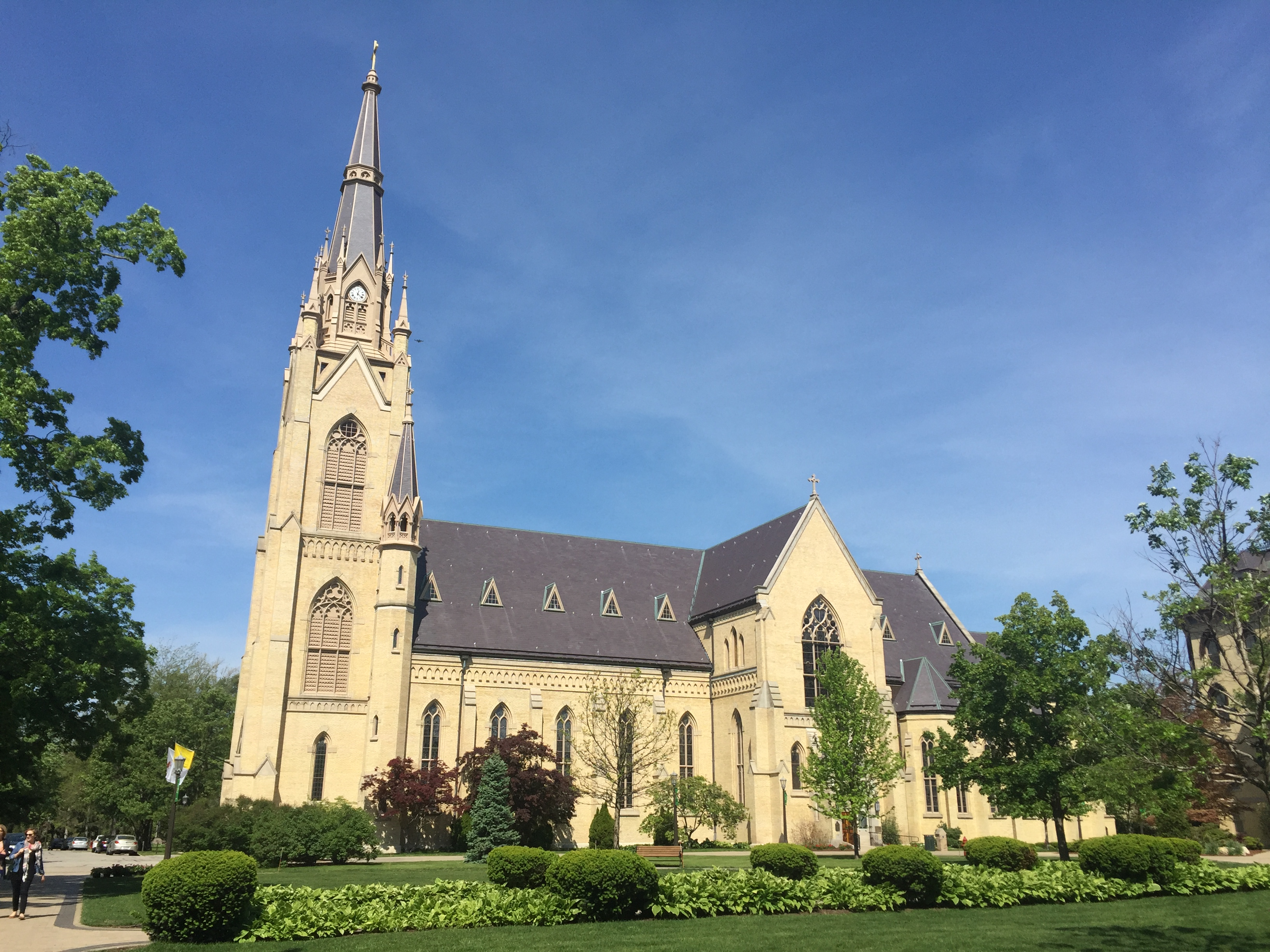
Basilica of the Sacred Heart, University of Notre Dame (2017)

In 1925, Finnigan was appointed vice president of Notre Dame. Finnigan's tenure as vice president coincided with the ascent of Notre Dame football. To counter accusations of academic laxness among athletes, he created the university's Athletic Board of Control and issued the first rules governing academic and personal standards for amateur athletes.

Finnigan was elected Provincial of the U.S. Province of the Congregation of Holy Cross in 1926 for a six-year term, but it was cut short when the pope appointed Finnigan to be bishop of Helena in 1927.

=== Bishop of Helena ===
Pope Pius XI named Finnigan on May 20, 1927, as the third bishop of Helena. He was consecrated a bishop on August 1, 1927, at the Basilica of the Sacred Heart at Notre Dame by Archbishop Peter Hurth. The co-consecrators were Bishops John F. Noll and Edward Hoban,.

While several members of the Congregation of Holy Cross had been named to the episcopacy, Finnigan was the first to do so as a bishop in the United States. During his five years as bishop, he worked

"to win the understanding and the cooperation of the clergy and of the people; to establish means of encouraging and financing native vocations to the priesthood; and to improve the condition of the Native Americans entrusted to his care. These were the guidelines this quiet, unassuming prelate followed."

The members of Blackfoot Confederacy adopted Finnigan into the tribe in Browning, Montana, on April 22, 1928. Mountain Chief gave Finnigan the name "Na-toa-ye-owa-shin" ("Holy Word") . He raised money to upgrade their churches, schools and infrastructure. His ministry also, of necessity, responded to the impact of the Wall Street crash of 1929. The financial collapse, combined with a severe drought in Montana, obliged the diocese to increase its care for the poor.

Finnigan worked hard to gain accreditation and long-term financial support for Mount St. Charles College. At commencement in 1932, Finnigan announced its renaming as Carroll College in honor of its founder, Bishop John Patrick Carroll.

=== Death and legacy ===
George Finnigan died on August 14, 1932, in Helen, at age 47.

Catholic Church titles
Preceded by John Patrick Carroll	Bishop of Helena; 1927–1932	Succeeded by Ralph Leo Hayes
