= Notre Dame College, Mymensingh =

Catholic college in Mymensingh, Bangladesh

Coordinates: 24°43′01″N 90°24′28″E

Notre Dame College Mymensigh (NDCM)
- নটর ডেম কলেজ ময়মনসিংহ
- Notre Dame College Mymensingh seal
- Motto: Diligite Lumen Sapientiae
- Motto in English: Love the Light of Wisdom
- Type: Catholic Higher Secondary School
- Established: 2014; 12 years ago
- Affiliations: Board of Intermediate and Secondary Education, Mymensingh (EIIN: 137031)
- Principal: Dr. Fr. Thadeus Hembrom CSC
- Students: 2,250
- Location: Barera, City Bypass, Mymensingh, Bangladesh
- Campus: 4 acres (1.6 ha); Sub-Urban
- Colors: Cream; Black
- Nickname: NDCM
- Website: ndcm.edu.bd

Notre Dame College Mymensingh (Bengali: নটর ডেম কলেজ ময়মনসিংহ; abbreviated as NDCM), is a Catholic higher secondary school in Mymensingh, Bangladesh. It was founded on 1 July 2014, and is named after Mother Mary.

== History ==
Notre Dame College Mymensingh was established by the Roman Catholic Priests from the Congregation of Holy Cross in Mymensingh in 2014. The construction work started on March 1, 2013; after the cornerstone was laid. Classes for the eleventh grade started shortly on July 1, 2014. It was officially inaugurated on January 11, 2015.

== Hall & Residence ==
Within the Notre Dame College Mymensingh campus, there is the Queen Livan House, which accommodates the Reverend Fathers, and the Holy Cross Building, which provides accommodation for Christian students only.

== Transportation ==
Notre Dame College buses are available in Mymensingh city to facilitate the transportation of the students of the institution, but currently bus facilities are closed.

== Gallery ==
Notre Dame College
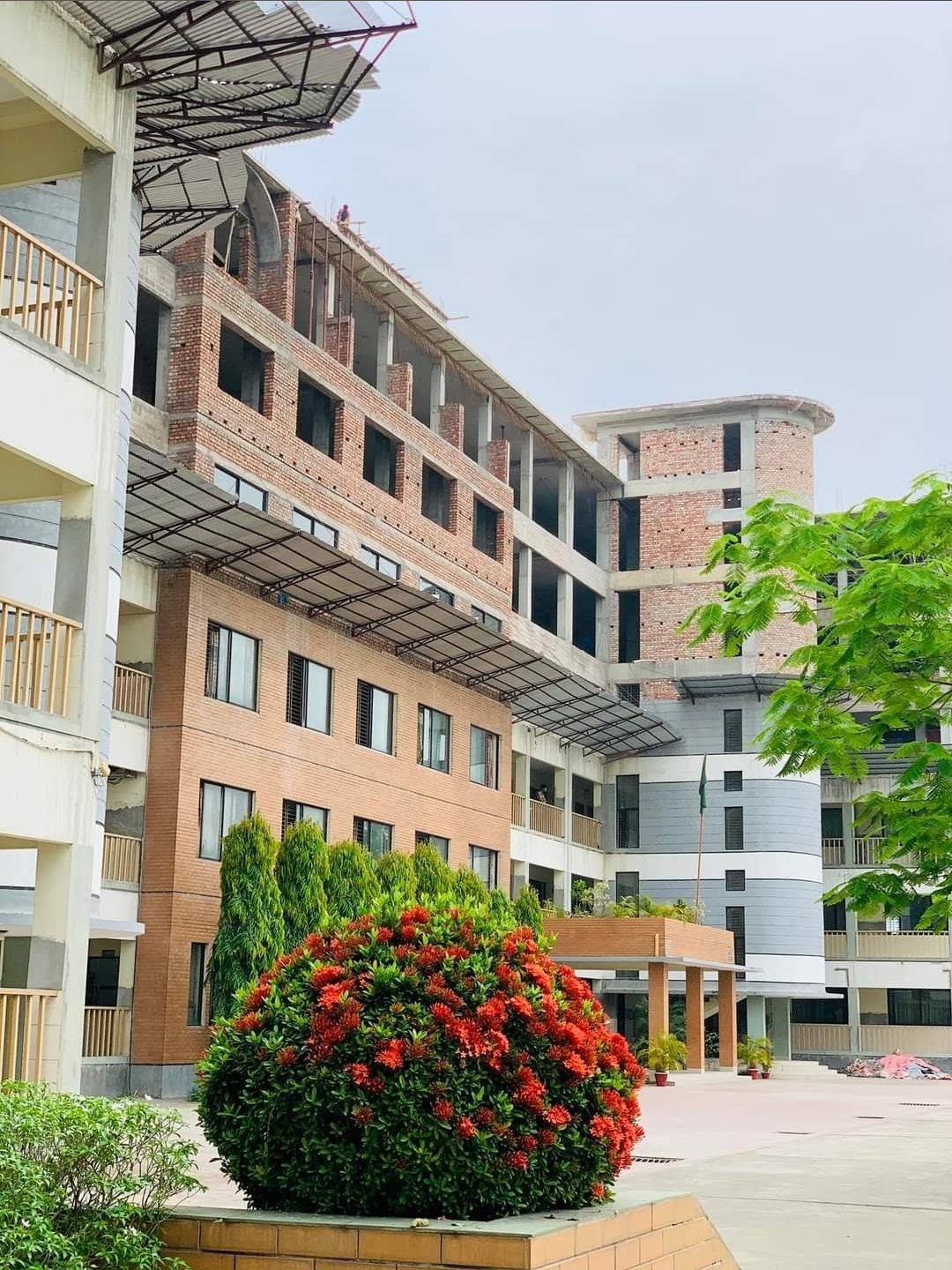
College building under construction

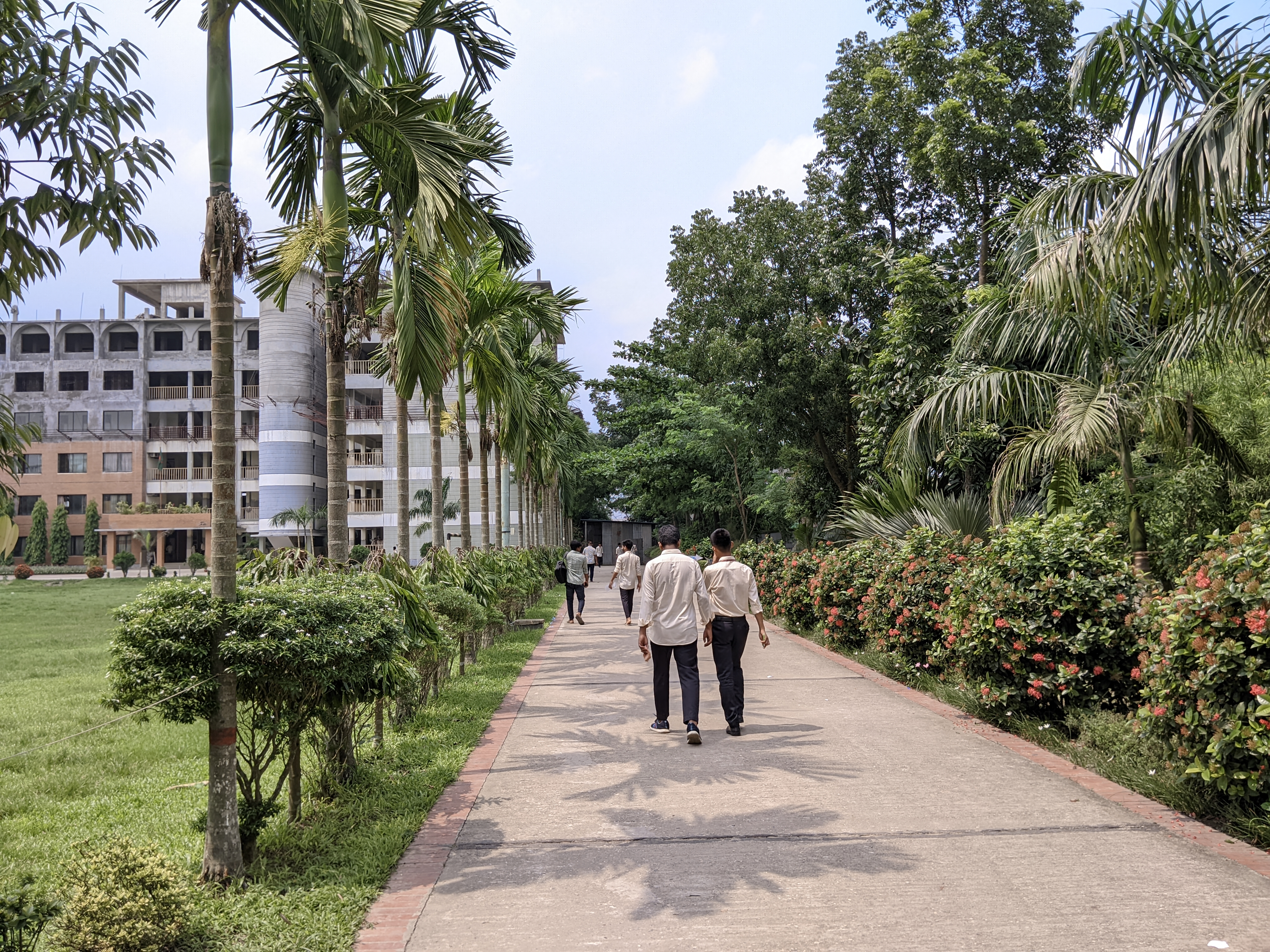
NDCM On-campus Main Road

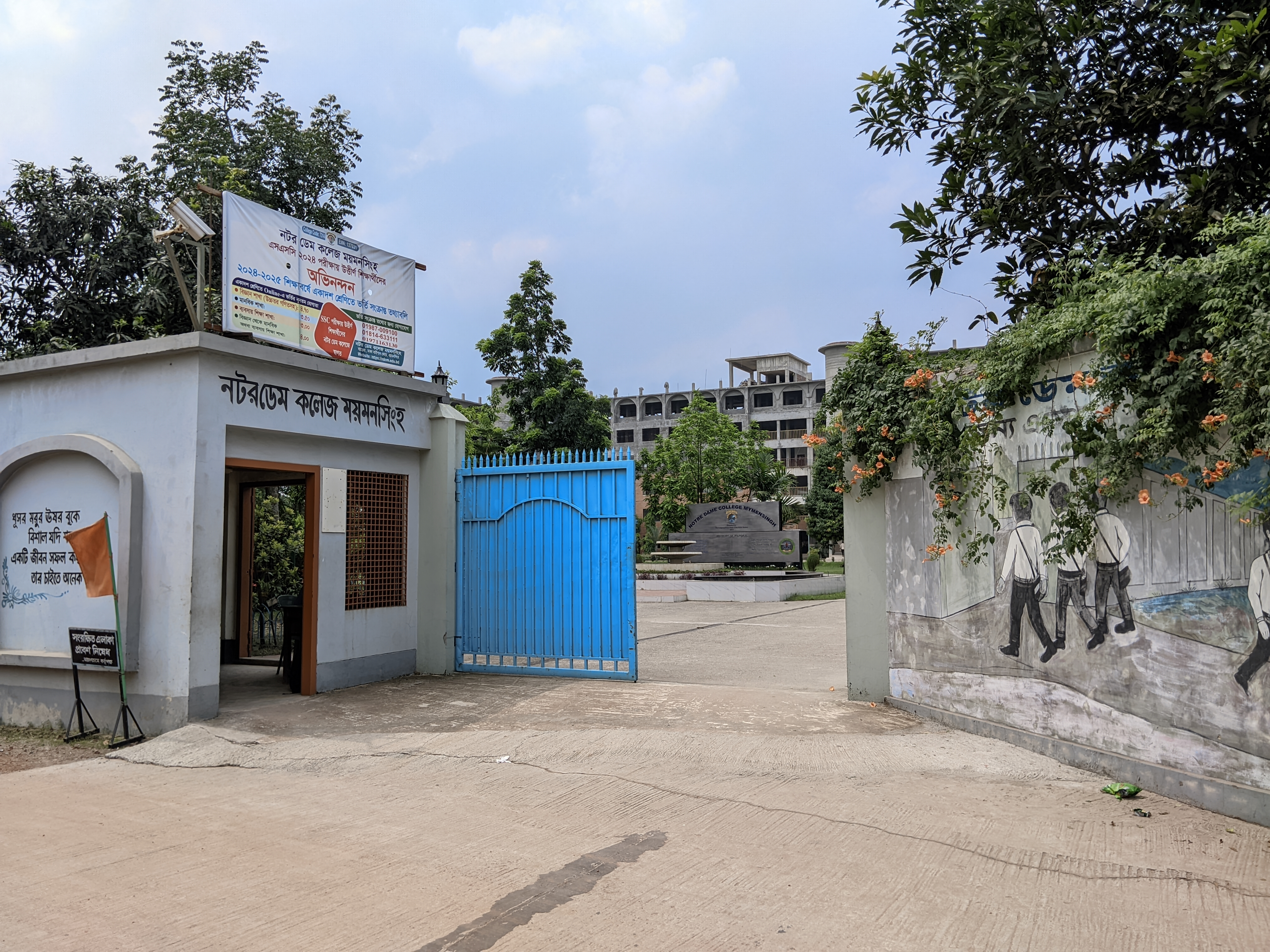
Entrance of Notre Dame College Mymensingh

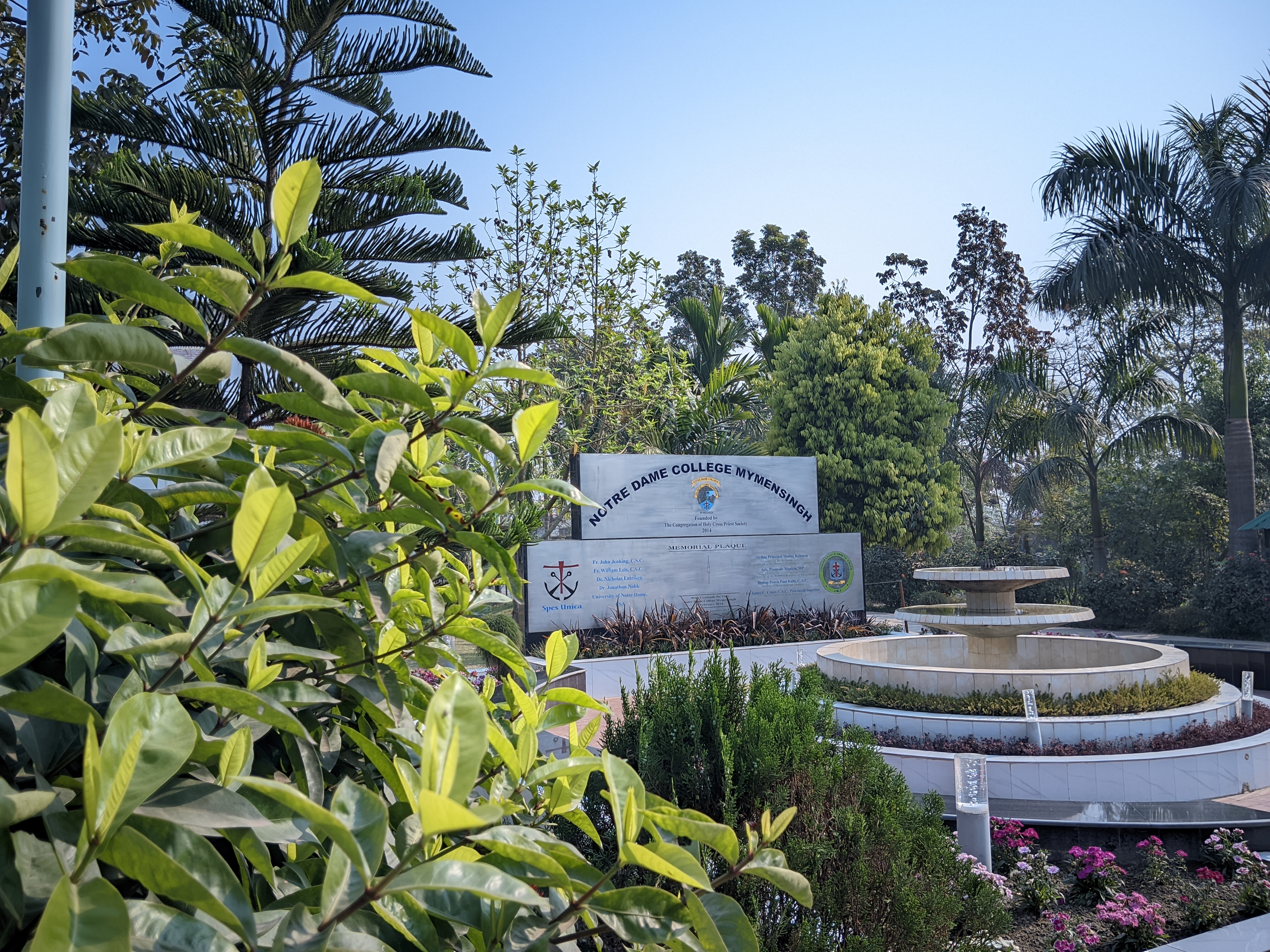
Memorial Plaque of Notre Dame College Mymensingh

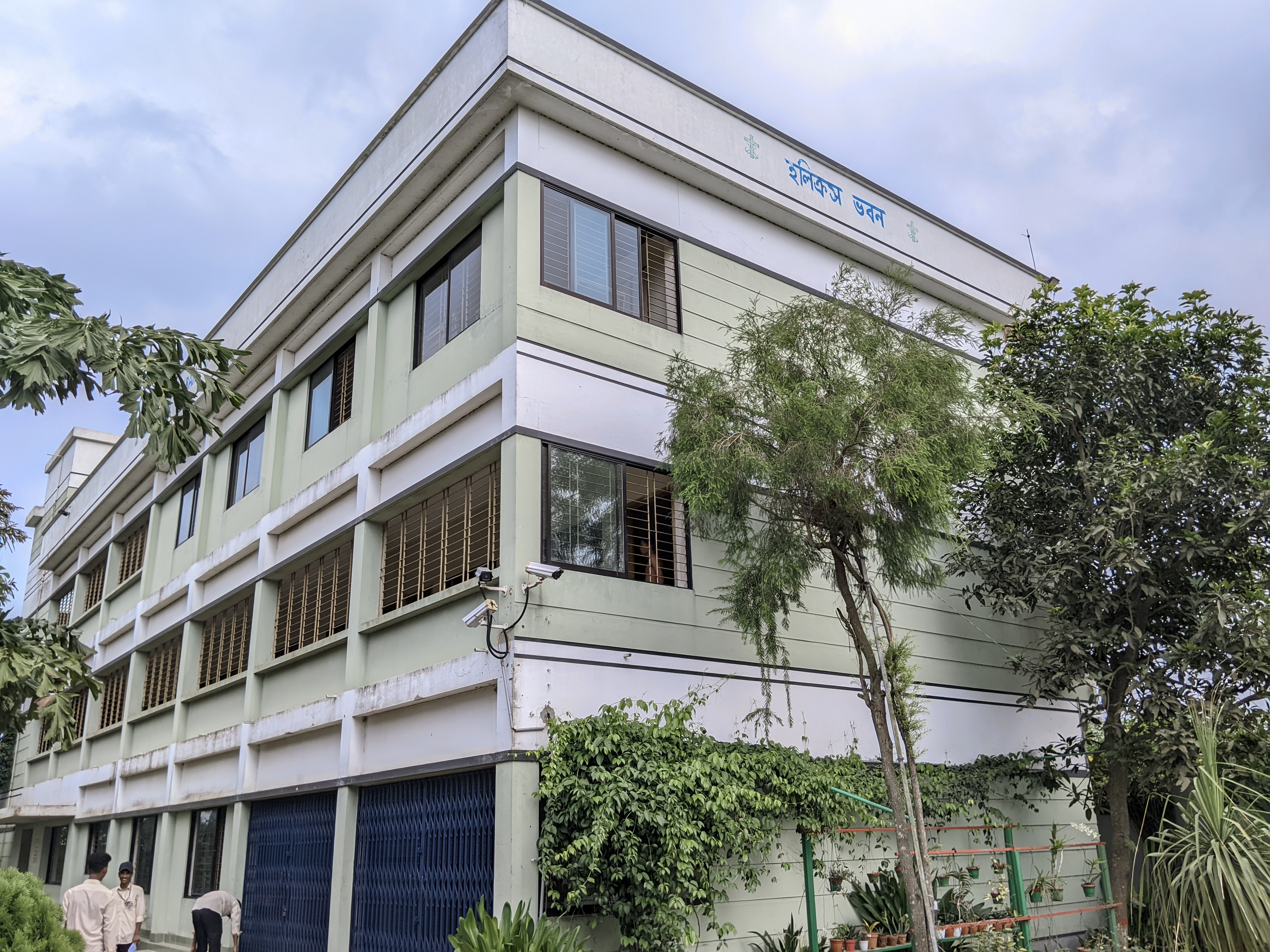
Holy Cross Building, Notre Dame College Mymensingh

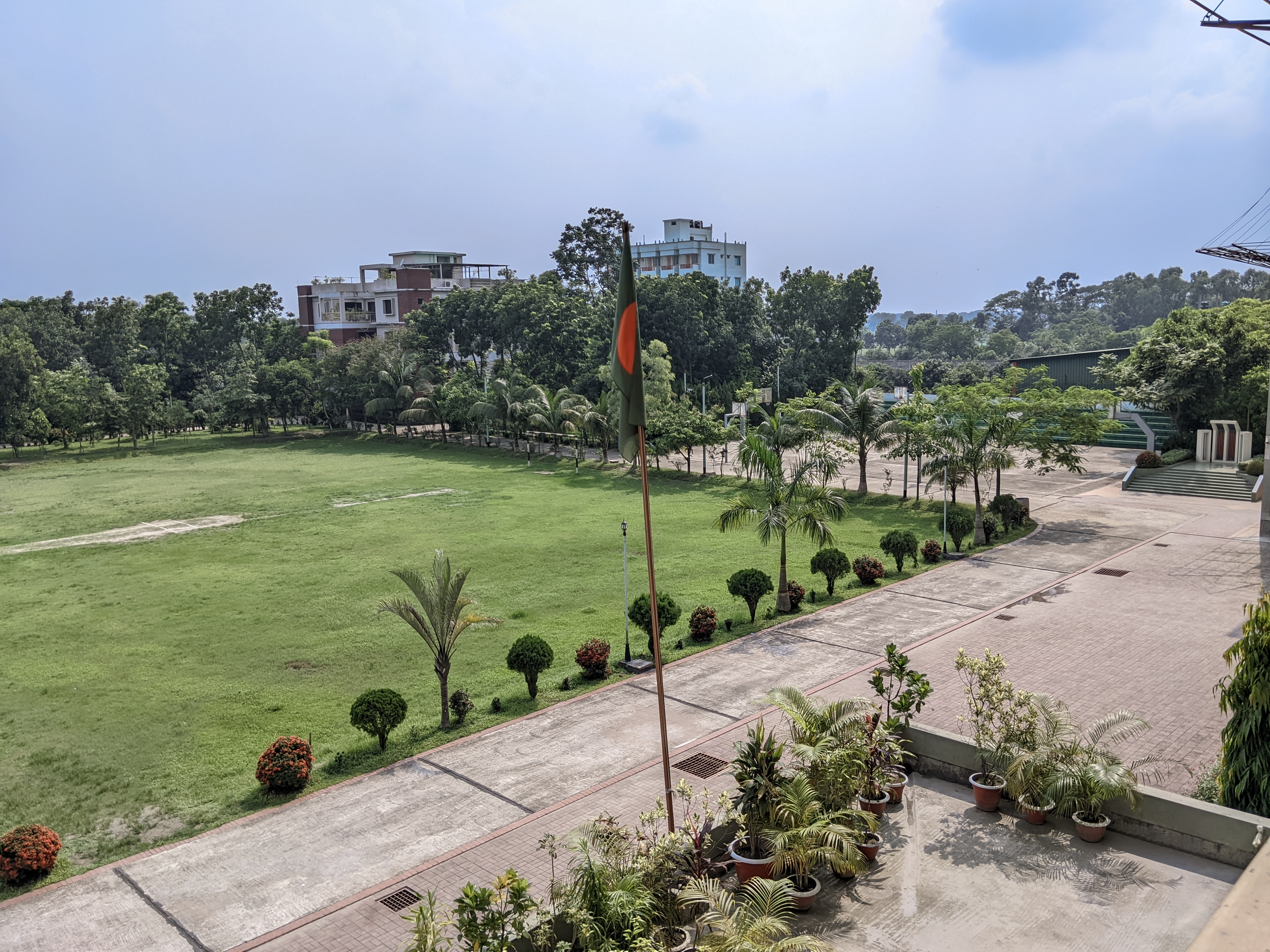
View of the Playground from the Academic Building, Notre Dame College Mymensingh

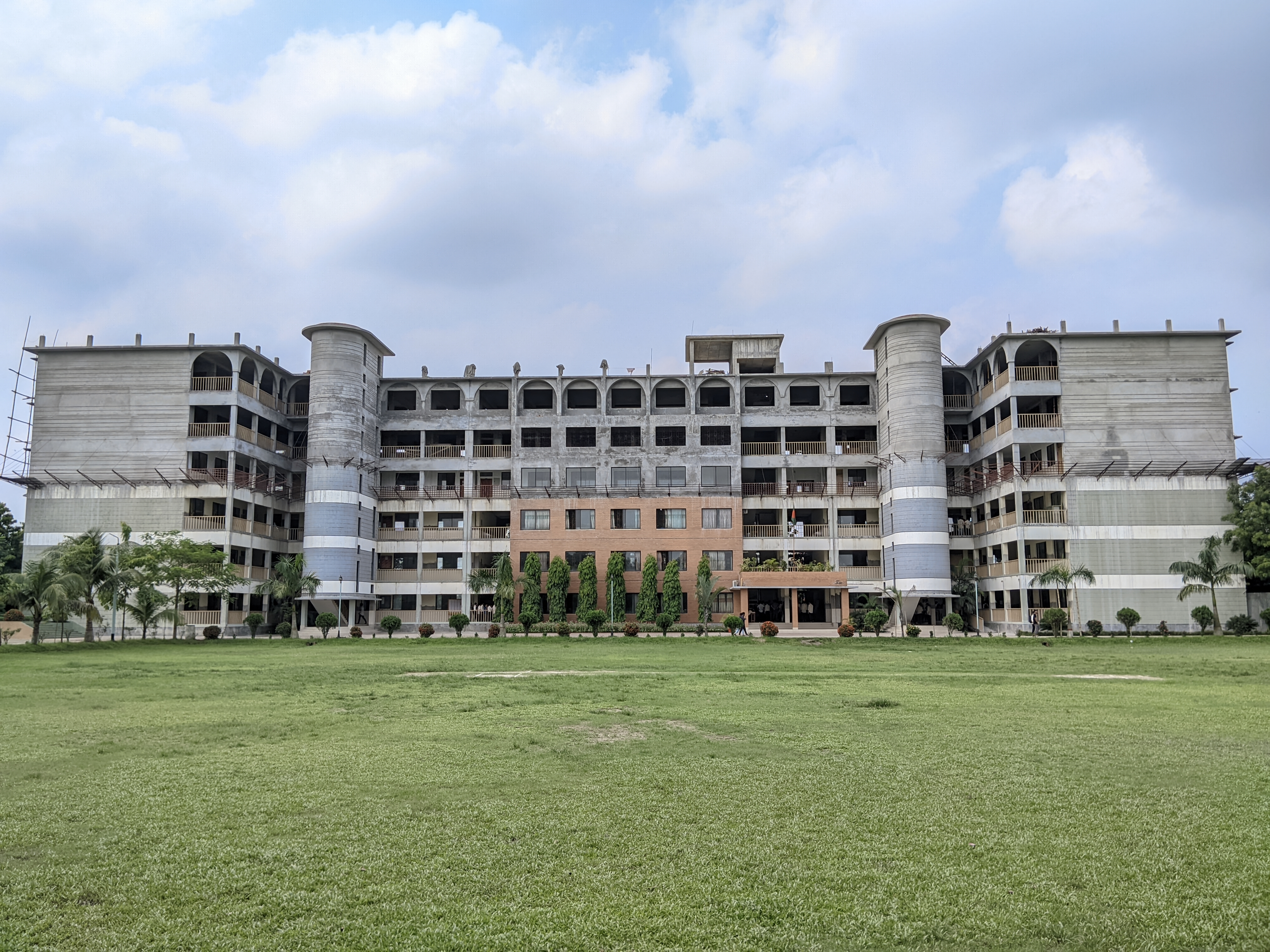
Expansion of the Academic Building, Notre Dame College Mymensingh

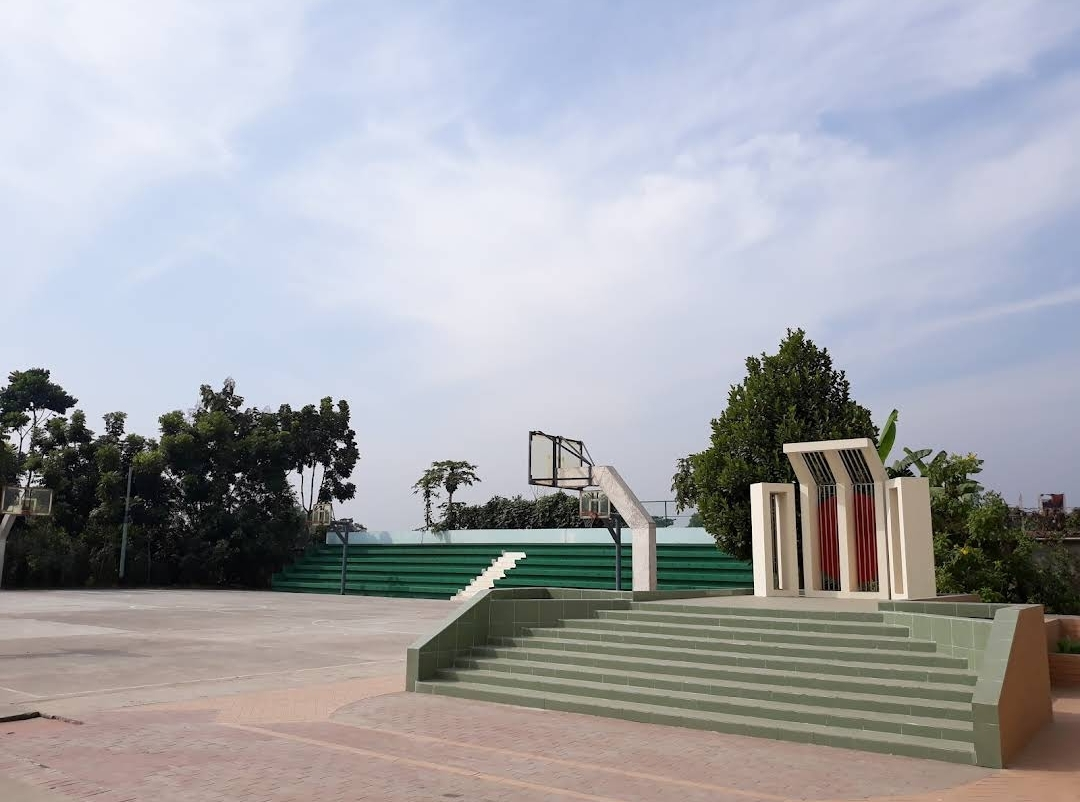
Basketball Court and Shaheed Minar, Notre Dame College Mymensingh
