= Emmanuel Constant (bishop) =

Bishop Emmanuel Constant (January 5, 1928 – June 16, 2009). Born in Port-au-Prince he was ordained priest on July 12, 1953. Pope Paul VI appointed him Bishop of Les Gonaïves.He was consecrated by Bishop Antonio Samoré as part of the indigenisation of the Haitian clergy. He served as bishop 37 years and retired on July 30, 2003, after reaching the age limit. Bishop Constant died on June 16, 2009, in Port-au-Prince of cancer.
