= Congregation of Holy Cross =

Catholic religious congregation of missionary priests and brothers

- Latin: Congregatio a Sancta Cruce
- Abbreviation: CSC
- Formation: 1 March 1837 (189 years ago)
- Founder: Blessed Basile-Antoine Marie Moreau, C.S.C.
- Founded at: Le Mans, France
- Type: Clerical religious congregation of pontifical right for men
- Headquarters: Via Framura 85, Rome, Italy
- Members: 1,399 members (includes 729 priests) as of 2020
- Motto: Latin: Ave Crux Spes Unica; English: Hail the Cross, Our Only Hope
- Superior General: Br. Paul Bednarczyk, CSC
- Parent organization: Catholic Church
- Website: holycrosscongregation.org

The Congregation of Holy Cross (Latin: Congregatio a Sancta Cruce), abbreviated CSC, is a Catholic clerical religious congregation of pontifical right for men founded in Le Mans, France, in 1837 by Basil Moreau.

Moreau also founded the Marianites of Holy Cross for women, now divided into three independent congregations of sisters: the Marianites of Holy Cross (Le Mans, France), the Sisters of the Holy Cross (Notre Dame, Indiana), and the Sisters of Holy Cross (Montreal, Quebec, Canada).

== History ==
=== Two Societies ===
Basile Antoine-Marie Moreau was born at Laigné-en-Belin, near Le Mans, France, on February 11, 1799, in the final months of the French Revolution. When Moreau decided to enter the priesthood, he was forced to undergo his seminary training in secret for fear that the French government would arrest him. He completed his studies and was ordained for the Diocese of Le Mans in 1821. The French government continued to work for the removal of the Church from the educational system, which left many Catholics without a place to be educated or catechized. In 1835, Moreau had formed a group, which he called "Auxiliary Priests", to serve the educational and evangelization needs of the Diocese of Le Mans.

On July 15, 1820, a priest of the Diocese of Le Mans, Jacques-Francois Dujarié, brought together a group of zealous men to serve the educational needs of the people in the French countryside. Fr. Dujarié named this group the Brothers of St. Joseph. By 1835 this group was well established in the diocese, but Dujarié was getting older and they were in need of a new leader. Dujarié and Moreau had met previously and discussed their views on the future of the Church in France and so Dujarié knew that Moreau was just the man he was looking for. With the consent of the bishop, Moreau was given control of the Brothers of St. Joseph on August 31, 1835. He was now the head of two organizations, the Auxiliary Priests and the Brothers of St. Joseph.

=== The Association of Holy Cross ===
In 1837, Moreau made the decision to combine his two communities into one society so that the priests and brothers could share resources and ministries in common. On March 1, 1837, the priests and brothers gathered in the church of Notre-Dame de Sainte-Croix, Le Mans, in the Sainte-Croix district of Le Mans to sign the Fundamental Act of Union which legally joined them into one association. This new group took on the name of where they met and became the Association of Holy Cross. Initially Holy Cross was a diocesan group and so they primarily served in whatever capacity the bishop asked of them. In 1840 this changed when Moreau received a request to send a delegation from his society to Algeria with the purpose of establishing schools and a seminary. It was at this point that Moreau shifted the focus of Holy Cross and after the first missionaries left in April 1840 the association took on the identity of a religious institute. On August 15, 1840, Moreau and four others became the first professed religious in the Association of Holy Cross. As part of his plan to form this religious institute, Moreau also brought together the first group of women who would become the Marianites of Holy Cross.

In 1841, he sent a group to the United States, establishing the first Holy Cross institution in North America at Notre Dame in Indiana. The institute expanded further by establishing missions in Canada in 1847 and in East Bengal in 1852.

This association of priests, brothers, and sisters, would continue in roughly the same form until May 13, 1857, when Pope Pius IX approved the first constitutions of the priests and brothers. From that point on the Association officially became the Congregation of Holy Cross. Doubting the propriety of a mixed congregation of men and women, Rome separated the women into an independent community at that time. Moreau, in his role as their founder, continued to work for Rome's approval of the sisters' constitution. In 1865, Rome approved the constitutions of the Marianites of Holy Cross, granting them the status of an Apostolic congregation.

== Holy Cross and The Holy Family ==
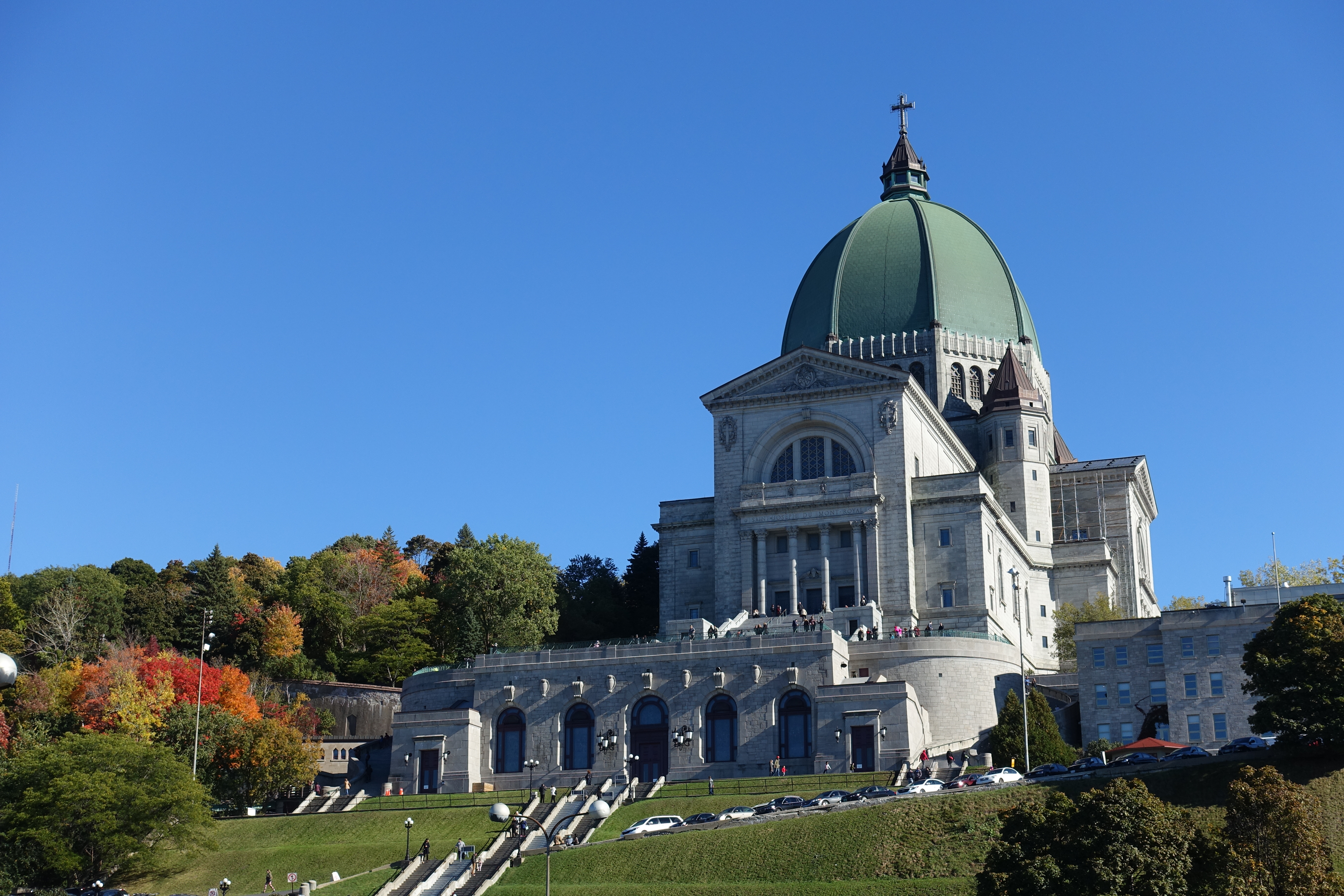
St. Joseph's Oratory in Montreal, Quebec, Canada.

Moreau saw a visible image of the Holy Family in this Congregation of Holy Cross which he had conceived as an association of religious men and women working together on equal footing for the building of the reign of God. He intended that this Congregation, composed at its origins of three distinct Societies, namely, Sisters, Priests, and Brothers, be an apostolic institute. Calling on the spiritual aid of Jesus, Mary, and Joseph, Moreau gave to each of the three groups a patron: he consecrated the priests to the Sacred Heart of Jesus; he consecrated the brothers to the pure heart of St. Joseph; and he consecrated the sisters to the Immaculate Heart of Mary. He also established Mary, under her title of Our Lady of Sorrows, as special patroness for all of Holy Cross, whose members in their several congregations continue to cherish these devotions. As Moreau stated in one of his letters, he envisioned that: "Holy Cross will grow like a mighty tree and constantly shoot forth new limbs and new branches which will be nourished by the same sap and endowed with the same life."

== Superiors General ==
1. Fr. Basil Moreau, CSC (1837–1866)
2. Most Rev. Pierre Dufal, CSC (1866–1868)
3. Fr. Edward Sorin, CSC (1868–1893)
4. Fr. Gilbert Francais, CSC (1893–1926?)
5. Fr. James Wesley Donahue, CSC (1926–1938)
6. Fr. Albert Cousineau, CSC (1938–1950)
7. Fr. Christopher O'Toole, CSC (1950–1962)
8. Fr. Germain-Marie Lalande, CSC (1962–1974)
9. Fr. Tom Barrosse, CSC (1974–1986)
10. Fr. Claude Grou, CSC (1986–1998)
11. Fr. Hugh Cleary, CSC (1998–2010)
12. Fr. Richard Warner, CSC (2010–2016)
13. Fr. Robert Epping, CSC (2016–2022)
14. Br. Paul Bednarczyk, CSC (2022–present)

== Provinces, Districts, and Vicariates ==
- United States Province of Priests and Brothers (USA)
  - District of Chile-Peru
- Midwest Province of Brothers (USA)
- Canadian Province of Priests and Brothers (Canada)
- Moreau Province (USA)
  - District of Brazil
- Province of East Africa
- Province of West Africa
- Sacred Heart of Jesus Province (Bangladesh)
- St. Joseph Province (Bangladesh)
- Our Lady of Perpetual Help Province (Haiti)
- Province of North East India
- South India Province
- Province of Tamil Nadu (India)
- St. Andre Province (India)
- Mother Province (France)

== Notable members ==
=== Saints and Blesseds ===
- Saint André Bessette, CSC, "Miracle Man of Montreal" and the institute's first recognized Saint
- Blessed Basil Moreau, CSC, Founder of the Congregation

=== Members of the Hierarchy ===
- Archbishop Peter Joseph Hurth, CSC, Bishop of Dhaka (1894-1909), Bishop of Nueva Segovia (1913-1926) and archbishop of Bosra (1926-1935)
- Bishop Arthur "Bud" Colgan, CSC, Auxiliary Bishop of Chosica (Peru), Titular Bishop of Ampora
- Cardinal Patrick D'Rozario, CSC, former Archbishop of Dhaka, Bangladesh
- Bishop George Joseph Finnigan, CSC, Third Bishop of the Diocese of Helena in the state of Montana.
- Servant of God Archbishop Theotonius Amal Ganguly, CSC, second Archbishop of Dhaka
- Bishop Daniel R. Jenky, CSC, Bishop of Peoria, IL
- Bishop Jorge Izaguirre Rafael, CSC, Prelate of Chuquibamba, Peru
- Servant of God Bishop Vincent J. McCauley, CSC, First Bishop of Fort Portal, Uganda
- Archbishop Marcos G. McGrath, CSC, former Archbishop of Panamá (1969–1994)
- Bishop Lumen Monteiro, CSC, First Bishop of Agartala
- John Francis Cardinal O'Hara, CSC, President of Notre Dame (1934–1939) and Archbishop of Philadelphia (1951–1960)
- Bishop Yves-Marie Péan, CSC., Bishop of Les Gonaïves, Haiti.
- Bishop Stephen Rotluanga, CSC, Bishop of Aizawl
- Archbishop Charles Asa Schleck, CSC, Titular Archbishop of Africa
- Bishop William Albert Wack, CSC, Bishop of Diocese of Pensacola–Tallahassee
- Bishop Paul E. Waldschmidt, CSC, President of the University of Portland (1962–1978) and Auxiliary Bishop of Portland (1978–1994)
- Bishop Patrick Neary, CSC, Bishop of Roman Catholic Diocese of Saint Cloud
- Archbishop James Hector MacDonald, CSC, Auxiliary Bishop of Hamilton, Ontario (1978-1982), Bishop of Charlottetown, Prince Edward Island (1982-1991), Archbishop of St. John's, Newfoundland (1991-2000)

=== Others ===
- Fr. Gerald Fitzgerald, s.P., founder of The Congregation of the Servants of the Paraclete
- Fr. Theodore "Ted" Hesburgh, CSC, President of Notre Dame (1952–1987) and Chair of the United States Civil Rights Commission (1969–1972)
- Servant of God Br. Flavian Laplante, CSC, missionary
- Fr. Julius Nieuwland, CSC, professor and inventor
- Venerable Fr. Patrick Peyton, CSC, "The Rosary Priest"
- Fr. John Zahm, CSC, scientist and explorer
- Fr. Richard William Timm, CSC, missionary, educator, zoologist, and development worker

== Location ==
Holy Cross priests and brothers can be found across the globe, including these countries (date of first appearance in parentheses):

- France (1820)
- United States (1841)
- Chile (1943)
- Haiti (1944)
- Canada (1847)
- Italy (1850)
- Bangladesh (1853)
- India (1853)
- Ghana (1957)
- Brazil (1958)
- Uganda (1958)
- Peru (1961)
- Kenya (195–)
- Liberia (1950s?)
- Tanzania (2003)

== Foreign Missions ==
=== The Mission of Holy Cross in Bangladesh ===
The first group of Holy Cross missionaries to reach India left England January 17, 1853. It was composed of three brothers, three sisters, one priest and one seminarian. (Two priests dropped out due to severe illness when the first attempt to sail in November 1852 failed due to storms.) The group arrived in Calcutta in May 1853. Fr. Verite took the sisters to Dhaka, while the brothers and seminarian went to Noakhali. Fr. Verite soon joined them as pastor of Noakhali, which included Agartala and Sylhet in its territory. Chittagong became the headquarters of Holy Cross in December 1853.

The East Bengal mission was called at the time, "unquestionably the most destitute in East Asia and perhaps in any other part of the world." Because it was such a difficult and dangerous place to live and work, no other religious congregation showed any interest in it. For many years, priests had to face difficult situations. For example, in 1897, the Bishop of Dhaka, Bishop Peter Joseph Hurth, saw his diocese destroyed by an earthquake and a typhoon.Though the mission was named East Bengal, the Church jurisdiction and the political territory or civil jurisdiction called East Bengal were quite different from each other. The Province of East Bengal was first created in 1905. The Church territory was officially called the Vicariate of East Bengal, set up in 1845 by the Sacred Congregation for the Propagation of the Faith at the Vatican. Its first superior was Bishop Thomas Olliffe, an Irish Jesuit. The Vicariate of East Bengal embraced the present-day Archdiocese of Dhaka, Diocese of Mymensingh, and Diocese of Chittagong, as well as a large part of Assam, the Arakan district (former name of the Rakhine State of western Burma, and the Diocese of Agartala in eastern India. It was a huge area, but when Holy Cross arrived in 1853, there were only three priests working there - a Portuguese Augustinian and two young Irish diocesan priests, both of whom were dead of disease by 1854. There were about 13,000 Catholics in the area. In Dhaka, there was no church or chapel at all under the jurisdiction of Rome.

=== The Mission of Holy Cross in Chile ===
The District of Chile is the longest-running mission still overseen by the United States Province. Three Holy Cross religious arrived in Santiago, Chile, on March 1, 1943, at the invitation of Cardinal José María Caro, Archbishop of Santiago (Chile), to administer Saint George's College. Fathers William Havey, Alfred Send, and Joseph Dougherty believed they were going to do university work. Little did they know that "college" in this context meant a school of first through 12th graders.

Today, Saint George's College serves 2,650 students. Its history is rich and is closely tied with the history of Chile, including the 1970s when the school was taken over by the military government and Holy Cross was ousted. The Congregation returned to the school in 1986. Strong faith formation and service have been a hallmark of Saint George's. Over the decades, the college has formed many influential leaders in Chilean society. Also Holy Cross' first Chilean vocation, Fr. Jorge Canepa, was a 1946 graduate of the school.

Additionally, the District administers Colegio Nuestra Señora de Andacollo, located in the older sector of Central Santiago. The Congregation took responsibility for the school in the 1970s, after its expulsion from Saint George's. The student body, numbering 1,100, is made up primarily of children from working-class families. With improvements to the physical plant and the strong Holy Cross commitment, the school has been able to reach new heights academically.

From the beginning, the mission of Holy Cross in Chile also included parish ministry and social service. Within three years of arriving, the Congregation had begun both its ministry at San Roque, a parish in the sector of Penalolen in Santiago, as well as its outreach to abandoned children in Santiago and later in Talagante. Today, the District administers two parishes in addition to San Roque: Nuestra Señora de Andacollo, in the same area as the school; and Nuestra Señora de la Merced, in Calle Larga, in the Diocese of San Felipe. The parishes are known for their youth ministry and social justice work. Then through Fundamor and Fundación Moreau, the District continues its work with abandoned children. Currently there are approximately 50 children in residence, ages 4 to 18. There is also a new prevention program ministering to 100 children that has been recognized as the first of its kind in Chile.

=== The Mission of Holy Cross in Mexico ===
Initially the members of the Congregation of Holy Cross were sent to Mexico from Texas. In 1972, Fr. Frederick Schmidt, CSC, was sent to Mexico for a "sabbatical" by Fr. Christopher O'Toole, CSC, the Provincial of the Southern Province at the time. In 1973 Fr. Fred assumed the pastoral responsibility for a large parish in Ahuacatlan, San Luis Potosí, Nuestro Padre Jesús. He served as pastor for 25 years. In 1998 when Fr. Francisco Garcia, a priest from the Diocese of Ciudad Valles, was appointed pastor, Fr. Fred became the pastor emeritus. When Fr. Schmidt died in 2003, he was buried at the parish in the crypt of the convent church that he helped build. With his death, Holy Cross withdrew from this parish, although one of its members has become a Holy Cross priest. The relationship with the parish and pastor continues to be one of friendship and Holy Cross offers occasional assistance.

In 1987, the Southern Province assumed the responsibility for the pastoral care of Santo Tomas Moro parish in the Archdiocese of Monterrey, Nuevo León. The parish grew dramatically and eventually gave birth to a new parish, Nuestra Madre Santisima de La Luz. Holy Cross opted to shift from Santo Tomas Moro to this new parish with greater needs. Holy Cross continues to serve this community.

In 1993 the Southern Province founded a program of vocation promotion and initial formation for young Mexican men who believe they are called to religious life and priesthood in Holy Cross. The Southern Province established a program for postulants and a program for professed seminarians. The novitiate for the formation program is in Peru.

In 1999, Holy Cross Family Ministries founded Family Rosary in México. Their offices and meeting rooms are located in an Archdiocesan pastoral center in San Francisco Javier parish, close to La Luz parish in the Archdiocese of Monterrey. Their offices serve as a "hub" for the growing Holy Cross apostolate of fostering family prayer, especially the rosary, as well as devotion to Mary throughout Mexico.

In 2000, the local Holy Cross community in Monterrey established an immersion program at La Luz parish. This program provides an intercultural experience of life and ministry with and for the poor. It is offered principally to students from Holy Cross universities, high schools, and parishes in the United States. One group of Chilean laywomen also participated. The program has been temporarily suspended due to the wave of violence in Mexico.

In 2010, Fr. Marín Hernández, CSC, and Fr. Paulino Antonio, CSC, the first two Mexicans to be ordained as Holy Cross priests, were assigned to Parroquia San José in Tamán, San Luis Potosí. The Bishop of the Diocese of Ciudad Valles offered this parish to Holy Cross in part because of the indigenous community's need for pastoral care and evangelization. Frs. Hernández and Antonio speak Nahuatl, the language of the people, and Fr. Antonio comes from this indigenous group.

In 2011 the Holy Cross community in Mexico became a part of the newly formed U.S. Province of Priests and Brothers.

=== The Mission of Holy Cross in Peru ===
The mission of Holy Cross in Peru began with an exhortation of Pope John XXIII to religious orders to send missionaries to Latin America, and Holy Cross arrived in the north of Peru in Cartavio in September 1963. The presence soon included Chimbote in the early 1960s and expanded for a time to Puno and Tacna, on the border of Bolivia and Chile, and finally came to develop an organized presence and pastoral strategy in the Diocese of Chosica. The parish, El Señor de la Esperanza, is about the size of a small diocese in the U.S. Approximately 250,000 Catholics live in a parish that has 19 chapels. In 1982, within the boundaries of Lord of Hope Parish in Canto Grande, the Congregation established "Yancana Huasy" (literally "House of Work" in the language of the Incas). Yancana Huasy attends to the needs of children who live with physical and mental challenges, including Down syndrome, and their families.

=== The Mission of Holy Cross in Uganda ===
In November 1958, four Holy Cross priests arrived in Entebbe, Uganda to begin their ministry. The dioceses of Toro and Bunyoro were too large for the bishop to handle. He granted Holy Cross permission to minister to the people of Fort Portal and Butiti. Soon thereafter Holy Cross began administrating St. Leo's College, a high school in Kyegobe, Fort Portal diocese. Near Christmas of 1960, Holy Cross began its first parish at Bukwali. Around the end of February 1961, Cardinal Agaginian, the Armenian Patriarch at the time, told Fr. Christopher O'Toole, CSC, the superior general of Holy Cross, that missionary Vincent J. McCauley was to be made Bishop of Fort Portal. In 1967, a house, and later novitiate (in 1984), was built on the shores of Lake Saaka in Fort Portal. During the military dictatorship of Idi Amin, the Congregation decided at one point to leave the Diocese of Fort Portal. This proposal was later abandoned. Bishop McCauley died on November 1, 1982.

By 1962, the institute had begun accepting Ugandan religious aspirants to the community. Along with other religious institutes, they began a seminary in Kenya called Tangaza in 1986. By 1989, Holy Cross and a consortium of religious congregations and societies established the Queen of Apostles Philosophy Centre in the Roman Catholic Diocese of Jinja ("PCJ") due largely to the political crises between Kenya and Uganda. It was then difficult for Ugandans to study at Tangaza. PCJ was to be a seminary for philosophical and religious studies for these (mostly Ugandan) postulants.

On August 17, 1991, Holy Cross ordained its first Ugandan priest, Fr. Fulgens Katende. Five Holy Cross Brother's and one priest died in the genocide of 1994. In Bugembe and Wanyange, two villages of the Jinja Diocese, a primary school and secondary were opened: Holy Cross Primary and Holy Cross Lakeview Secondary respectively. In 1998, Lakeview made world news when United States President Bill Clinton landed in a helicopter on the school's compound for discussions with Ugandan President Museveni. A third parish opened in 1994 at Kyrausozi.

In the new millennium the first [East] African district superior of Holy Cross was named in 2003. This was a step towards congregational and district maturity as the past nine superiors had been Americans.

== Holy Cross educational institutions ==
=== Higher education ===
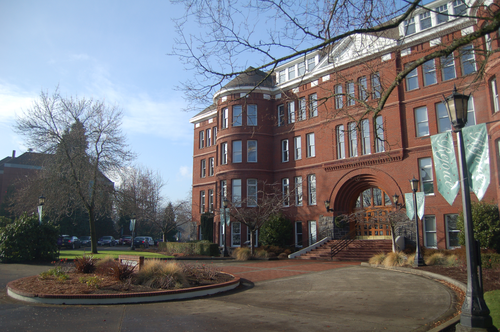
Waldschmidt Hall, formerly West Hall, at the University of Portland.

- University of Notre Dame, Notre Dame, Indiana (1842)
- Saint Mary's College, Notre Dame, Indiana (1844) (Sisters of the Holy Cross)
- St. Edward's University, Austin, Texas (1878)
- St. Joseph College, St. Joseph, New Brunswick Canada (1864)
- University of Portland, Portland, Oregon (1901)
- University of Holy Cross, New Orleans, Louisiana (1916) (Marianites of Holy Cross)
- King's College, Wilkes-Barre, Pennsylvania (1946)
- Stonehill College, Easton, Massachusetts (1948)
- Notre Dame College, Dhaka, Bangladesh (1949)
- Holy Cross College, Notre Dame, Indiana (1966) (Brothers of Holy Cross)
- Holy Cross College, Agartala, India (2009)
- Notre Dame University Bangladesh, Dhaka, Bangladesh (2013)

=== Secondary schools ===
==== Bangladesh ====
- Saint Placid's High School, Chittagong, Bangladesh (1853)
- St. Gregory's High School & College, Dhaka, Bangladesh (school 1881, college 2016)
- Holy Cross High School, Dhaka, Bangladesh (1912)
- Saint Nicholas High School, Nagori, Bangladesh (1920)
- Biroidakuni High School, Mymensingh, Bangladesh (1941)
- Brother Andre High School, Noakhali, Bangladesh (c. 1940)
- Mariam Ashram High School, Chittagong, Bangladesh (1946)
- Notre Dame College, Dhaka, Bangladesh (1949)
- Notre Dame College, Mymensingh, Bangladesh (2014)
- Holy Cross College (Dhaka), Dhaka, Bangladesh (1950) (Sisters of the Holy Cross)
- Holy Cross Girls' High School, Dhaka, Bangladesh (1950) (Sisters of the Holy Cross)
- Udayan High School, Barisal, Bangladesh (1952)
- Saint Joseph Higher Secondary School, Dhaka, Bangladesh (1954)
- St. Joseph School of Industrial Trades, Dhaka, Bangladesh (1954)

==== Brazil ====
- Colégio Santa Maria, São Paulo, Brazil (1947) (Sisters of Holy Cross)
- Colégio Dom Amando, Santarém, Brazil (1966)
- Colégio Notre Dame, Campinas, Brazil (1961)
- Colégio Santa Cruz, São Paulo, Brazil (1952)

==== Canada ====
- Collège Notre-Dame du Sacré-Coeur (Montreal), Montreal, Quebec, Canada (1869)
- Notre Dame College School (Welland), Welland, Ontario, Canada
- Holy Cross Catholic Secondary School (St. Catharines, Ontario)
- Saint Joseph's Oratory, Montreal, Quebec, Canada

==== Chile ====
- St. George's College, Santiago, Chile (1943)
- Colegio de Nuestra Senora de Andacollo, (Santiago), Santiago, Chile (1976)

==== France ====
- Saint-Michel de Picpus, Paris. France
- Saint-Michel de Saint-Mandé, Saint-Mandé. France
- Notre Dame de Garaison, Monléon-Magnoac. France
- Notre Dame d'Orveau, Nyoiseau. France
- Institution Notre-Dame de Sainte-Croix, Neuilly-sur-Seine (independent since 1903)

==== Ghana ====
- St. Augustine's College (Ghana), Cape Coast, Ghana
- St John's Secondary School, Sekondi Takoradi, Ghana
- St Brother Andre Senior High School, Kasoa, Ghana

==== Haiti ====
- Collège Notre-Dame, Cap Haitian, Haiti (1904)
- École Père Pérard, Plaisance, Haiti
- École Père Joseph Lepévédic, Limbé, Haiti

==== India ====
- Holy Cross Matriculation Higher Secondary School , Salem, Tamil Nadu, India (1963)
- Notre Dame of Holy Cross School [CBSE ], Gundukallur, Salem, Tamil Nadu, India. [2008]
- Holy Cross International School [CBSE], Salem, Tamil Nadu, India (2021)
- Holy Cross School, Whitefield, Bangalore, India
- Holy Cross School, Agartala, Tripura India (1970)(CISCE)
- Holy Cross School, Tuikarmaw, Tripura (TBSE)
- Holy Cross School, Katalcherra, Tripura (TBSE)
- Holy Cross School, Panisagar, Tripura (TBSE)
- Holy Cross School, Kumarghat, Tripura (TBSE)
- Notredame Holy Cross School, Moharpara, Tripura (TBSE)
- St. Andre English Medium School, Bodhjungnagar, Tripura (CBSE)
- Good Shepherd School, Jongksha, Meghalaya (MBOSE)
- Holy Cross School, Umkiang, Meghalaya (MBOSE)
- Holy Cross School, Mawkynrew, Meghalaya (MBOSE)
- Jeevan Jyothi Technical Institute, Honavar, India
- Holy Cross School, Mizoram, India
- Holy Cross School, Trichy, TN (2002)
- Holy Cross School, Aymanam, Kerala (2003)
- Holy Cross School, Ghanpur, AP (2003)
- St Louis School, Dahisar, Mumbai (2002)
- Abhayadhama, Human Development Centre, Whitefield, Bangalore, Karnataka State (1976)
- Holy Cross School, Ballia, U.P, India

==== Liberia ====
- St. Patrick's High School (Liberia)

==== Uganda ====
- Holy Cross Lake View Senior Secondary School (Wanyange), Jinja District (1993)

==== United States ====
- Holy Cross High School, New Orleans, Louisiana (1849)
- Academy of the Holy Cross, Kensington, Maryland (1868) (Sisters of the Holy Cross)
- Holy Trinity High School, Chicago, Illinois (1910)
- Cathedral High School (Indianapolis), Indianapolis, Ind. (1918–1972; 2011 reaffiliated)
- Reitz Memorial High School, Evansville, Indiana (1925)
- Notre Dame High School (West Haven, Connecticut) (1946)
- Gilmour Academy, Gates Mills, Ohio (1946)
- Notre Dame High School, Sherman Oaks, California (1947)
- St. Edward High School, Lakewood, Ohio, (1949)
- Holy Family High School, Port Allen, Louisiana (1949) (Marianites of Holy Cross)
- Archbishop Hoban High School, Akron, Ohio (1953)
- St. Francis High School, Mountain View, California (1955)
- Notre Dame High School, Fairfield, Connecticut (1955)
- Notre Dame College Preparatory, Niles, Illinois (1955)
- Holy Cross High School, Flushing, New York (1955)
- Holy Cross of San Antonio, San Antonio, Texas (1957)
- St. Edmond's Academy, Wilmington, Delaware (1959)
- Bishop McNamara High School, Forestville, Maryland, (1964)
- Moreau Catholic High School, Hayward, California (1965)
- Holy Cross High School, Waterbury, Connecticut (1968)
- San Juan Diego Catholic High School, Austin, Texas (2019)

=== Primary schools ===
==== Uganda ====
- Holy Cross Primary School (Bugembe), Jinja District
- Saint Andrew's Primary School (Wanyange), Jinja District
- Saint Jude's Primary School, Jinja District

==== United States ====
- St. Edward High School, Lakewood, Ohio (1949)
- St. Ignatius Martyr, Austin, Texas (1940)
- Gilmour Academy, Gates Mills, Ohio (1946)
- Holy Cross School, New Orleans, Louisiana (1849)
- St. John Vianney School, Goodyear, Arizona (1992)
- St. Joseph Grade School, South Bend, Indiana (1854)
- Holy Cross School, South Bend, Indiana (1929)
- St. Adalbert Catholic School, South Bend, Indiana
- Christ the King Catholic School, South Bend, Indiana (1953)
- Holy Redeemer Catholic School, Portland, Oregon (1908)

=== Parishes ===
==== Bangladesh ====
- Holy Cross Church, Luxmibazar, Dhaka
- Church of St. Augustine of Hippo, Mathbari
- St. Joseph Church, Srimangal
- Our Lady of Holy Rosary Cathedral, Chittagong
- Fatima Rani Church, Bandarban
- Shanti Raj Girja Catholic Church, Thanchi
- Church of the Sacred Heart, Gournadi
- Sacred Heart of Jesus Church, Khalibpur
- Corpus Christi Church, Jalchatra
- St. Paul's Church, Pirgacha
- St. George's Church, Mariamnagar

==== Brazil ====
- Paroquia São José do Jaguaré, São Paulo, SP
- Paroquia São Felipe Apostolo, Maua, SP

==== Canada ====
- St. Kevin's Church, Welland, ON
- Holy Name Parish, Toronto, ON
- Our Lady of Perpetual Help Parish, Sherwood Park, AB
- St. Ann Parish, Toronto, ON
- Unité pastorale de Saint-Laurent, Saint-Laurent, QC
- Unité pastorale du Saint-Esprit, Cap-Pelé, NB
- Saint-Gregoire-le-Grand, Mont Saint-Gregoire, QC
- Notre-Dame-des-Champs, Saint-Polycarp, QC
- Saint-Martin de Val-Bélair, Québec, QC

==== Chile ====
- Parroquia San Roque, Santiago (1949)
- Parroquia Nuestra Señora de Andacollo, Santiago (1977)
- Parroquia Nuestra Señora de la Merced, Calle Larga (1989)

==== France ====
- Paroisse Notre-Dame de Sainte-Croix, Le Mans

==== Haiti ====
- Sainte Rose de Lima, Pilate
- Saint Charles Borromée, Le Borgne
- Saint Albert Le Grande, Ravine Trompette, Pilate
- Sainte Marie Madeleine, Duchity
- Notre Dame de l'Esperance/ND du Mont Carmel, Magagnosse/Labadie
- Notre Dame de Guadalupe, Waney, Port-au-Prince
- Saint Jules, Petit Bourg du Borgne
- Paroisse Sainte Elizabeth, Caracol

==== India ====
- St. Joseph Church, Agartala, Tripura
- St. Andre Mission, Bodhjunagar, Tripura
- Good Shepherd Church, Kathalcherra, Tripura
- St. Paul's Catholic Church, Kumarghat, Tripura
- Immaculate Conception Church, Moharpara, Tripura
- St. Mary's Church, Tuikarmaw, Tripura
- Holy Cross Parish, Bagbasa, Tripura
- Good Shepherd Parish, Jongksha, Meghalaya
- Holy Cross Parish, Mawkynrew, Meghalaya
- Holy Cross Parish, Umkiang, Meghalaya
- Holy Cross Church, Champhai, Mizoram
- St. John Parish, Khawzawl, Mizoram
- Holy Cross Parish, Koloriang, Arunachal Pradesh
- St. Sebastian Church, Loliem, Goa
- St Vincent De Paul Church, Katapady, Karnataka
- Nirmal Matha Church, Abadi Ghanpur, Andhra Pradesh
- Christ the King Parish, Pune, Maharashtra
- St. Joseph Church, Chengalam, Kottayam, Kerala
- St. Louis Parish Centre, Dahisar, Mumbai, Maharashtra
- Sts. Peter and Paul Church, Dindigal, Tamil Nadu
- St. Sebastian Church, Idukki, Kerala

==== Kenya ====
- Holy Cross Parish Community, Dandora, Nairobi

==== Mexico ====
- Parroquia Nuestra Madre de la Luz, Monterrey, Nuevo León (1996)
- Parroquia San José, Tamán, San Luis Potosí (2011)

==== Peru ====
- Parroquia El Señor de la Esperanza, Canto Grande, Lima

==== Tanzania ====
- St. Brendan Parish, Kitete

==== Uganda ====
- Holy Cross Parish Community, Bugembe, Jinja
- St. Jude Thaddeus Parish Community, Kyarusozi, Fort Portal

==== United States ====
- Christ the King Parish, South Bend, Indiana (1933)
- Holy Cross Parish (1929) and St. Stanislaus Parish (1899), South Bend, Indiana
- Holy Cross Parish, South Easton, Massachusetts (1967)
- Holy Redeemer Parish, Portland, Oregon (2002)
- Sacred Heart Parish, Colorado Springs, Colorado (1984) (Including Mission Parishes of Holy Rosary and Our Lady of Perpetual Help)
- Sacred Heart Parish, Notre Dame, Indiana (1842)
- Sacred Heart Saint Francis de Sales Parish, Bennington, Vermont (1854 & 1880)
- St. Adalbert Parish, South Bend (2003) and St. Casimir Parish, South Bend, Indiana (1897)
- St. Ignatius Martyr Parish, Austin, Texas (1938)
- St. John Vianney Parish, Goodyear, Arizona (1981)
- St. Joseph Parish, South Bend, Indiana (1853)
- St. André Bessette Parish, Portland, Oregon (2001)
- St. John the Evangelist Parish, Viera, Florida (2001)

=== Other ===
- Ave Maria Press
- Holy Cross Family Ministries
  - Family Theater Productions
  - Family Rosary Crusade
