= Jean-Zaché Duracin =

Haitian bishop

The Right Reverend Jean-Zaché Duracin
- Bishop of Haiti
- Church: Episcopal Church
- Diocese: Haiti
- Elected: December 16, 1992
- In office: 1994-present
- Predecessor: Luc Garnier

Orders
- Consecration: June 2, 1993 by Edmond L. Browning

Personal details
- Born: 1947 (age 78–79)
- Denomination: Anglican

Jean-Zaché Duracin (born 1947) is a bishop of the Episcopal Church. In 2023, he is serving as the Bishop of Haiti.

== Biography ==
Prior to his election as bishop, he served as Dean of Holy Trinity Cathedral in Port-au-Prince. He was elected on December 16, 1992 as Coadjutor Bishop of Haiti and was consecrated on June 2, 1993. He succeeded as diocesan in 1994.

== See also ==
- Religion in Haiti
- Christianity in Haiti
- Protestantism in Haiti
