= Voodoo: Truth and Fantasy =

1993 book by Laënnec Hurbon

- First French edition. The cover featuring the painting Loa by Haitian artist Denis Smith.
- Author: Laënnec Hurbon
- Original title: Les Mystères du vaudou
- Translator: Lory Frankel
- Cover artist: Denis Smith (FR & US eds.); Edouard Duval-Carrié (UK ed.)
- Language: French
- Series: Découvertes Gallimard●Religions (FR); New Horizons (UK); Abrams Discoveries (US)
- Release number: 190th in collection
- Subject: Haitian Vodou
- Genre: Nonfiction monograph
- Publisher: Éditions Gallimard (FR); Thames & Hudson (UK); Harry N. Abrams (US)
- Publication date: 4 November 1993
- Publication place: France
- English publication date: 1995
- Media type: Print (paperback)
- Pages: 176 pp
- ISBN: 978-2-0705-3186-8 (first edition)
- OCLC: 718685754
- Preceded by: Premiers chrétiens, premiers martyrs
- Followed by: Il était une fois la Mésopotamie

Voodoo: Truth and Fantasy (US title: Voodoo: Search for the Spirit; French: Les Mystères du vaudou, lit. 'The Mysteries of Vodou') is a 1993 illustrated monograph on Haitian Vodou. Written by the Haitian sociologist of religion Laënnec Hurbon, and published in pocket format by Éditions Gallimard as the 190th volume in their 'Découvertes' collection (known as 'New Horizons' in the United Kingdom, and 'Abrams Discoveries' in the United States).

== Introduction and synopsis ==
From left: UK and US editions.

(Note: In this section, English titles and texts excerpted from the book are based on the British edition:.)

The book is part of the Religions series in the 'Découvertes Gallimard' collection. According to the tradition of 'Découvertes', which is based on an abundant pictorial documentation and a way of bringing together visual documents and texts, enhanced by printing on coated paper, as commented in L'Express, 'genuine monographs, published like art books'. It's almost like a 'graphic novel', replete with colour plates.

Rooted in history of Haiti, the author presents Haitian Vodou in its multiple aspects. After many persecutions—those of the slave society, the Catholic Church, the racism, the horror sensations due to devils and zombies, also of Haitian authorities after the independence, even though Vodou has supported the freedom to slaves—after the drastic political exploitation by François Duvalier, Vodou remains 'one of the most inalienable cultural resources of Haitian people'. The book also suggests the complex role played by Vodou in the fall of Duvalier's dictatorship.

The structure of the book is dictated by this historico-political perspective, the body text is divided into seven chapters: I, 'The Great Crossing'; II, 'Voodoo Hidden in the Hell of Slavery'; III, 'Campaigns Against Sorcery'; IV, 'The Spirit of the "Lwa"'; V, 'The Cult of the Dead'; VI, '"Manjé-Lwa", "Dansé-Lwa": The Services'; VII, 'An Astonishing Survival'. The first three chapters trace the history of Vodou in Haiti from 'the great crossing' to the time of the American occupation (1915–1934) and the advent of Duvalier (chap. III), going through the period when 'Vodou hidden in the hell of slavery' (chap. II). It is only then that Hurbon systematically exposes the beliefs and practices of Vodou as a system articulating a mythology, rituals and standards of behaviour (chaps. IV–VI).

The last chapter is devoted to the 'astonishing survival' of Vodou. Hurbon addresses the issue of the establishment of Protestant sects that 'by passing off all the lwa as evil or satanic forces, the message of the Protestant sects revives the fantasy of sorcery', and also questions whether 'Voodoo has a tendency to draw its worshippers towards the past, placing them under the authority of tradition (symbolized by the dead, the ancestors, the lwa) rather than more flexible rules, subject to modern rational thinking?' Whatever the case may be, Vodou is 'a piece of worldwide cultural patrimony', and a civilisation 'extending from Africa to the Americas'. The following 'Documents' section contains a compilation of excerpts divided into six parts: 1, The devil, voodoo and the missionaries; 2, The antisuperstitious campaigns; 3, How the lwa show themselves to humans; 4, For the rehabilitation of voodoo; 5, Voodoo in art; 6, People travel, so do spirits. These are followed by a glossary, chronology, further reading, list of illustrations and index.

The book is profusely illustrated with colour plates—drawings, photographs, Haitian paintings, etc.—so it could also serve indirectly as a study of Haitian Vodou iconography. It has been translated into English (UK & US), Russian, South Korean and Spanish.

== Reception ==
On Babelio, the book has an average of 3.71/5 based on 7 ratings. Goodreads reported, based on 57 ratings, the US edition gets an average rating of 3.88 out of 5, the UK edition 3.33/5 based on 9 ratings, and the French and Spanish editions 3.50/5 based on 10 ratings, indicating 'generally positive opinions'.

In the Journal of Haitian Studies (2000), Professor Patrick Bellegarde-Smith sees the work as a 'small "big book"': 'Laënnec Hurbon [...] gives us a small and eminently affordable jewel of a book, Voodoo: Search for the Spirit. It is a pint-sized coffee table book 5×7, replete with color plates and chock-full of accurate and detailed information on Haitian Vodun. [...] At such a reasonable price per copy, this small "big book" is a gift from the Gods. Hurbon's fastidious research in Haiti, the Caribbean and in West Africa, makes the book a compendium of the latest scholarship on Haiti's national religion.' He also notes that the original French edition printed many of the black and white photographs in 'Documents' section on better paper than the English edition; as well as the mistranslation of the term Vaudou by using Voodoo instead of Vodou.

In her book review for the journal L'Homme et la société (1993), CNRS researcher Christiane Veauvy writes: 'This small volume is a great achievement. [...] The interplay between the text and the "iconography" (illustration), is of an exceptional beauty, and the testimonies and documents, the complementarity has been established with precision—photos, drawings, Haitian Vodou works of art which are indeed stunning, are systematically accompanied by a caption—, in a harmony that amazes the reader.'

The sociologist Françoise Champion writes in the journal Archives de sciences sociales des religions (1997): 'With this book, we have a complete and excellent point on Vodou in its multiple dimensions. It should be noted, however, that the perspective adopted—the close interweaving of Vodou and Haitian history—limits another perspective, suggested here and there: that of the continued unity of Afro-American religions and even, beyond according to L. H., of a civilisation "stretching from Africa to the Americas". The author's commitment, his scientifically controlled warmth, adds to the charm of the book. And the "iconography" (illustration), is likewise superb.'

== See also ==
- Christianity and Vodou
- Religion in Haiti
