= Jean Chavannes Jeune =

Haitian pastor and politician

Jean Chavannes Jeune (French pronunciation: [ʒɑ̃ ʃavan ʒœn]) is a Haiti Christian leader, pastor and evangelist, who was a candidate for president in the 2006 Haitian general election for the Christian National Union for the Reconstruction of Haiti. He finished in fourth position. He was a Vice President of Haiti in 1988–89.

== Early life and education ==
Born in Haiti on December 29, 1953, Chavannes Jeune grew up in an evangelistic household. His father Pastor Beauvil Jeune was a pioneer of the Evangelical Baptist Mission of South Haiti (MEBSH). During a Vacation Bible School at age seven, Chavannes made his own personal commitment to Christ, followed by baptism at fourteen.

He studied civil engineering at the Institut Supérieur Technique d'Haïti and graduated in 1976. He also studied theology at the Institut Biblique Lumière and earned a bachelor's degree in 1976. Then he studied public administration at the University of Washington and earned a master's degree in 1979. He also studied development and communication at Chicago Wheaton College and earned a Bachelor of Arts in 1983. His postdoctoral studies were dedicated to theology, sociology and development administration at Columbia Bible School in North Carolina.

== Ministry ==
In 1976, he became Deputy Director of the Integrated Rural Development Program (IRD) of the Evangelical Baptist Mission of South Haiti, until 1979. In 1979, he became a consultant for the Council of Evangelical Churches of Haiti, until 1988. In 1982, he became Director of the Child Survival Program of World Relief in Haiti until 1992. In 1987, he became President of Habitat for Humanity Haiti, until 1997. In 1990, he became General Coordinator of the Evangelical Baptist Mission until 1992. In 1990, he became Chairman of the Board of Directors of the Evangelical Baptist Mission until 1995. In 1992, he became Co-Director of Radio Lumière until 1994. In 1991, he became Vice-President of the National Committee of Habitat for Humanity until 1996. In 1991, he became Vice-President of the National Union of the Full Gospel Business Men's Fellowship International until 1996. In 1996, he became Professor of Human Resources at the Light University until 1997. In 1997, he became President of the Baptist Evangelical Mission until 2002. In 2016, he became rector of the Light University.

== Political career ==
Jeune served as Vice President of Haiti for thirteen months in 1988–89.

Jeune was elected as the leader of Christian National Union for the Reconstruction of Haiti in 2005 and was its presidential candidate for the 2006 elections.

He announced his candidacy for president in his hometown of Les Cayes on Wednesday, August 10, 2005. He is one of the advisor of Haiti's President Joseph Michel Martelly.

In 2015 he was elected leader of the CANAAN political party.. He retired in 2016.

== Personal life ==
Jeune is married to Marie Lucie Carisma (a Business Administration specialist) with whom he was 4 children (3 sons and 1 daughter).

== Honors ==
He received an Honorary Doctorate in Theology from the Atlantic College of the Bahamas.
