= List of cathedrals in Haiti =

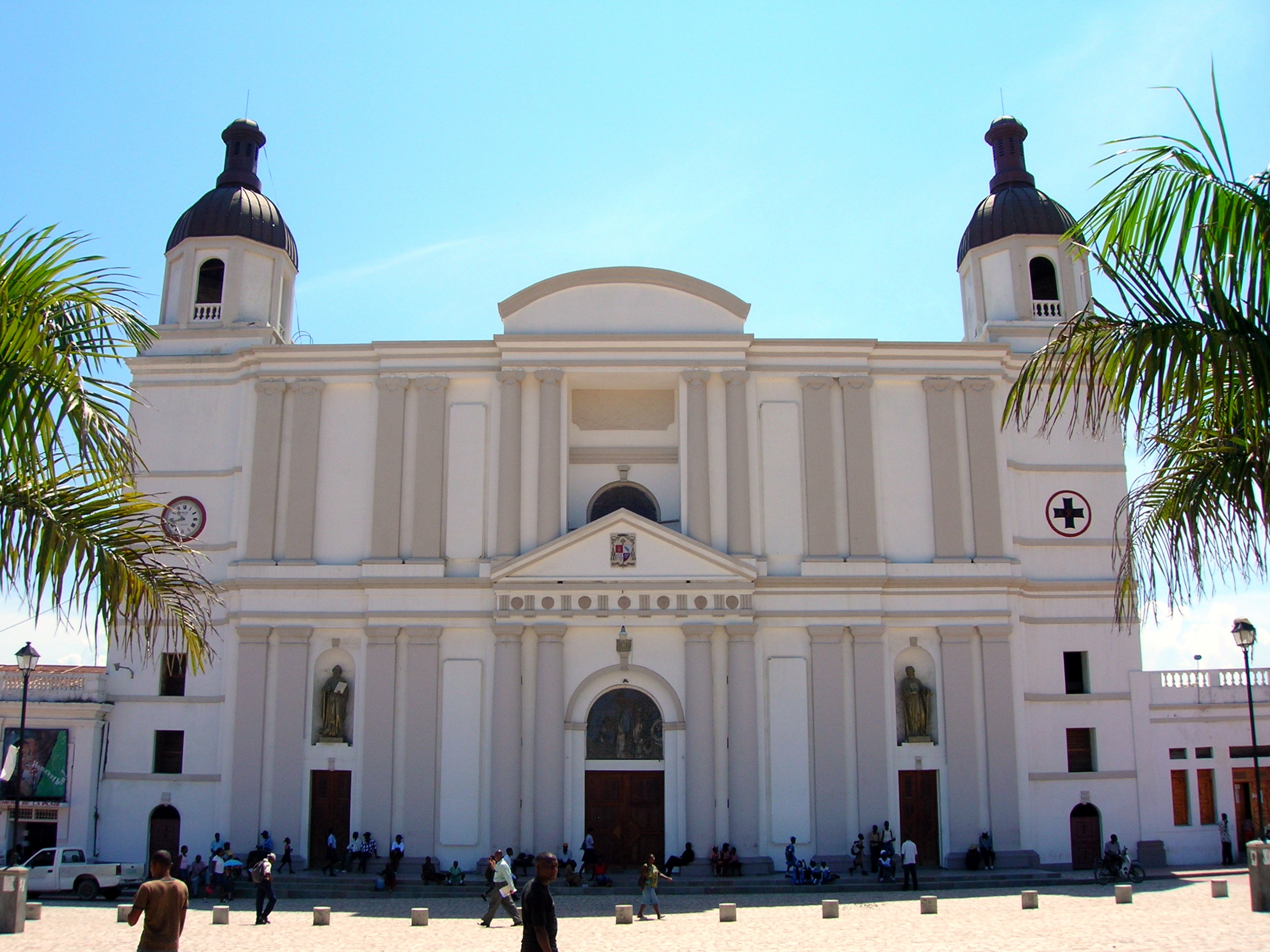
Cathedral of Our Lady of the Assumption in Cap-Haïtien

This is the list of cathedrals in Haiti sorted by denomination.

== Catholic ==
Cathedrals of the Catholic Church in Haiti:

1. Cathedral of St. Anne in Anse-à-Veau
2. Cathedral of Our Lady of the Assumption in Cap-Haïtien
3. Cathedral of St. Joseph in Fort-Liberté
4. Cathedral of the Immaculate Conception in Hinche
5. Cathedral of St. James and St. Philip in Jacmel
6. Cathedral of St. Louis King of France in Jérémie
7. Cathedral of Our Lady of the Assumption in Les Cayes
8. Cathedral of St. Charles Borromeo in Gonaïves
9. Cathedral of Our Lady of the Assumption in Port-au-Prince; destroyed in the 2010 earthquake
10. Cathedral of the Immaculate Conception in Port-de-Paix
11. Co-Cathedral of St. John the Baptist in Miragoâne

== Anglican ==
Anglican Cathedrals in Haiti:

- Holy Trinity Cathedral in Port-au-Prince

== See also ==
- Lists of cathedrals
- Christianity in Haiti
