= The Church of Jesus Christ of Latter-day Saints in Haiti =

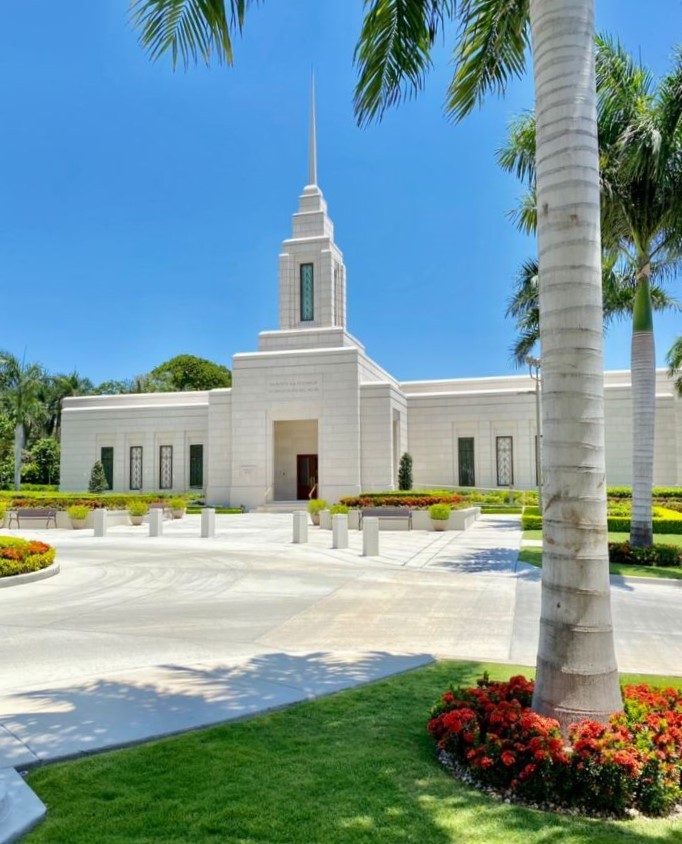
- The Port-au-Prince Haiti Temple
- Area: Caribbean
- Members: 25,550 (2025)
- Stakes: 5
- Districts: 4
- Wards: 31
- Branches: 25
- Total congregations: 56
- Missions: 1
- Temples: 1
- FamilySearch Centers: 14

The Church of Jesus Christ of Latter-day Saints in Haiti refers to the Church of Jesus Christ of Latter-day Saints (LDS Church) and its members in Haiti. The first branch (small congregation) was formed in 1980. As of December 31, 2025, there were 25,550 members in 56 congregations in Haiti.

== History ==
Membership In Haiti
Year	Membership
1983	485
1989*	4,200
1999	8,157
2009	15,489
2019	24,192
2025	25,550
1989 membership was published as a rounded number. Source: Jim M. Wall, Deseret News, various years, Church Almanac Country Information: Haiti, Windall J. Ashton

The first member of the church in Haiti, Alexandre Mourra, a storekeeper, wrote a letter to Richard L. Millett, president of the church's Florida Ft. Lauderdale Mission, requesting a copy of the Book of Mormon after he read a pamphlet about Joseph Smith. After reading the book, Mourrga traveled to Florida and was baptized on June 30, 1977. He then shared his findings on the church and on July 2, 1978, Millett and his counselors traveled to Haiti to preside over the baptism of 22 Haitians near Port-au-Prince. The first four full-time missionaries were transferred from the Paris France Mission and to Haiti in May 1980. The first branch was established that October, with Mourra as president. On December 19, 1982, the Haiti District was created.

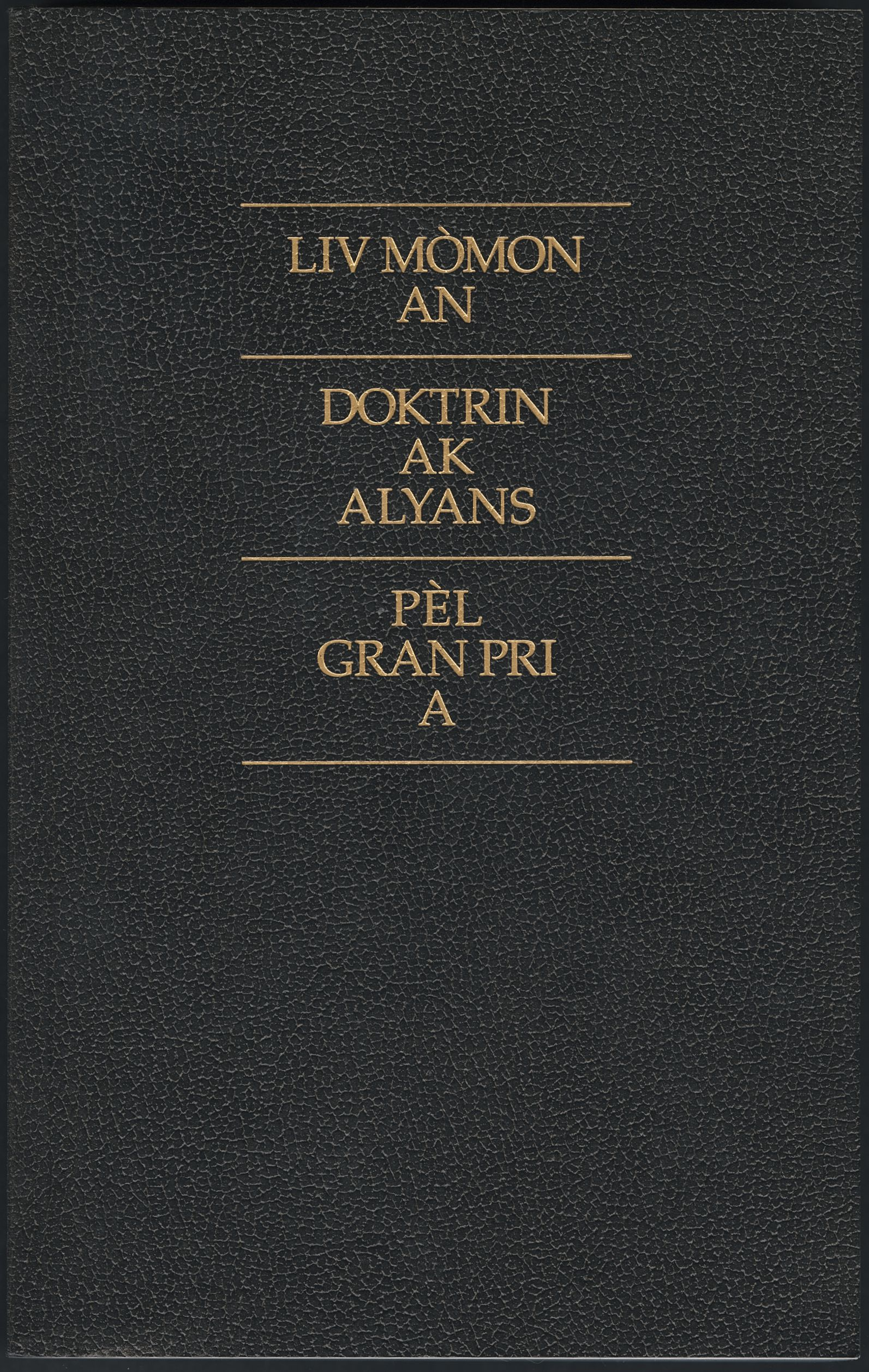
The Book of Mormon, Doctrine and Covenants, and Pearl of Great Price in Haitian Creole.

On November 29, 1983, selections from the Book of Mormon were published in Haitian Creole. In 1999, the complete translation of the Book of Mormon was published, followed by the translation into Haitian Creole of the Doctrine and Covenants. The Pearl of Great Price was published in July 2007.

By 2001, all church congregations were led by local members rather than missionaries. At the church's April 2009 General Conference, Fouchard Pierre-Nau, a native of Jérémie, was called as an area seventy in the church's Fourth Quorum of the Seventy, the most prominent church position ever held by a Haitian up to that time.

Most of the church's buildings sustained little to no damage in the 2010 Haiti earthquake. Church buildings became temporary hospitals and shelters during the aftermath of the quake. Several church members from Haiti, the United States, and other nations assisted with the medical, cleanup, and rebuilding that occurred following the quake. The church also provided substantial relief in the aftermath of Hurricane Hanna and other tropical cyclones.

== Stakes and Districts ==
The Port-au-Prince Haiti Stake, the first stake in Haiti, was organized on September 21, 1997, with Reynolds Antoine Saint-Louis as president. On September 7, 2003, the Port-au-Prince North Stake was organized. In September 2012, the third and fourth Haitian stakes were created in Carrefour and Croix-des-Missions. A fifth, based in Petit-Goâve and named the Les Palmes Haiti Stake, was formed on September 9, 2018.

As of July 2026, Haiti had the following stakes and districts:

Stake/District	Organized
Artibonite Haiti Stake	12 July 2026
Cap-Haïtien Haiti District	11 Mar 2018
Carrefour Haiti Stake	9 Sep 2012
Croix-des-Missions Haiti Stake	16 Sep 2012
Les Cayes Haiti District	6 Feb 1990
Les Palmes Haiti Stake	9 Sep 2018
Port-au-Prince Haiti North Stake	7 Sep 2003
Port-au-Prince Haiti Stake	31 Aug 1990
Port-de-Paix Haiti District	28 Nov 1999

== Missions ==
Haiti was part of the Florida Ft. Lauderdale Mission when the first convert inquired of the church in 1977. Missionary work opened for Haiti in 1980 and in 1982, there were 12 missionaries serving in Haiti from the West Indies Mission. The Pout-au-Prince Mission was organized on August 1, 1984. Following a military coup in October 1991, the church withdrew foreign missionaries from Haiti. Foreign missionaries returned in July 1999.

- Haiti Port-au-Prince Mission

== Temples ==
On September 17, 2000, the Santo Domingo Dominican Republic Temple was dedicated, making temple ordinances more accessible for Haitian members. The Port-au-Prince Haiti Temple was dedicated on September 1, 2019, by David A. Bednar.

165. Port-au-Prince Haiti Temple; Official website; News & images	
Location: Announced: Groundbreaking: Dedicated: Size:	Pétion-Ville, Haiti; 5 April 2015 by Thomas S. Monson; 28 October 2017 by Walter F. González; 1 September 2019 by David A. Bednar; 10,396 sq ft (965.8 m^{2}) on a 1.77-acre (0.72 ha) site

== See also ==
- Religion in Haiti
