= Baptist Convention of Haiti =

Baptist Christian denomination

- Convention Baptiste d'Haïti
- Abbreviation: CBH
- Classification: Evangelical Christianity
- Theology: Baptist
- Associations: Baptist World Alliance
- Headquarters: Cap-Haïtien, Haiti
- Origin: 1914
- Congregations: 112
- Members: 50,000
- Tertiary institutions: Christian University of Northern Haiti

Baptist Convention of Haiti (French: Convention Baptiste d'Haïti) is a Baptist Christian denomination, affiliated with the Baptist World Alliance, headquartered in Cap-Haïtien, Haiti.

== History ==
The Baptist Convention of Haiti has its origins in a mission of the Baptist Missionary Society in 1823 in Cap-Haïtien. In 1923, during U.S. occupation of Haiti, the American Baptist Home Mission Society established and worked at the union of Baptist churches. The Convention is officially formed in 1964.

According to a census published by the association in 2023, it claimed 112 churches and 50,000 members.

== Schools ==
In 1994, it founded the Christian University of Northern Haiti.

== See also ==
- Religion in Haiti
- Christianity in Haiti
- Protestantism in Haiti
- Bible
- Born again
- Baptist beliefs
- Jesus Christ
- Believers' Church
