= Luc Garnier =

Haitian bishop

The Right Reverend Luc Garnier D.D.
- Bishop of Haiti
- Church: Episcopal Church
- Diocese: Haiti
- In office: 1971–1994
- Predecessor: C. Alfred Voegeli
- Successor: Jean-Zaché Duracin

Orders
- Ordination: November 1956 by C. Alfred Voegeli
- Consecration: April 20, 1971 by John E. Hines

Personal details
- Born: December 21, 1928 Maïssade, Haiti
- Died: May 1, 1999 (aged 70) Port-au-Prince, Haiti
- Denomination: Anglican
- Spouse: Marguerite Myrtil
- Children: 5

Luc Anatole Jacques Garnier (December 21, 1928 - May 1, 1999) was the fourth bishop of the Episcopal Diocese of Haiti between 1971 and 1994.

== Biography ==
Garnier was born on December 21, 1928, in Maïssade, Haiti. He attended the theological school in Haiti and graduated in 1956. In April, 1956 he was ordained deacon and that same November he was ordained priest by Bishop C. Alfred Voegeli. He became priest-in-charge of Gros Morne and Gonaïves. Then, in 1961 he was appointed rector of the Church of the Epiphany in Port-au-Prince while a year later he became the Dean of Trinity Cathedral. In the absence of a bishop, after C. Alfred Voegeli was deported from Haiti, Garnier was appointed as administrator of the diocese in 1969. He was elected to succeed Voegeli and was consecrated in Trinity Cathedral on April 20, 1971, with Presiding Bishop John E. Hines as chief consecrator. He was the first native to serve the post. He retired in 1994 and died on May 1, 1999, in Port-au-Prince.
