= Harry Roberts Carson =

American bishop

The Right Reverend Harry Roberts Carson D.D.
- Bishop of Haiti
- Church: Episcopal Church
- Diocese: Haiti
- Elected: 1922
- In office: 1923–1943
- Predecessor: James Theodore Holly
- Successor: C. Alfred Voegeli

Orders
- Ordination: January 10, 1896 by Davis Sessums
- Consecration: January 10, 1923 by Daniel S. Tuttle

Personal details
- Born: December 8, 1869 Petersburg, Nebraska, United States
- Died: July 13, 1948 (aged 78) Port-au-Prince, Haiti
- Buried: Holy Trinity Cathedral, Port-au-Prince
- Denomination: Anglican
- Parents: Henry Samuel Carson & Mary Thomas
- Spouse: Zoe Theotiste Garig
- Children: 1

Harry Roberts Carson (December 8, 1869 - July 13, 1948) was an American Episcopal cleric who served as bishop of the Episcopal Diocese of Haiti from 1923 to 1943.

== Biography ==
Carson was born on December 8, 1869, in Norristown, Pennsylvania, the son of Henry Samuel Carson and Mary Thomas. He studied at Sewanee: The University of the South between 1893 and 1895. After graduation he was ordained deacon on January 1, 1895, and priest on January 10, 1896, by the Bishop of Louisiana Davis Sessums in Christ Church Cathedral (New Orleans). He then served as a general missionary in the Diocese of Louisiana until 1898, after which he became a navy chaplain in the Spanish–American War. He then served as rector of St Mary's Church in Franklin, Louisiana between 1899 and 1904. In 1904 he became rector of Grace Church in Monroe, Louisiana, while in 1910 he was appointed Archdeacon of Northern Louisiana, a post he retained till 1912. Afterwards he became chaplain at Ancon Hospital in the Panama Canal Zone and Archdeacon of Panama between 1913 and 1922.

He was elected Missionary Bishop of Haiti in 1922 and was consecrated to the episcopate on January 10, 1923, with Presiding Bishop Daniel S. Tuttle as chief consecrator. As from January 1, 1928, he was also Bishop in charge of the Dominican Republic. He retired in 1943 and died on July 13, 1948, in Port-au-Prince, Haiti.
