= Islam in Haiti =

Islam in Haiti consists of a small minority of Muslims forming less than 1% of the total population, composed of locals and foreign immigrants. A number of mosques and Islamic organizations are present in the country.

Islam was introduced from Africa during the slave trade period (starting 16th century), but orthodox religious beliefs declined in Haiti in the years that followed. It was then reintroduced by Arab immigrants in 1922 when they met with the very few native Haitian Muslims left and it has been slowly growing from then up to the present. Muslims can practice their religion freely and Islamic studies are available.

== Organizations ==
Islamic organizations in Haiti include the Bilal Mosque and Islamic Center in Cap-Haïtien, which offers programs in Islamic studies and daily prayers. Other notable organizations include Masjid Shaheed Haiti Miragoâne Mosque in Miragoâne and the Centre Spirituel Allah ou Akbar in Port-au-Prince. Masjid Tawhid Haiti laid and is near completion,. In Gonaives, Mosque-al-Munawwar is the first mosque built by a Pakistani army officer, Major Saifullah while serving in MINUSTAH and named after his father Munawar Sultan Randhawa (a veteran Pakistani athlete) in 2008. This mosque has since been serving as a hub for charity works and was handed over to newly-converted Muslim locals. After the 2010 earthquake a number of Islamic organisations and relief groups visited the country with the purpose of rendering aid. Mufti Shaheed Mohammed has established a Darul Uloom in the Miragoâne area which caters for Muslims of the entire country.

== History ==
The history of Islam on the island of Hispaniola (which Haiti shares with the Dominican Republic) began with slavery in Haïti. Additionally, a revisionist history of Dutty Boukman, whose death is largely considered the start of the Haitian Revolution, suggests that he was Muslim. In the early portion of the 20th century, a wave of Christian Arab immigrants came to the Americas, in which a surprisingly noticeable amount settled in Haiti (and other countries as well, including Lebanon and Syria).

It is said that the first to arrive in Haiti around 1920 was a man hailing from the Moroccan village of Fes along with 19 other families. Today, the majority of the country's Muslims are indigenous Haitians, followed by the ethnic Moroccans. As a result of limited financial resources, they were unable to build a mosque or school until 1985, when a residence was converted into a mosque and a minaret was constructed.

In 2000, Nawoon Marcellus, a member of Fanmi Lavalas from San Raphael, became the first Muslim elected to the Chamber of Deputies of Haïti.

After the 2010 Haiti earthquake, the numerous relief organizations included Islamic oriented organizations. By 2011, the capital Port-au-Prince had at least five mosques, a Muslim parliament member and a nightly local television program devoted to Islam.

Currently, Haiti does not recognize Islamic marriages, and does not recognize Islamic clergy. Because of the safety concerns, it is not always possible for Muslims to practice their religion safely.

== Demographics ==
The population of Muslims in Haiti is ~10,000. Most Muslims are local Haitians and immigrants from Trinidad and Tobago. Majority of the Muslims in Haiti are Sunni Muslims. There are also members of the Ahmaddiyya community, which in 2021, had their community registered with the BOW (Bureau of Worship). They also had schools registered with the Ministry of Education, which allowed students to take exams.

Some of the members of the Islamic community are also members of the Nation of Islam. Louis Farrakhan visited after the earthquake.

== See also ==
- Syrian Haitians
- Religion in Haiti
- Islam in Trinidad and Tobago
- Latin American Muslims
- Latino Muslims
