= Port-au-Prince Haiti Temple =

Temple

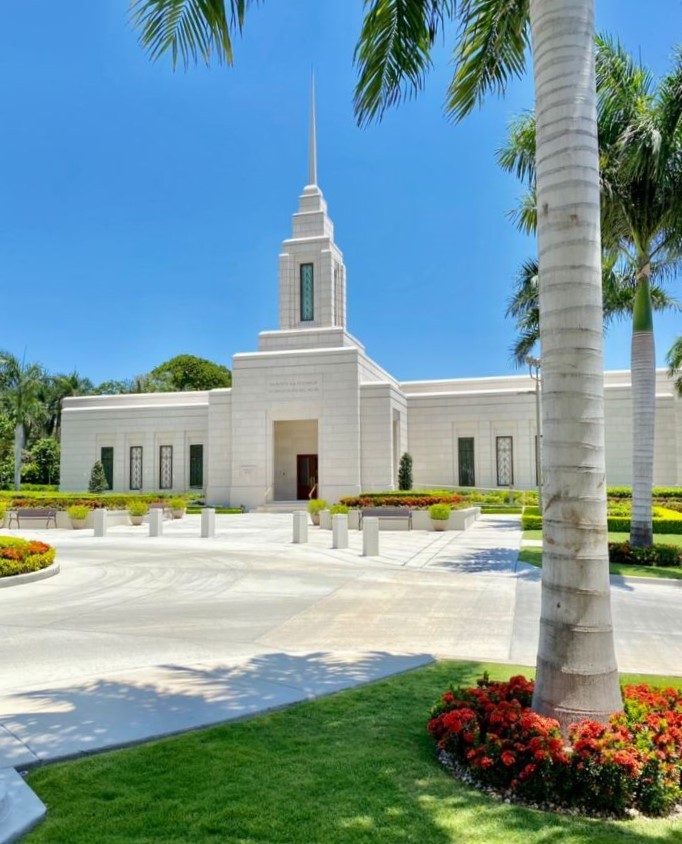
- Interactive map of Port-au-Prince Haiti Temple
- Number: 165
- Dedication: 1 September 2019, by David A. Bednar
- Site: 1.77 acres (0.72 ha)
- Floor area: 10,396 ft^{2} (965.8 m^{2})
- Official website • News & images

Church chronology
← Fortaleza Brazil Temple	Port-au-Prince Haiti Temple	→ Lisbon Portugal Temple

Additional information
- Announced: 5 April 2015, by Thomas S. Monson
- Groundbreaking: 28 October 2017, by Walter F. González
- Open house: 3–17 August 2019
- Current president: Hubermann Bien Aimé
- Location: Pétion-Ville, Haiti
- Coordinates: 18°31′43.1436″N 72°16′4.7964″W
- Baptistries: 1
- Ordinance rooms: 1
- Sealing rooms: 1

The Port‑au‑Prince Haiti Temple is a temple of the Church of Jesus Christ of Latter-day Saints located in Pétion‑Ville, a suburb of Port‑au‑Prince, Haiti. It was announced by church president Thomas S. Monson on April 5, 2015, during general conference. It is the first temple in Haiti, the second in the Caribbean, and the church's 165th operating temple worldwide.

Construction began with a groundbreaking ceremony on October 28, 2017, led by Walter F. González, president of the church's Caribbean Area. After construction was complete, a public open house was held from August 8 to 17, 2019, followed by its dedication on September 1, 2019, by David A. Bednar, of the Quorum of the Twelve Apostles. The structure is 10,396-square-feet (0.24-acre), and has tropical landscaping, palm motifs, and a limestone façade. The temple includes one ordinance room and one sealing room.

== History ==
The intent to construct the Port‑au‑Prince Haiti Temple was announced by church president Thomas S. Monson on April 5, 2015, during the general conference, with the Abidjan Ivory Coast and Bangkok Thailand temples announced at the same time. At a stake conference on March 12, 2017, apostle Neil L. Andersen announced the location for the temple would be behind the existing Route de Frères meetinghouse.

A groundbreaking ceremony occurred on October 28, 2017, with Walter F. González, a general authority who was president of the Caribbean Area. It was attended by local community leaders, including the mayor of Pétion‑Ville

A public open house was held from August 8 through August 17, 2019 (excluding Sunday). In conjunction with the temple’s dedication, a youth devotional was held on August 31, 2019, in Port-au-Prince, where apostle David A. Bednar encouraged Haitian youth to embrace temple worship as a source of spiritual strength and identity. Member participants expressed that visiting the temple and attending the devotional deepened their faith and increased their pride in being Latter-day Saints.

The Port‑au‑Prince Haiti Temple was dedicated by Bednar on September 1, 2019, with three sessions held. At the time of its dedication, the temple district included the five stakes and four districts in Haiti, with approximately 24,000 members.

The temple is the church's first in Haiti, second in the Caribbean, and 165th worldwide.

In 2020, like all the church's others, the Port-au-Prince Haiti Temple was closed for a time in response to the COVID-19 pandemic.

On August 14, 2021, a 7.2 magnitude earthquake struck Haiti, but the temple was not damaged.

== Design and architecture ==
The temple is on a 10,396-square-foot (0.24-acre) property in Pétion-Ville, with tropical gardens planted with palm trees, shrubs, and sod. The temple’s exterior has a limestone façade. The interior has one ordinance room and one sealing room The design includes Swarovski crystal chandeliers (from Austria), with Venetian hand-blown glass fixtures in the bride’s room. The design merges ceremonial functionality with Haitian motifs, such as tropical plant life and native color schemes, including the hibiscus—Haiti’s national flower—and palm leaves woven into the carpets, art glass, and upholstery. These use a palette of turquoise, lime green, blue, and gold.

== Temple presidents and admittance ==
The church's temples are directed by a temple president and matron, each typically serving for a term of three years. The president and matron oversee the administration of temple operations and provide guidance and training for both temple patrons and staff.

Serving from 2019 to 2023, Fritzner A. Joseph was the first president, with Marie-Gina M. Joseph serving as matron. He was previously president of the Haiti Port-au-Prince Mission and was also one of the church's first Haitian full-time missionaries. As of 2023, Hubermann Bien Aimé is the president with Maggy L. Bien Aimé serving as matron.

=== Admittance ===
On June 24, 2019, the church announced the public open house that was held from August 8 to August 17, 2019. The temple was dedicated on September 1, 2019, by apostle David A. Bednar. Like all the church's temples, it is not used for Sunday worship services. To members of the church, temples are regarded as sacred houses of the Lord. Once dedicated, only church members with a current temple recommend can enter for worship.

== See also ==
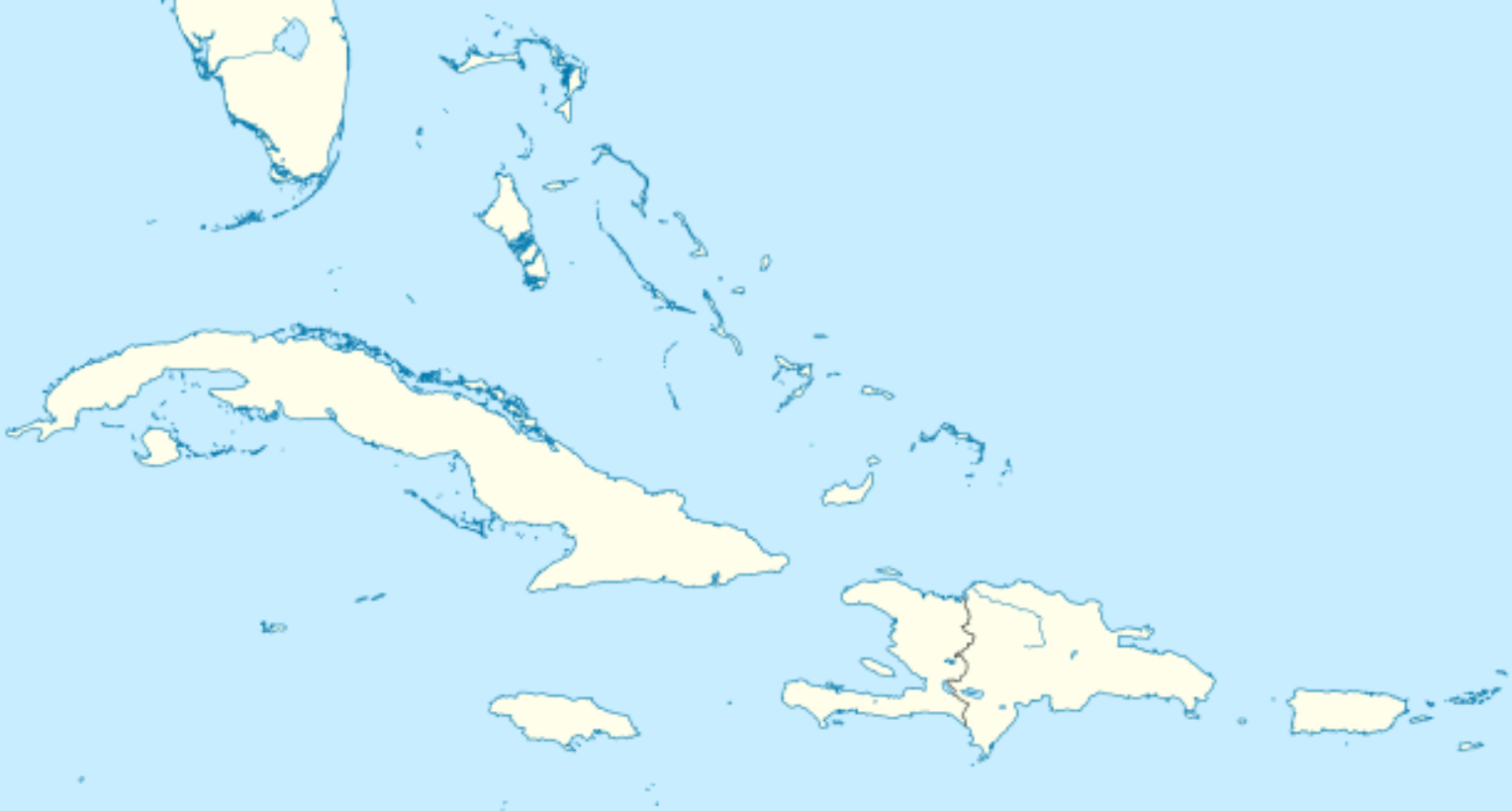

Temples in the Caribbean
= Operating
= Under construction
= Announced
= Temporarily Closed

- The Church of Jesus Christ of Latter-day Saints in Haiti
- Comparison of temples of The Church of Jesus Christ of Latter-day Saints
- List of temples of The Church of Jesus Christ of Latter-day Saints
- List of temples of The Church of Jesus Christ of Latter-day Saints by geographic region
- Temple architecture (Latter-day Saints)
- Religion in Haiti - The Church of Jesus Christ of Latter-day Saints
