= The Church of Jesus Christ of Latter-day Saints in the Dominican Republic =

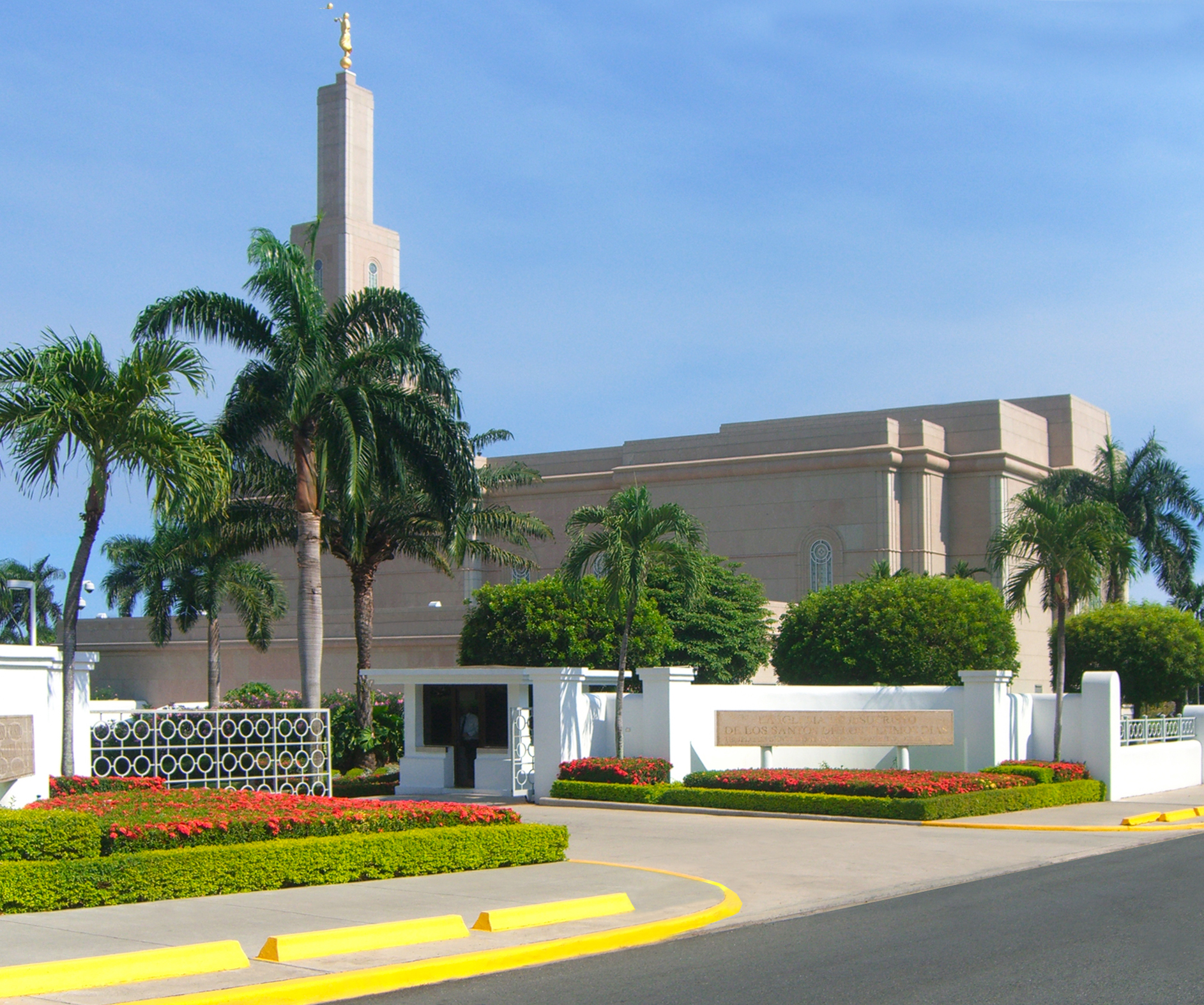
- The Santo Domingo Dominican Republic Temple
- Area: Caribbean
- Members: 156,358 (2025)
- Stakes: 22
- Districts: 9
- Wards: 145
- Branches: 58
- Total Congregations: 203
- Missions: 4
- Temples: 1 operating; 1 announced; 2 total
- FamilySearch Centers: 61

The Church of Jesus Christ of Latter-day Saints in the Dominican Republic refers to the Church of Jesus Christ of Latter-day Saints (LDS Church) and its members in Dominican Republic. The LDS Church has had a presence in the Dominican Republic since 1978. With 156,358 members in 203 congregations, Dominican Republic has the largest body of LDS Church members in the Caribbean. It also has the highest members per capita rate in the Caribbean.

== History ==
Membership in the Dominican Republic
Year	Membership
1978*	100
1989*	19,000
1999	69,466
2009	110,036
2019	143,870
2025	156,358
*Membership was published as a rounded number.

On 7 December 1978, the Dominican Republic was dedicated for the preaching of the doctrine of the Church of Jesus Christ of Later-day Saints by Apostle M. Russell Ballard. The first person baptized in the country was Rodolfo N. Bodden. Bodden had been introduced to the LDS Church by his friends Eddie and Mercedes Amparo, Dominican Mormons who had joined the LDS Church in New York City and had since returned to their home country, and John and Nancy Rappleye, an expatriate American couple from Utah. After his baptism, Bodden held several leadership callings in LDS Church in the Dominican Republic. He was a counselor to the country's first branch president and Bodden was the first district president in the Dominican Republic.

The first mission of the church in the Dominican Republic—the Dominican Republic Santo Domingo Mission—was created in 1981 when there were 2500 members in the country. By 1986, there were 11,000 members and the first stake of the church in the Dominican Republic was organized in Santo Domingo, with Bodden as the country's first stake patriarch. The second mission in the Dominican Republic was organized in Santiago on 1 July 1987.

== Stakes and Districts ==
As of July 2026, Missions in the Dominican Republic had the following stakes and Districts:

Stake	Organized	Mission
Azua DR District	13 Oct 1983	DR Santo Domingo West
Bani DR District	2 Mar 1993	DR Santo Domingo West
Barahona DR District	9 Apr 1991	DR Santo Domingo West
Bonao DR District	1 Nov 2009	DR Santo Domingo North
Cotui DR District	1 Nov 2009	DR Santo Domingo North
Havana Cuba District	18 Jun 2017	DR Santo Domingo East
Holguin Cuba District	25 Jan 2026	DR Santo Domingo East
La Romana DR Stake	11 Dec 2005	DR Santo Domingo East
La Vega DR Stake	21 Jun 1998	DR Santiago
Los Alcarrizos DR Stake	13 Mar 2005	DR Santo Domingo North
Monte Cristi DR District	31 Jan 1995	DR Santiago
Monte Plata DR District	5 Nov 2023	DR Santo Domingo East
Navarrete DR Stake	22 Apr 1986	DR Santiago
Puerto Plata DR Stake	13 Feb 2005	DR Santiago
San Cristóbal DR Stake	25 May 1997	DR Santo Domingo West
San Francisco de Macoris DR Stake	26 May 1991	DR Santo Domingo North
San Juan DR District	11 Feb 1992	DR Santo Domingo West
San Pedro DR District	13 Oct 1983	DR Santo Domingo East
Santiago DR East Stake	21 May 2006	DR Santiago
Santiago DR North Stake	8 Jan 1995	DR Santiago
Santiago DR South Stake	17 Feb 1991	DR Santiago
Santo Domingo DR Central Stake	18 Oct 1992	DR Santo Domingo West
Santo Domingo DR Duarte Stake	9 Jun 2019	DR Santo Domingo North
Santo Domingo DR El Almirante Stake	13 Apr 2008	DR Santo Domingo East
Santo Domingo DR Independencia Stake	18 May 2014	DR Santo Domingo West
Santo Domingo DR Las Americas Stake	13 Apr 2008	DR Santo Domingo East
Santo Domingo DR Las Caobas Stake	2 Nov 2003	DR Santo Domingo West
Santo Domingo DR Los Restauradores Stake	31 Aug 2008	DR Santo Domingo North
Santo Domingo DR Oriental Stake	5 Nov 1989	DR Santo Domingo East
Santo Domingo DR Ozama Stake	2 Feb 1992	DR Santo Domingo East
Santo Domingo DR San Gerónimo Stake	16 Oct 1988	DR Santo Domingo West
Santo Domingo DR Stake	23 Mar 1986	DR Santo Domingo West
Santo Domingo DR Villa Mella Stake	17 Mar 1996	DR Santo Domingo North

== Missions ==
Mission	Organized
Dominican Republic Santiago Mission	1 Jul 1987
Dominican Republic Santo Domingo East Mission	1 Jul 1991
Dominican Republic Santo Domingo North Mission	1 Jul 2024
Dominican Republic Santo Domingo West Mission	1 Jan 1981

=== Cuba ===
The Cuba District is directly administered by the Caribbean Area. It includes all of Cuba with exception of the Guantanamo Bay Naval Base. In 2018, it had 357 members in five congregations. There were three congregations in and around Havana (Cotorro Branch, Havana Branch, and La Portada Branch), one in Holguin (Holguin Branch), and one that serves members and families not in proximity to a meetinghouse (Havana Cuba District Branch). As of 2023, Cuba was administered through the Dominican Republic Santo Domingo East Mission, however no missionaries are assigned to the country. in August 2026, there were 13 branches in two districts, namely:

Havana Cuba District

- Cotorro Branch
- Guanabacoa Branch
- Havana Branch
- Havana Cuba District Branch
- La Portada Branch

Holguin Cuba District

- Buenaventura 1st Branch
- Buenaventura 2nd Branch
- Cabezo Branch
- Dobales Branch
- Guaramanao Branch
- Holguín 1st Branch
- Holguín 2nd Branch
- Tasajera Branch

== Temples ==
Temples in the Dominican Republic
Red = Operating
Blue = Under Construction
Yellow = announced
Black = Closed for Renovations

On 16 November 1993, the LDS Church announced that it would construct a temple in Santo Domingo. On 17 September 2000, church president Gordon B. Hinckley dedicated the Santo Domingo Dominican Republic Temple; it was the church's 99th operating temple and the first temple built in a Caribbean country.

99. Santo Domingo Dominican Republic Temple; Official website; News & images	
Location: Announced: Groundbreaking: Dedicated: Size: Style:	Santo Domingo, Dominican Republic; 16 November 1993 by Gordon B. Hinckley; 18 August 1996 by Richard G. Scott; 17 September 2000 by Gordon B. Hinckley; 67,000 sq ft (6,200 m^{2}) on a 6.42-acre (2.60 ha) site Classic modern, single-spire design - designed by Scott Partnership and Church A&E Services
356. Santiago Dominican Republic Temple (Announced); Official website; News & images	
Location: Announced:	Santiago de los Caballeros; 6 October 2024 by Russell M. Nelson
