= C. Alfred Voegeli =

American bishop

The Right Reverend Charles Alfred Voegeli S.T.D., LL.D.
- Bishop of Haiti
- Church: Episcopal Church
- Diocese: Haiti
- Elected: October 1943
- In office: 1943–1971
- Predecessor: Harry Roberts Carson
- Successor: Luc Garnier

Orders
- Ordination: December 1933 by Benjamin M. Washburn
- Consecration: December 16, 1943 by Henry St. George Tucker

Personal details
- Born: November 23, 1904 Hawthorne, New Jersey, United States
- Died: March 2, 1984 (aged 79) Brooklyn, New York City, New York, United States
- Denomination: Anglican
- Parents: Charles Voegeli & Laure Elisabeth Mauley

Charles Alfred Voegeli (November 23, 1904 - March 2, 1984) was bishop of the Episcopal Diocese of Haiti, serving from 1943 to 1971.

== Early life and education ==
Voegeli was born on November 23, 1904, in Hawthorne, New Jersey. He graduated from Morristown High School in 1922 and later enrolled in a degree in law at the New Jersey Law School in 1925. In 1930 he received a Bachelor of Arts degree from Upsala College. Later he studied theology at the General Theological Seminary and graduated in 1933. He was ordained deacon of May 1933 and priest in December of the same year in St Peter's Church in Morristown, New Jersey.

== Priest ==
After ordination he served as rector of St Andrew's Church in Harrington Park, New Jersey. In 1937 he was also appointed rector of Trinity Church in Woodbridge, New Jersey. In 1938 he was appointed as dean of the Cathedral of St Luke in Ancón, Canal Zone and chaplain of the Bella Vista Children's Home.

== Bishop ==
In October 1943, Voegeli was elected Bishop of Haiti. Voegeli was consecrated Bishop of Haiti with Presiding Bishop Henry St. George Tucker as chief consecrator in St. Peter's Church Morristown, New Jersey, on December 16, 1943. His time as bishop in Haiti was characterized with the growth and expansion of the church in Haiti, especially after gaining government approval in 1947. In 1964 he was forced at gunpoint by armed immigration officers to leave Haiti. He was escorted to the airport and sent on the first flight to Puerto Rico. He continued to administer the diocese from Puerto Rico and later New York. He remained bishop of Haiti until his retirement in 1971. He died on March 2, 1984, due to a heart attack.
