= The Church of Jesus Christ of Latter-day Saints in Alabama =

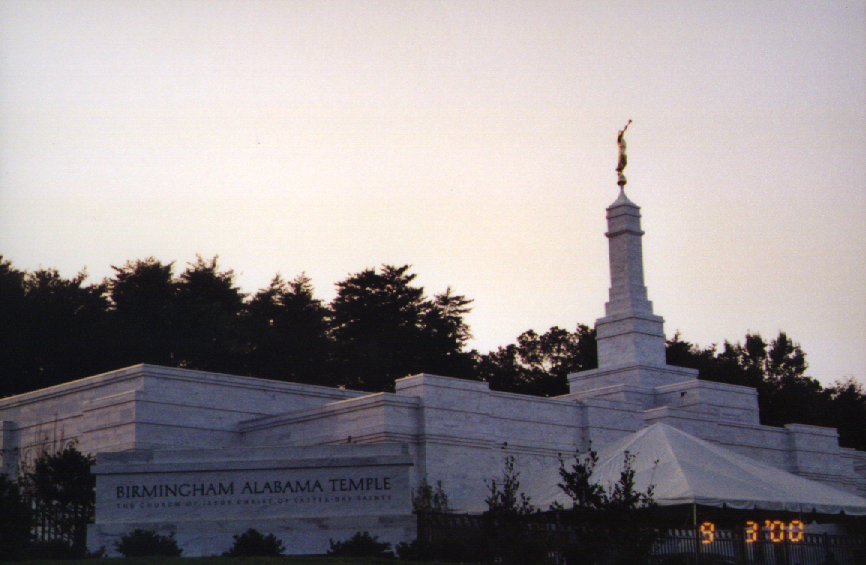
- The Birmingham Alabama Temple
- Area: US Southeast
- Members: 41,252 (2025)
- Stakes: 9
- Wards: 50
- Branches: 20
- Total Congregations: 70
- Missions: 1
- Temples: 1 operating 1 announced 2 total
- FamilySearch Centers: 44

The Church of Jesus Christ of Latter-day Saints in Alabama refers to the Church of Jesus Christ of Latter-day Saints (LDS Church) and its members in Alabama. The first small branch was established in 1842. It has since grown to 41,252 members in 75 congregations.

Official church membership as a percentage of general population was 0.75% in 2014. According to the 2014 Pew Forum on Religion & Public Life survey, 1% of Alabamians identify most closely with The Church of Jesus Christ of Latter-day Saints. The LDS Church is the 10th largest denomination in Alabama.

Stakes are located in Birmingham, Decatur, Dothan, Gadsden, Huntsville, Madison, Mobile, Montgomery, and Tuscaloosa.

== History ==
Membership in Alabama
Year	Members
1844	193
1930	2,516
1974	7,800
1980	14,000
1990	22,000
1995	25,000
2000	27,913
2005	32,339
2010	34,725
2015	36,874
2020	37,765
2025	41,252
Source: Windall J. Ashton; Jim M. Wall, Deseret News, various years, Church Almanac State Information: Alabama

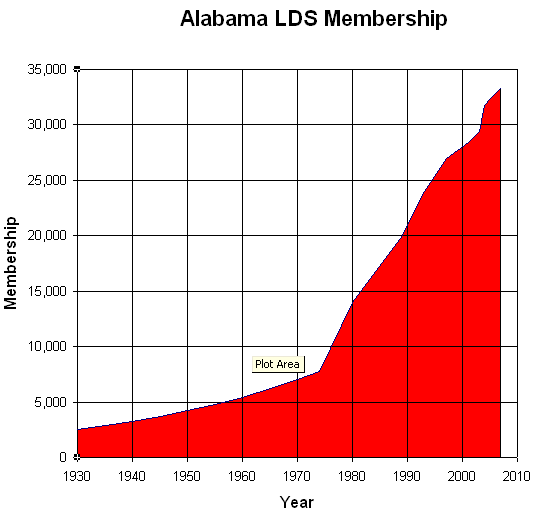
Alabama LDS membership history

Concerted missionary efforts in Alabama started around 1842–1843 in Alabama with the work of Elders James Brown and John U. Eldridge. Before August 24, 1842, branches in Tuscaloosa (the Cybry Branch) and Perry (Bogue-Chitto Branch) counties were organized by Elder Brown. Elder Eldridge baptized his brother, wife, and mother-in-law earlier that year.

Elder John Brown, was among the early missionaries baptized a number a people in Tuscaloosa and Perry Counties including some of the first African-Americans to join the church. Hagar and Jack, two African-American men, joined the Church on October 24, 1843. Many of the early missionaries frequently passed between Alabama and Mississippi in their work.

Most early members immigrated west to join the body of the saint and to avoid persecution. Some of these Alabama members were among the group of "Mississippi Saints" that emigrated under the leadership of John Brown and William Crosby in 1846.

In 1876, missionary work resumed with the creation of the Southern States Mission. Opposition was widespread in the 1880s with some even asking Alabama's governor to force the missionaries from the state. This subsided somewhat by 1894.

A new branch was established in Magnolia, Alabama during the late 1890s. Despite the tarring and feathering of some missionaries to the branch and the attempted arson of an early meeting place, a wood-frame Magnolia Chapel of The Church of Jesus Christ of Latter-day Saints was completed in 1913. Two elders from Utah assisted in the construction, Elder Sellers from Vernal and Elder Joseph E. Ward from Parowan. Although the branch completed a new brick chapel adjacent to the old one in 1972, the historic chapel continues to be used for social occasions. It is the oldest surviving LDS chapel in the state. The Magnolia Branch is currently a member of the Montgomery Stake.

A Sunday School was organized in Montgomery on August 22, 1911. Many of these early converts were baptized in the Alabama River.

By the mid-1930s Sunday School groups existed in Birmingham, Elkmont, Gadsden, McCalla, and Montgomery. In 1937, the Alabama District split in half to create the Alabama and North Alabama Districts. In 1940, the Montgomery Branch staged a pioneer parade that attracted thousands.

The LDS Church began to grow more rapidly in Alabama following World War II. Alabama's first stake was created in Huntsville in 1968.

Following Hurricane Katrina in 2005, several thousand Latter-day Saint volunteers—Helping Hands, from a 7 state areas (including Alabama), went to Louisiana and Mississippi. Many of them taking time out of their jobs or came down on the weekends to help anyone needing assistance.

In September 2008, Latter-day Saints across Alabama went to the Baton Rouge area to aid cleanup efforts following Hurricane Gustav, as well as other disaster cleanup efforts in following years.

On April 27, 2011, an extremely violent and long-tracked EF5 wedge tornado devastated several towns in rural northern Alabama, before tearing through the northern suburbs of Huntsville and causing damage in rural portions of southern Tennessee. With 72 fatalities, it was the deadliest tornado of the 2011 Super Outbreak, the largest tornado outbreak in United States history, and the deadliest tornado in Alabama history. The tornado reached a maximum width of 1.25 miles (2.01 km) and was estimated to have had peak winds of 210 mph (340 km/h). Members of the Tupelo Mississippi Stake volunteered to clean up the area.

Temple and Stakes in Alabama as of January 2024
Red=Operating temple
Blue=Temple under construction
Green=Stake with at least one congregation meeting in Alabama

== Stakes ==
As of September 2026, the following stakes were centered in Alabama:

Stake	Organized	Mission	Temple District
Birmingham Alabama	2 Feb 1975	Alabama Birmingham	Birmingham Alabama
Columbus Georgia (Note: Stake located outside Alabama with congregation(s) meeting in Alabama)	15 Jan 1978	Georgia Atlanta	Atlanta Georgia
Coosa Valley Alabama	22 Sep 2019	Alabama Birmingham	Birmingham Alabama
Dothan Alabama	2 Mar 1986	Florida Tallahassee	Tallahassee Florida
Huntsville Alabama	3 Mar 1968	Alabama Birmingham	Birmingham Alabama
Madison Alabama	30 Oct 2011	Alabama Birmingham	Birmingham Alabama
Mobile Alabama	8 Oct 1978	Alabama Birmingham	Birmingham Alabama
Montgomery Alabama	2 Nov 1975	Alabama Birmingham	Birmingham Alabama
Newnan Georgia	16 Aug 2020	Georgia Atlanta	Atlanta Georgia
Sipsey Alabama	17 May 2026	Alabama Birmingham	Birmingham Alabama
Tupelo Mississippi	9 Jun 1991	Arkansas Little Rock	Memphis Tennessee
Tuscaloosa Alabama	12 Sep 1982	Alabama Birmingham	Birmingham Alabama

== Missions ==
The Alabama Birmingham Mission encompasses Birmingham Alabama, Coosa Valley Alabama, Huntsville Alabama, Madison Alabama, Mobile Alabama, Montgomery Alabama, Sipsey Alabama, and Tuscaloosa Alabama stakes.

== Temples ==
On September 3, 2000, the Birmingham Alabama Temple was dedicated by President Gordon B. Hinckley.

98. Birmingham Alabama Temple; Official website; News & images	
Location: Announced: Groundbreaking: Dedicated: Size: Style:	Gardendale, Alabama, United States; September 11, 1998 by Gordon B. Hinckley; October 9, 1999 by Stephen A. West; September 3, 2000 by Gordon B. Hinckley; 10,700 sq ft (990 m^{2}) on a 5.6-acre (2.3 ha) site Classic modern, single-spire design - designed by Robert Waldrip and Church A&E Services
283. Huntsville Alabama Temple (Under construction); Official website; News & images	
Location: Announced: Groundbreaking: Size:	southeast corner of Gillespie and Browns Ferry Road, Madison, Madison County, Alabama, United States; 6 October 2024 by Russell M. Nelson; 15 August 2026 by John D. Amos; 22,681 sq ft (2,107.1 m^{2}) on a 10.97-acre (4.44 ha) site

== See also ==
- The Church of Jesus Christ of Latter-day Saints membership statistics (United States)
