= Evangelical Baptist Mission of South Haiti =

Religious body in Haiti

- Mission Evangélique Baptiste du Sud d'Haïti
- Abbreviation: MEBSH
- Classification: Evangelical Christianity
- Theology: Baptist
- Associations: Baptist World Alliance
- Headquarters: Les Cayes, Haiti
- Origin: 1936
- Congregations: 488
- Members: 60,000
- Hospitals: 2
- Tertiary institutions: Light University
- Seminaries: 3
- Official website: mebsh.org

The Evangelical Baptist Mission of South Haiti (French: Mission Evangélique Baptiste du Sud d'Haïti) is a Baptist Christian denomination in Haiti, headquartered in Les Cayes. MEBSH is a member of the Protestant Federation of Haiti, the Evangelical Council of Haitian Churches and the Baptist World Alliance.

== History ==
Evangelical Baptist Mission of South Haiti (MEBSH) began with the evangelistic efforts of repatriated Haitians from Cuba in the 1920s. The organization was officially formed in 1936 in Les Cayes when the movement's leaders invited the non-denominational agency World Team (then West Indies Mission) to open a Bible school.

In 1958, the Mission founded Radio Lumière in Les Cayes.

Since 2012 the president of the Evangelical Baptist Mission of South Haiti is Rev. Alnève Emile, who succeeded Rev. Luders Erase for a five-year term. He was re-elected in 2017.

According to a census published by the association in 2023, it claimed 488 churches and 60,000 members.

== Social work ==
The MEBSH operates numerous educational, health and development institutions in Haiti.

=== Schools ===
It has 413 primary schools and secondary schools.

It also has 1 professional training institute.

It has 3 affiliated theological institutes.

In 1993, the Light University was founded by the Mission.

=== Health Services ===
It manages the Lumière Hospital in Bonne Fin and the Lumière Health Center in Les Cayes.

=== Development ===
- Women's domestic training center: Centre Lumière aux Cayes
- Integrated Rural Development
- Well drilling
- Orphanages
- Youth Camp Mahanaim

== See also ==
- Religion in Haiti
- Christianity in Haiti
- Protestantism in Haiti
- Bible
- Born again
- Baptist beliefs
- Jesus Christ
- Believers' Church
