= Birmingham Alabama Temple =

Temple of the LDS church

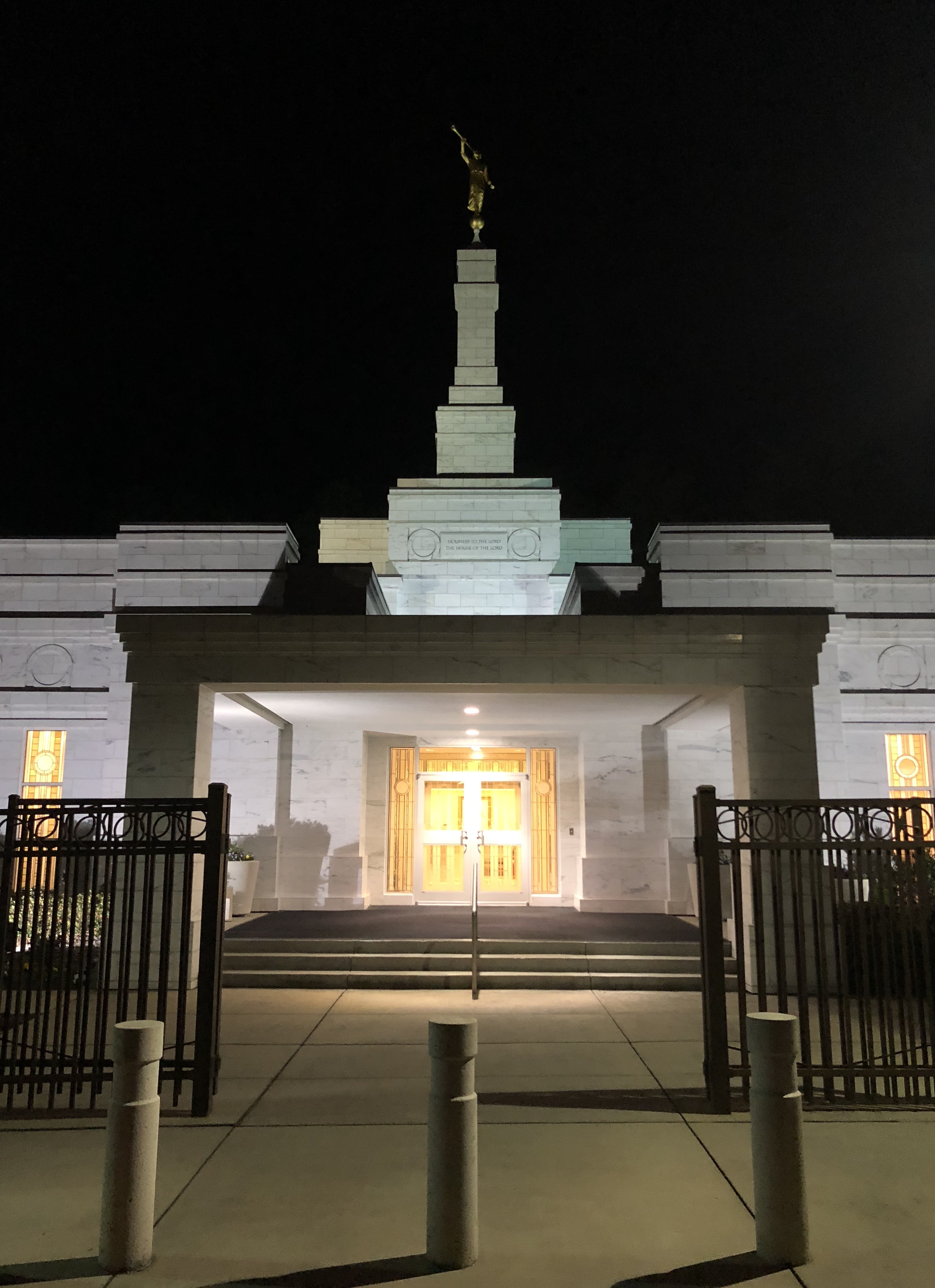
- Interactive map of Birmingham Alabama Temple
- Number: 98
- Dedication: September 3, 2000, by Gordon B. Hinckley
- Site: 5.6 acres (2.3 ha)
- Floor area: 10,700 ft^{2} (990 m^{2})
- Height: 71 ft (22 m)
- Official website • News & images

Church chronology
← Houston Texas Temple	Birmingham Alabama Temple	→ Santo Domingo Dominican Republic Temple

Additional information
- Announced: September 11, 1998, by Gordon B. Hinckley
- Groundbreaking: October 9, 1999, by Stephen A. West
- Open house: August 19–26, 2000
- Current president: Duane D. Tippets
- Designed by: Robert Waldrip and Church A&E Services
- Location: Gardendale, Alabama, United States
- Coordinates: 33°40′27.93359″N 86°49′16.84920″W
- Exterior finish: Imperial Danby White Marble quarried in Vermont
- Design: Classic modern, single-spire design
- Baptistries: 1
- Ordinance rooms: 2 (two-stage progressive)
- Sealing rooms: 2

The Birmingham Alabama Temple is the 98th operating temple of the Church of Jesus Christ of Latter-day Saints and the first in Alabama. Located in the suburb of Gardendale, just north of Birmingham, the temple was announced on September 11, 1998, by the church's First Presidency. A groundbreaking ceremony took place on October 9, 1999, presided over by Stephen A. West, a church general authority, with approximately 2,300 members attending despite inclement weather. After construction was completed, a public open house held from August 19 to 26, 2000, had approximately 21,000 visitors. The temple was dedicated by church president Gordon B. Hinckley on September 3, 2000, in four sessions, with approximately 4,800 attendees.

The temple has a single-story design constructed with Imperial Danby white marble from Vermont. It includes a single spire topped with an angel Moroni statue, two ordinance rooms, two sealing rooms, and a baptistry. The building has a total floor area of 10,700 square feet, and is on a 5.6-acre site, landscaped with mature trees and shrubs, and was recognized with a beautification award from the City of Gardendale in 2008.

== History ==
The intent to construct the temple was announced by the First Presidency on September 11, 1998. In April 1999, the church announced that it would be constructed on a 5.6-acre (2.3 ha) property at 1927 Mount Olive Boulevard in Gardendale, Alabama. The preliminary plans called for a single-story structure of more than 10,700 square feet.

A groundbreaking ceremony occurred on October 9, 1999, marking the commencement of construction. The ceremony was presided over by Stephen A. West and was attended by local church members and community leaders. Following completion of construction, a public open house was held from August 19–26, 2000. During the open house, approximately 21,100 people visited the temple.

The Birmingham Alabama Temple was dedicated on September 3, 2000, by Gordon B. Hinckley.

In 2008, the temple was honored with a beautification award from the City of Gardendale, recognizing its attractive grounds and contribution to the local landscape.

In 2020, like all the church's others, the Birmingham Alabama Temple was closed for a time in response to the COVID-19 pandemic.

== Design and architecture ==
The temple is on a 5.6-acre (2.3 ha) plot in Gardendale, Alabama, a suburb north of Birmingham, on a tree-covered hillside just east of Interstate 65. The landscaped grounds includes trees and shrubs. During the Christmas season, Nativity-themed statues are added to the lawn and illuminated at night. The architect was Robert Waldrip, of Joyce, Prout and Associates, working with the church's architectural department.

It is a single-story structure constructed with Imperial Danby white marble quarried in Vermont. The exterior has a single attached spire topped with an angel Moroni statue. The building is 10,700 square feet (994 m²) and includes two ordinance rooms, two sealing rooms, and one baptistry.

Its design has symbolic elements representing Latter-day Saint beliefs. The angel Moroni statue symbolizes the restoration of the gospel and the preaching of the message of salvation to the world. Symbols provide deeper spiritual meaning to the temple's appearance and function.

== Temple presidents ==
The church's temples are directed by a temple president and matron, each typically serving for a term of three years. The president and matron oversee the administration of temple operations and provide guidance and training for both temple patrons and staff.

Serving from 2000 to 2004, Elijah A. Rich was the first president, with Sandra L. Rich serving as matron. As of 2025, Duane D. Tippets is the president, with Lori Tippets serving as matron.

== Admittance ==
After construction was completed, a public open house was held from August 19 to August 26, excluding Sundays. The temple was dedicated by Gordon B. Hinckley on September 3, 2000, in four sessions.

Like all the church's temples, it is not used for Sunday worship services. To members of the church, temples are regarded as sacred houses of the Lord. Once dedicated, only church members with a current temple recommend can enter for worship.

== See also ==
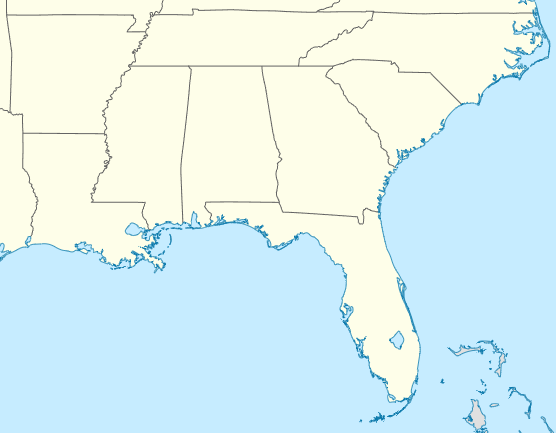
Temples in the Southeastern United States
- = Operating
- = Under construction
- = Announced
- = Temporarily Closed
- Comparison of temples of The Church of Jesus Christ of Latter-day Saints
- List of temples of The Church of Jesus Christ of Latter-day Saints
- List of temples of The Church of Jesus Christ of Latter-day Saints by geographic region
- Temple architecture (Latter-day Saints)
- The Church of Jesus Christ of Latter-day Saints in Alabama

== Additional reading ==
- "5 new temples in U.S., Mexico announced", Church News, October 24, 1998, archived from the original on June 20, 2019
- "Ground broken for temple in Alabama", Church News, October 16, 1999
- "Dedication dates announced for temples in Mexico, U.S.", Church News, May 20, 2000
- Dockstader, Julie A. (September 9, 2000), "'God is smiling down on us'", Church News
- "Birmingham Alabama: 'May the Church grow and prosper here'", Church News, September 9, 2000
- "Facts and figures: Birmingham Alabama Temple", Church News, September 9, 2000
