= Episcopal Diocese of Haiti =

Diocese of the Episcopal Church in Haiti

Coordinates: 19°N 72°W

Diocese of Haiti Dioecesis Haitiensis Dyosèz Ayiti Diocèse d'Haïti

Location
- Country: Haiti
- Territory: Haiti
- Ecclesiastical province: Province II

Statistics
- Congregations: 120
- Members: 98,403 (2023)

Information
- Denomination: Episcopal Church
- Established: 1861
- Cathedral: Holy Trinity Cathedral
- Language: Haitian Creole, French

Current leadership
- Bishop: Jean-Zaché Duracin
- Suffragan: Ogé Beauvoir

Map
- The diocese encompasses the entire country of Haiti.

Website
- www.egliseepiscopaledhaiti.org

The Episcopal Diocese of Haiti (Haitian Creole: Legliz Episkopal Ayiti or Dyosèz Ayiti French: Eglise Episcopale d'Haïti or Diocèse d'Haïti) is the Anglican Communion diocese consisting of the entire territory of Haiti. It is part of Province 2 of the Episcopal Church in the United States of America. Its cathedral, Holy Trinity located in the corner of Ave. Mgr. Guilloux & Rue Pavée in downtown Port-au-Prince, has been destroyed six times, including in the 2010 Haiti earthquake.

It is the largest diocese in the Episcopal Church, with 98,403 active baptized members reported in 2023. In 2024, the diocese reported average Sunday attendance (ASA) of 15,883 persons, but no report for 2025.

In 2023, Jean-Zaché Duracin is the current bishop of Haiti. The Reverend Canon Ogé Beauvoir became the first bishop suffragan of Haiti in 2012.

== History ==
Holy Trinity parish was established in Port-au-Prince on Pentecost, May 25, 1863 by James Theodore Holly. The first church was set on fire by Sylvain Salnave in 1866; possibly the second, and definitely the third, were destroyed by fire in 1873; yet another by fire on July 4, 1888; and a fifth by fire on July 5, 1908. Construction of the sixth Holy Trinity began in 1924.

In 1864, the first Diocesan Synod was held. Then known as the Haitian Apostolic Orthodox Church, it was recognized as a member of the Anglican Communion in 1870. The Diocese of Haiti formally joined The Episcopal Church of the United States on May 15, 1875. Nearly a century later, Luc Garnier was elected as the first Haitian-born bishop of the diocese.

== 21st century ==
=== 2010 earthquake ===
The 2010 Haiti earthquake destroyed much of the infrastructure of the diocese, including Holy Trinity Cathedral and its school, the diocesan offices, the Couvent Sainte Marguerite, the College Saint Pierre, at least four of the diocese's more than 200 schools, and the home of Duracin and his injured wife.

Duracin and the church leadership set up a camp in Port-au-Prince "the size of a football field" where destitute and injured Haitians could seek refuge. Episcopal Relief and Development began working with the Episcopal Diocese of the Dominican Republic to help with Haitians who cross the border, and with IMA World Health to medical help to the wounded around Port-au-Prince. Prior to the earthquake the Episcopal Diocese of Haiti's Development Office had trained a network of 28 community development workers for disaster management. Since the quake, these development agents completed initial needs assessments for their own communities. Two weeks after the quake the Episcopal Diocese of Haiti and Episcopal Relief & Development were helping over 25,000 survivors in 23 camps. Many of the camps are located at the sites of Episcopal churches and schools and range in size from a few hundred people to approximately 8000. Six of the camps inhabited by more than 15,000 survivors were not accessible by vehicles and were supplied by helicopter. Sanitation and clean water facilities were constructed for many of the camps.

=== The 2020s ===
A further earthquake in 2021 killed approximately 2000 people and demolished many church buildings.

Bishop Jean Zaché Duracin retired in 2019, and by the end of 2022, a new bishop had not yet been agreed on. In 2022, several diocesan officials were arrested for arms trafficking; this includes two presidents of the standing committee which was overseeing the diocese.

In 2023, the Diocese included 250 schools, some hospitals and the Université Episcopale d’Haiti.

== Bishops ==
1. James Theodore Holly (1874–1911)
2. Harry Roberts Carson (1923–43)
  * Spence Burton (Suffragan) (1939–1942)
3. C. Alfred Voegeli (1943–1971)
4. Luc Garnier (1971–1993)
5. Jean-Zaché Duracin (1994–2019)
  * Ogé Beauvoir (2012–2019) (Suffragan)

== See also ==
- Religion in Haiti
- Christianity in Haiti
- Protestantism in Haiti
