= Laënnec Hurbon =

Haitian sociologist of religion

- Born: 1940 (age 85–86); Jacmel, Haiti
- Education: Institut Catholique de Paris, Sorbonne University
- Occupation: Sociologist of religion
- Notable work: Voodoo: Truth and Fantasy

Laënnec Hurbon (sometimes anglicised as Laennec Hurbon; born 1940) is a Haitian sociologist and writer specialising in the relationships between religion, culture and politics in the Caribbean region. He is also a Catholic theologian and ex-priest turned researcher and writer.

== Career ==
Hurbon was born in Jacmel, a commune in southern Haiti. He is Doctor of Theology (Institut Catholique de Paris) and Sociology (Sorbonne University), director of research at CNRS and professor at the Quisqueya University in Port-au-Prince, of which he is one of the founding members. Today he focuses on the relationships between religion, culture and politics in the Caribbean region and has written many books on Haitian Vodou.

His notable publications are the Dieu dans le Vaudou haïtien (1972) and Le Barbare imaginaire (1987), which have been described as "two classics" of the author; and the "small 'big book'" – Les mystères du vaudou (1993; US ed. – Voodoo: Search for the Spirit), which is a heavily illustrated pocket book from Éditions Gallimard's "Découvertes" collection. He also edited a collective work entitled Catastrophes et environnement : Haïti, séisme du 12 janvier 2010 (2014).

== Publications ==
=== Publications by Hurbon ===
- Dieu dans le Vaudou haïtien. Éditions Payot, 1972
- Culture et dictature en Haïti : l'imaginaire sous contrôle. L'Harmattan, 1979
- Le Barbare imaginaire. Éditions Henri Deschamps, 1987
- Comprendre Haïti : Essai sur l'État, la nation, la culture. Karthala, 1987
- Le phénomène religieux dans la Caraïbe. Karthala, 1989
- Les mystères du vaudou. Collection "Découvertes Gallimard" (nº 190). série Religions. Éditions Gallimard, 1993
  - Voodoo: Truth and Fantasy, 'New Horizons' series. Thames & Hudson, 1995. UK edition
  - Voodoo: Search for the Spirit, "Abrams Discoveries" series. Harry N. Abrams, 1995. U.S. edition

=== Publication edited by Hurbon ===
- Catastrophes et environnement : Haïti, séisme du 12 janvier 2010. Éditions de l'EHESS, 2014. Various authors.

=== Interviews with Hurbon ===
- A crise do Haiti é reflexo da corrupção com endosso internacional. Entrevista especial com Laënnec Hurbon 2019.
