= Christianity in Haiti =

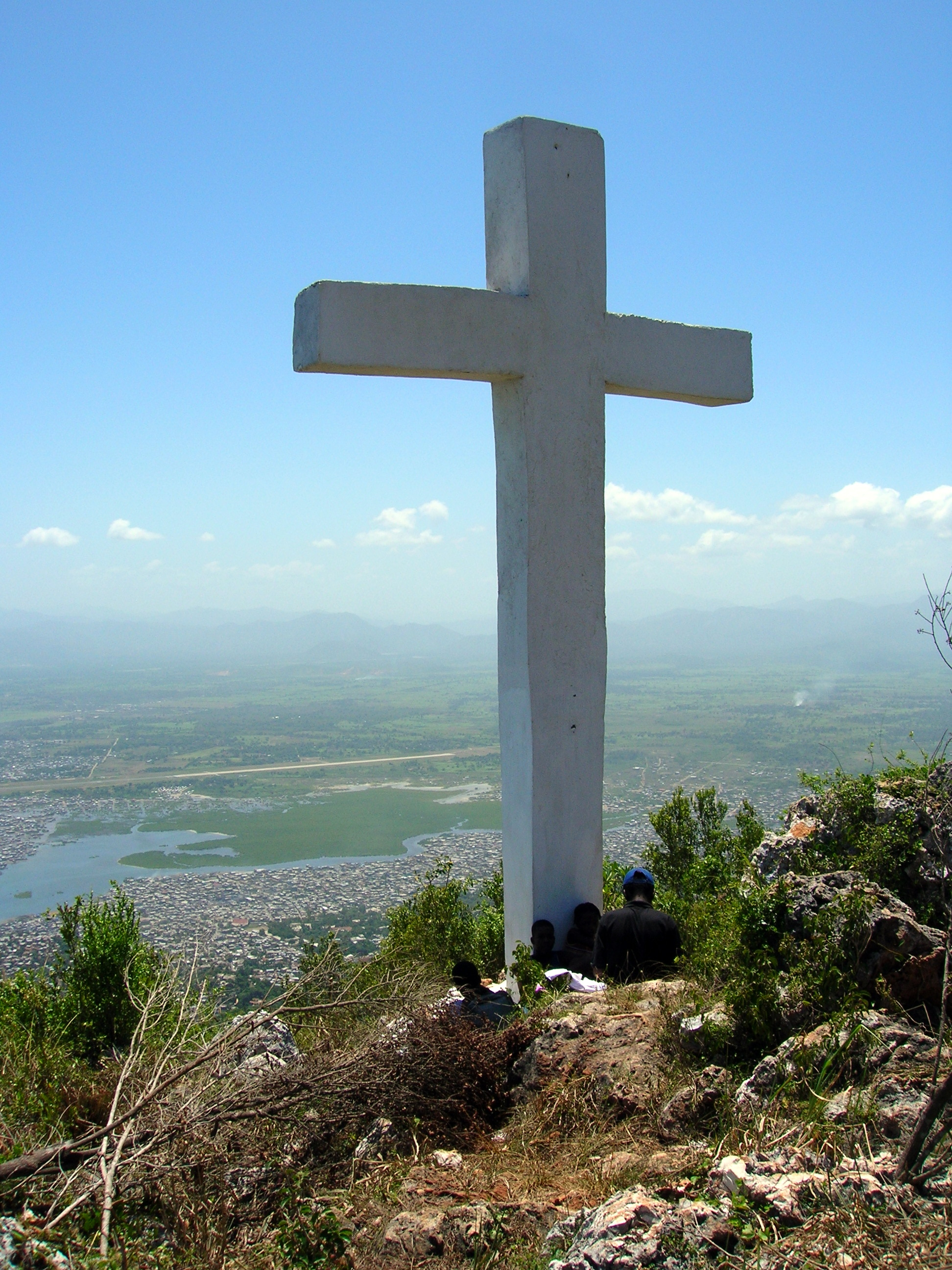
A cross on Morne Jean

Haiti is a majority Christian country. Figures in 2020 suggest that 93% of the population belong to a Christian denomination.

Haiti saw the introduction of Christianity when Europeans arrived to colonize the island. It was first introduced by the Spanish, later followed by French colonialists. The primary brand of Christianity was Catholicism. In recent years, some Protestant denominations have made an increased number of converts in Haiti, continuing early work done by a small number of Protestant missions since the independence of the island.

== Overview ==
Haiti was first colonized by the Spanish, who later abandoned the island's western portion. That region came under French influence after 1630, and was formally recognized as the French colony of Saint-Domingue in 1697. Under French rule, Roman Catholicism was the sole legal religion, though African slaves frequently practiced vodou. Slaves revolted in 1791 and established the first black republic in 1804. Three years later Protestant missionary activity begun. Political control of the island shifted frequently during the 19th century with different European governments, the Dominican Republic, Columbia and Haiti itself alternating in power.

=== Ecumenical relations ===
Protestant churches and sects have frequently attempted to so-ordinate their activities through organisations like the Council Churches in Haiti and the Protestant Federation. The Roman Catholic Church later participated in the Ecumenical Research group of 1968. The practice of vodou is strong in Haiti and some vodou practitioners advocate being included in any ecumenical gatherings.

== History of the development of Christianity in Haiti ==
The Spanish first brought Catholicism to the island. The first European to set foot on Haiti, Christopher Columbus landed on December 6, 1492, by way of San Salvador, with three ships. His own ship, the Santa Maria ran aground near Mole St. Nicolas on the northwest of the island. Some evangelization efforts were extended to the natives, though this population was soon nearly wiped out through disease and slavery. African slaves, brought to work in their place, were introduced to Christianity.

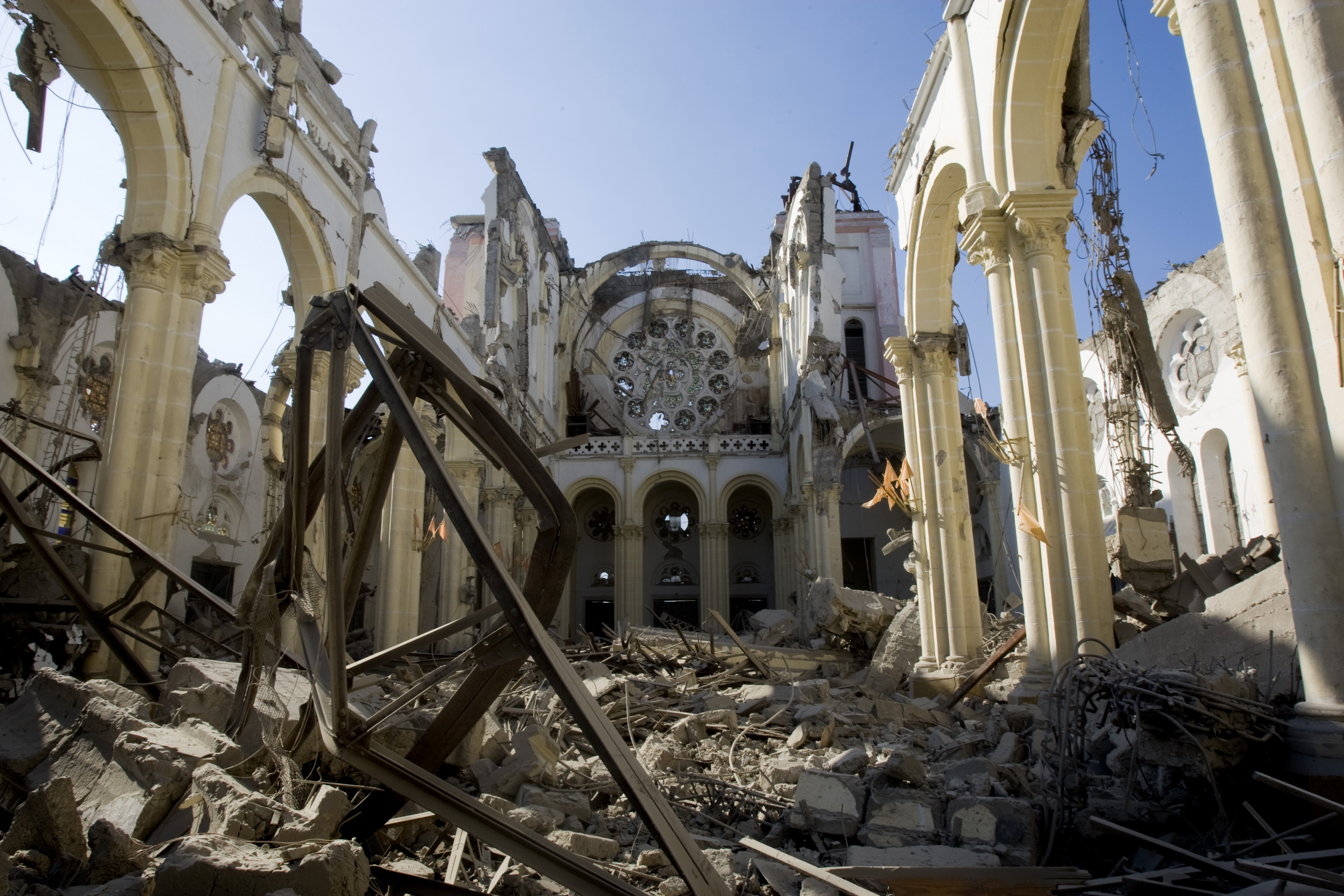
Remnants of the Cathedral of Our Lady of the Assumption after its collapse during the 2010 Haiti earthquake. In 2020, the building is still in ruins.

During Spanish rule, religion was one of the most important aspects of life on the island. Catholic missionaries traveled inland to Christianize most of the island inhabitants. In 1511, three bishoprics formed and the inhabitants appeared enthusiastic. However, missionary work among such impoverished people on a tropical island was challenging. Diseases such as 'yellow fever' and malaria killed many missionaries and their converts.

Under French rule, Capuchins and Jesuits did most of the missionary work in the 18th century. From 1804, when independence was declared, until 1860, the country was in schism. Relations were regularized by a concordat concluded in 1860, when an archdiocese and four dioceses were established. Most of the population of Haiti adheres to the Catholic faith, though some combine this with elements of vodou.

Protestantism was introduced to the newly independent nation in 1807, and missionary efforts have been ongoing. Today, Protestants make up at least one-sixth of the population and as much as one-third.

== Christian festivals in Haiti ==
Rara is the yearly festival in Haiti that the peasants and urban poor celebrate. On the eve of Lent, Rara processions build for six weeks until Easter week starts. Processions include walking for miles through local territory, performing new and traditional songs, and attracting fans. The belief in this celebration is that they are conducting the spiritual work that becomes necessary when the angels and saints along with Jesus, disappear into the Underworld on Good Friday.

=== First broadcast of church radio in Haiti ===
Protestantism was the first denomination allowing broadcast programs in 1950, for up to three hours from Monday to Saturday. The first broadcast was done in the backroom of a church. The two programs were Radio 4VEH and Radio Lumiere. The first test transmission was given in Haiti. The transmission emitted a message stating "4VEH, you are coming in clear and strong". It was the first transmission for the radio 4VEH. Later, the Christian radio station became known worldwide to people, and then the first transmission in Spanish from this station was announced in the year of 1952. Following that, they started doing the broadcasts in other different languages such as French, English etc. In 1978, a Catholic station, Radio Soleil, began functioning. Today there are music and programmes in French and English for 17 hours a day.

== Catholic Church in Haiti ==
According to the 2017 Haitian Government Survey (2017), Catholics made up 52% of the population. Independent figures in 2020 put this at 65.9%.

In 2020, there were over 1,200 and almost 2,000 nuns serving 554 parishes in the country.

== Protestantism in Haiti ==
Protestants in Haiti are a significant minority of the population. The 2015 CIA Factbook reports that around 16% of the population is Protestant (Baptist 10%, Pentecostal 4%, Adventist 1%, other 1%). A Haitian Government survey in 2017 noted that 52% of the population are Protestant. Figures from 2020 suggest that this is now at 19%.

Protestant churches of significant size include the Assemblées de Dieu, the Convention Baptiste d'Haïti, the Seventh-day Adventists, the Church of God (Cleveland), the Church of the Nazarene and the Mission Evangelique Baptiste du Sud-Haiti.

Whereas a very small amount of Catholic Haitians combine their faith with aspects of Vodou, this practice is much more rare among Haitian Protestants, whose churches tend to strongly denounce Vodou as diabolical.

== Orthodoxy in Haiti ==
Since the 1990's there has been an Orthodox mission in Haiti. It was originally founded by Fr. Gregory Williams of the Russian Orthodox Church Outside of Russia but has been since been under the administration of the Greek Orthodox Archdiocese of America. As of 2023, it operates three parishes and three schools with about 800 students enrolled.

== See also ==
- Religion in Haiti
- Christianity and Vodou
