= Light University =

Private university at Port-au-Prince, Haiti

- Université Lumière
- Type: Private
- Established: 1993; 33 years ago
- Affiliations: Evangelical Baptist Mission of South Haiti
- Location: Port-au-Prince, Haiti
- Campus: Urban
- Website: www.ulum.edu.ht

Light University (French: Université Lumière) is a private Baptist university located at Port-au-Prince, Haiti. It is affiliated with the Evangelical Baptist Mission of South Haiti.

== History ==
The university was founded in 1993 in Les Cayes by the Evangelical Baptist Mission of South Haiti. In 2018, it had 37 faculties in 8 cities across the country.
