= Nawoon Marcellus =

Haitian politician

Nawoon Marcellus was an elected official of the Chamber of Deputies of Haïti from 2001 until 2004. The first Muslim to hold the position in Haïti, he was formerly affiliated with the Lavalas Family political party of ex-President Jean-Bertrand Aristide.

Marcellus has since been elected to the Senate from the Reseau National Bouclier party in the Nord Department.

== Career ==
In its 2004 Country Reports on Human Rights Practices, the Bureau of Democracy, Human Rights, and Labor of the U.S. Department of State alleged that on "February 27, pro-government gangs and partisans of former Lavalas Deputy Nawoon Marcellus burned the Northern branch of Radio Vision 2000 in Cap Haitian and sabotaged its Port-au-Prince branch."
