= Radio Lumière =

Port-au-Prince, Haiti; Haiti
- Frequency: 97.7 MHz

Programming
- Languages: Haitian Creole, French

Links
- Website: radiolumiere.org

Radio Lumière is an Evangelical Christian radio network in Haiti. The headquarters is located in Port-au-Prince.

== History ==
Radio Lumière was founded in December 1958 by Evangelical Baptist Mission of South Haiti in Les Cayes. It was officially launched in February 1959.

== See also ==
- Media of Haiti
