= Protestantism in Haiti =

Protestants in Haiti are a significant minority of the population.

Protestantism was officially recognised in the country in 1985.

== Demographics ==
The CIA Factbook reported that approximately 28.5% of the population is Protestant (Baptist 15.4%, Pentecostal 7.9%, Adventist 3%, Methodist 1.5% other 0.7%).

A Haitian Government survey in 2017 noted that 35% of the population are Protestant. Figures from 2020 suggest that this is now at 19%.

== Denominations ==
Protestant churches of significant size include the Assemblées de Dieu, the Convention Baptiste d'Haïti, the Seventh-day Adventists, the Church of God (Cleveland), the Anglican/Episcopal Church, the Methodist Church in the Caribbean and Americas, the Church of the Nazarene and the Mission Evangelique Baptiste du Sud-Haiti.

In 2022, about 60% of Protestant churches in the country are part of the Federation Protestante d'Haiti; this group include Methodists, Lutherans, Presbyterians, Pentecostals, the Salvation Army and others.

Whereas some Catholic Haitians combine their faith with aspects of Vodou, this practice is much more rare among Haitian Protestants, whose churches tend to strongly denounce Vodou as diabolical.

== See also ==
- Religion in Haiti
- Christianity in Haiti
- Catholic Church in Haiti

== Sources ==
- Protestants by country
- Haiti § Demographics
- World Christian Encyclopedia, 2001 edition, Volume 1, page 342
