= Christianity and Vodou =

Syncretic religious relationship

Christian-Vodou can be seen as a syncretism of different cultures and religions. Primarily focused on Haitian Vodou and Catholic Christianity, the two have been merging in a way since around the 18th century, when a majority of Haiti was part of the Atlantic slave trade.

== Roman Catholicism ==
Roman Catholicism is one of the three main existing divisions in Christianity. It revolves around the belief of a single God who is believed to exist in three persons, known as the Holy Trinity. This Holy Trinity is made up of the Father, the Son, and the Holy Spirit. The Catholic community is led by the pope and the Holy See which act similarly as a government of the religion. They determine what fits the standards, morals, and religious views of the community. The Roman Catholic religion believes itself to be derived historically from the teachings of Jesus Christ through his Apostles. Some of their basics beliefs and practices are following the sacraments, such as baptizing a child after birth, praying before a meal, praying the Rosary, etc. In Haitian history, it made its appearance in the 15th century, when Christopher Columbus set foot on the island of Hispaniola.

== Haitian Vodou ==
Haitian culture has a variety of religions and spirituality within itself, but one of the greatest combination of practices within itself has been the syncretism of Catholicism and African religious practices. The creation of Vodou was not a positive one created out of hope and optimism, but instead out of anguish and survival. During the 18th century, when slavery was at its peak, enslaved Africans were trapped in an endless cycle of despair. Due to this, Vodou came to light as a rebellion against the religion of the slavers, which eventually would lead to a slave revolt in 1791. According to Digital Chicago History, the importance of Vodou itself began with the Haitian Revolution which was sparked by a Vodou ceremony known as the Bois Caiman Ceremony.

== The merging of both worlds ==
Roman Catholicism had been around since the first century, but was not known in Haiti until around the 15th century. During the 15th century, Christopher Columbus landed around San Salvador, where some of his people were left to proclaim their religious efforts; but unfortunately were obliterated by illness and others by slavery. Through the African Slave Trade, a large quantity of slaves were brought to the island of San Salvador to continue the labor of the past people associated with Christopher Columbus. Through this trade, many slaves were introduced to Christianity. In 1493, the Spanish colonization of the Americas, also known as Spanish rule, began spreading their religious beliefs on the island. The main religion was Catholicism, so the majority of the island of San Salvador would practice Catholicism. This eventually spread throughout time and with slaves that were traded over the years. It wasn't until 1697 where the French colonized a Western portion of the island of Hispaniola, where San Dominguez was included, now known as Haiti, that the Catholic religion was declared official to the island. Although the Catholic religion remained the official religion of Haiti, Haitian slaves especially began to incorporate their own cultural and spiritual practices into the Catholic religion. Under several laws established around 1685, Catholic practices amongst African slaves (such as baptism and teachings of doctrines) were enforced. Due to risks of practicing their own beliefs, Haitian slaves began to practice their own beliefs under the cover of the Catholic ones. These practices were derived from their religion, known as Vodou. They would practice small changes such place their own saint's identities under the similar saints found in the Catholic religion. Haitian believe in Lwa/loa/loi which are recognized as spirits in Haitian Vodou. They would similarity compare their spirits to the Catholic saint's characteristics and attributes. Even though Christianity was constantly being forced onto Haitian people, Vodou continued to grow beneath Christian practices/symbolism.

== Christian and Vodou conflicts ==
The revolutionary Jean-Jacques Dessalines presumptively proclaimed himself head of the church in Haiti after the Haitian Revolution. He set forward to limit the jurisdiction of priests and to appoint men to vacant positions in local church communities. He himself had caused the assassination of a large number of the missionaries by failing to stop slaughter of the white colonists. This caused a schism between the Haitian state and Rome, resulting in Rome's declining to send priests into the country. There were no priests to provide guidelines for the newly established Haitian state. As a consequence, the principles of Vodou and Catholicism were merged and Catholicism (with its Vodou influences) was made the state's official religion under the leadership of Henri Christophe.

Another cause of the syncretic connection between Catholicism and Vodou was the state's ordination of Haitian men to the priesthood – a step that the Vatican would not recognize as legitimate. However, mixture of both religions shaped the way of how Haitians practice their ritual. The Haitians were going to church, but they continued to adhere to Vodou, using the rituals of the church to mask the practices of their native traditions.

There have been several killings in the past of Christian pastors, and some Christians blame those murders on the influence of Vodou. There have also been several murders of Vodou Priests/Priestesses, most recently after the earthquake. In Haiti, some Christians consider Vodou a form of devil worship. In spite of this criticism by some Haitian Christians, many practitioners of Haitian Vodou continue to self-identify as Roman Catholic, even to the point of incorporating the Lord's Prayer and the Hail Mary into their services for the Lwa (also called loa). These people see no contradiction between the two faiths and, in fact, view it as enriching their own faith, such people refer to themselves as good Christians.

The Christian population of Haiti often uses Vodou as a scapegoat for Haiti's problems including the devastating 2010 earthquake and the poor economic state of Haiti today. Extremist Christian groups in Haiti have sought to rid the country of Vodou completely as they believe Vodou practitioners are influenced by demonic forces. Some Christians deem the earthquake a punishment, because they believe that the portion of Haiti who practice Vodou made a deal with the devil.

== Syncretism ==
At this point, the exact number of Vodou followers and Christians in Haiti is unknown. Many Christians accept Vodou as part of the country's culture, though most Evangelical Christians consider Vodou incompatible with Christianity, though not universally.

Vodou is an established religion. False representations in the media have led it to be considered "black magic," but its adherents recognize it as an official religion. (Or at least not primarily, see bokor.) Many observances are shared between the religions; for instance it is not abnormal for Vodou funerary ceremonies to be performed, followed by a Roman Catholic ceremony presided by a priest. Many Haitians celebrate Christian holidays alongside traditional Vodou holidays. As a whole it is a complex relationship where some consider the theologies to be incompatible, whereas others indeed view them as compatible.

Vodou draws influences from a multitude of other religions and cultures, particularly Catholicism despite the counter-position between the two religions. Over the centuries, Vodou was shaped into the wide-reaching and unique religion that it is today.

Some practices of Haitian Vodou are a result of the syncretism that occurred when the French colonizers forcibly converted West African slaves in the West Indies colonies to Christianity. Instead of completely converting to Christianity, the African slaves disguised their loa as acceptable Catholic saints. This way, they were able to continue to practice their traditional religion. This new form of the tribal African religions came to be Haitian Vodou which to this day still has its Christian influences. Despite the constant opposition between Christianity and Vodou, many Haitians often consider themselves practitioners of both Vodou and Christianity.

Louisiana Vodou/New Orleans Vodou is another example of syncretism with Christianity and West African culture.

== The Church position ==
During the colonial period, the Catholic Church first altered the traditional African traditions that would eventually become Haitian Vodou through slavery and forced Christianization. Missionaries sought to end any African influence on slaves in the New World to fully convert them to Christianity. The Church has put pressure upon the government to outlaw and disband Vodou. In 1896, 1913, and again in 1941 the church led its anti-superstitious campaigns to fight against Vodou. During the campaigns, hundreds of Ounfos and ritual paraphernalia were destroyed and burned. In addition to the more common French and British missionaries, Canadian missionaries began to move into Haiti in 1942. A Jesuit seminary was also opened in 1948. Up to this time, the church remains a major political power; this can cause major problems in country and has greatly limited its pastoral work. In the past decade the Catholic Church has taken a much more liberal stand towards Vodou, even including some minor Vodou elements in the Haitian mass.

== See also ==
- Haitian Vodou
- Louisiana Voodoo
