= Holy Trinity Cathedral, Port-au-Prince =

Main Episcopal cathedral in Haiti until 2010

Coordinates: 18°32′48″N 72°20′19″W

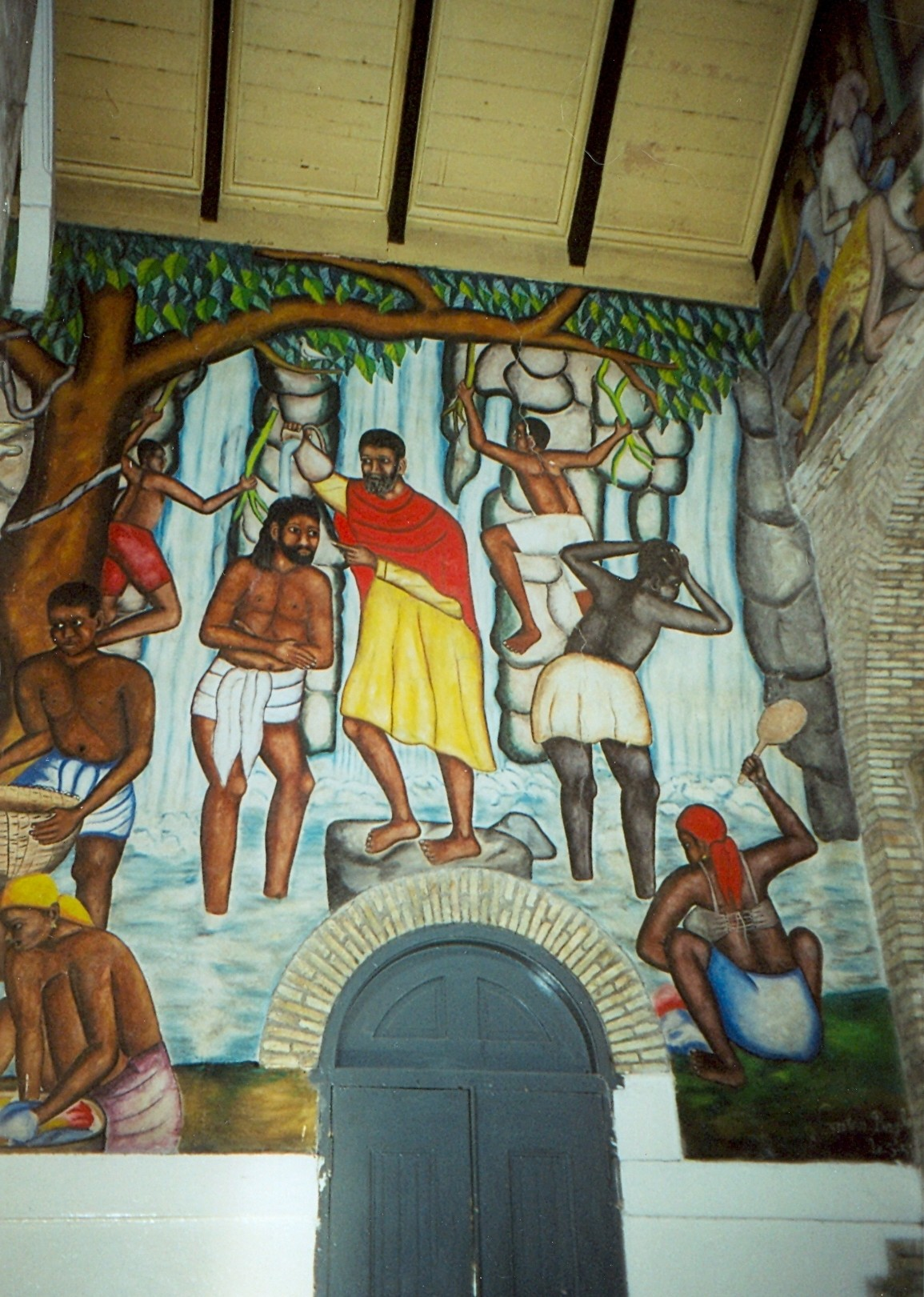
A mural inside the cathedral depicting the baptism of Jesus (2002)

The Holy Trinity Cathedral (French: Cathédrale Sainte Trinité) was the main cathedral of the Episcopal Diocese of Haiti, located in the nation's capital Port-au-Prince. It was known for its fourteen interior murals that depicted Black people in various Biblical stories. The murals were created by several prominent Haitian painters of the 20th century, and they received artistic direction from the Haitian Center of Art.

The cathedral was destroyed in the 2010 Haiti earthquake, with only three murals surviving the damage. As of 2017, efforts by the Episcopal Diocese of Haiti and organizations in the United States to rebuild the cathedral remain in their planning stage.

== Murals ==
The Holy Trinity Cathedral was known for its fourteen interior murals, which featured various stories from the Bible and depicted its characters as Black. The murals were painted by some of the best-known Haitian painters of the 20th century, including Philomé Obin, Castera Bazile, Rigaud Benoit, Gabriel Leveque, Adam Leontus, Wilson Bigaud, Jasmin Joseph, and Préfete Dufaut. They were created under the direction of DeWitt Peters and Selden Rodman of the Haitian Center of Art, and finished between 1950 and 1951.

== 2010 earthquake and reconstruction plans ==
The Holy Trinity Cathedral was heavily damaged in the earthquake that hit Haiti on 12 January 2010, and the building was later razed to the ground. Only three of the cathedral's fourteen murals remained intact after the earthquake. The cathedral's organ, which was believed to be one of the largest in the Caribbean, was destroyed by collapsing debris in the earthquake.

The Episcopal Diocese of Haiti has coordinated with multiple organizations in the United States, including the Episcopal Church and the Smithsonian Institution, to plan the reconstruction of the cathedral. In December 2012, following a year-long consultation process, the Episcopal Diocese of Haiti and the Episcopal Church selected Kerns Group Architects, based in Arlington County, Virginia, to rebuild the cathedral. As of 2017, however, construction had yet to begin, with the Episcopal Diocese of Haiti and the Episcopal Church only reaching a memorandum of understanding in the previous year to commit to the cathedral's restoration.
