= Religion in Haiti =

Religion in Haiti (Pew Research Center 2020)
1. Christianity (88.7%)
2. Unaffiliated (9.40%)
3. Other religions (1.90%)

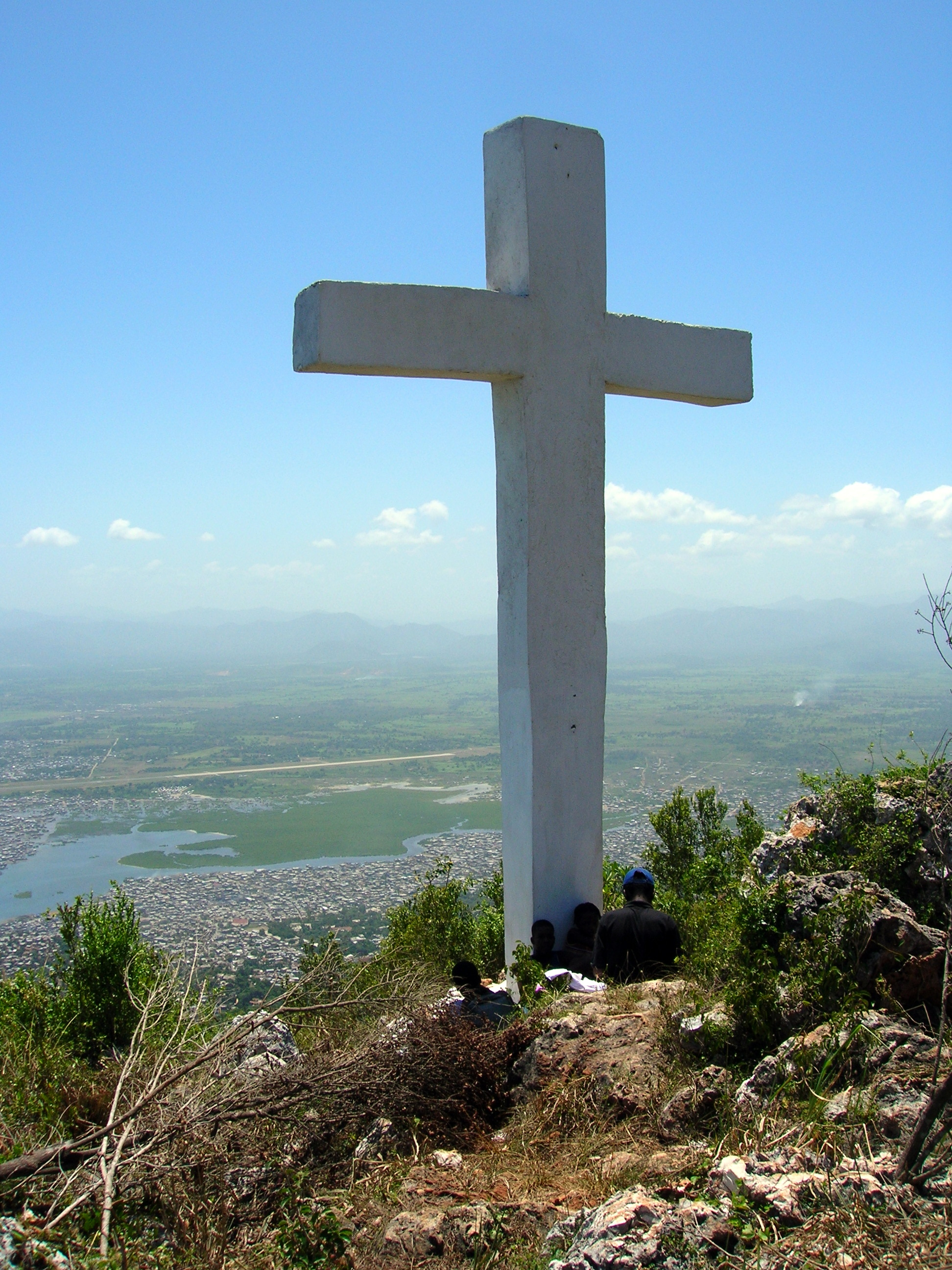
A cross on Morne Jean

Haiti is a majority Christian country. For much of its history and up to the present day, Haiti has been prevailingly a Christian country, primarily Catholic, although in practice often profoundly modified and influenced through syncretism. A common syncretic religion is Vodou, which combined the Yoruba religion of enslaved Africans with Catholicism and some Native American strands; it shows similarities, and shares many deity-saints, with Cuban Santería and Brazilian Candomblé. The constitution of Haiti establishes the freedom of religion and does not establish a state religion, although the Catholic Church receives some preferential treatment.

Those identifying with the Catholic Church make up the largest single Christian group in the country, they are variously estimated to be about 55 percent of the population according to the 2018 CIA World Factbook, and 57 percent according to the Pew Research Center. The Catholic presence traces back to the French colonial empire, which included the island.

Protestantism has grown in recent years and Protestants have been estimated by the CIA World Factbook to form 28.5% of the population, while the Pew Research Center estimates their share to be nearly 28 percent. A 2024 survey by Policite found that 37% of citizens identified as Protestant and 29% identified as Catholic.

== Christianity ==
=== Catholicism ===
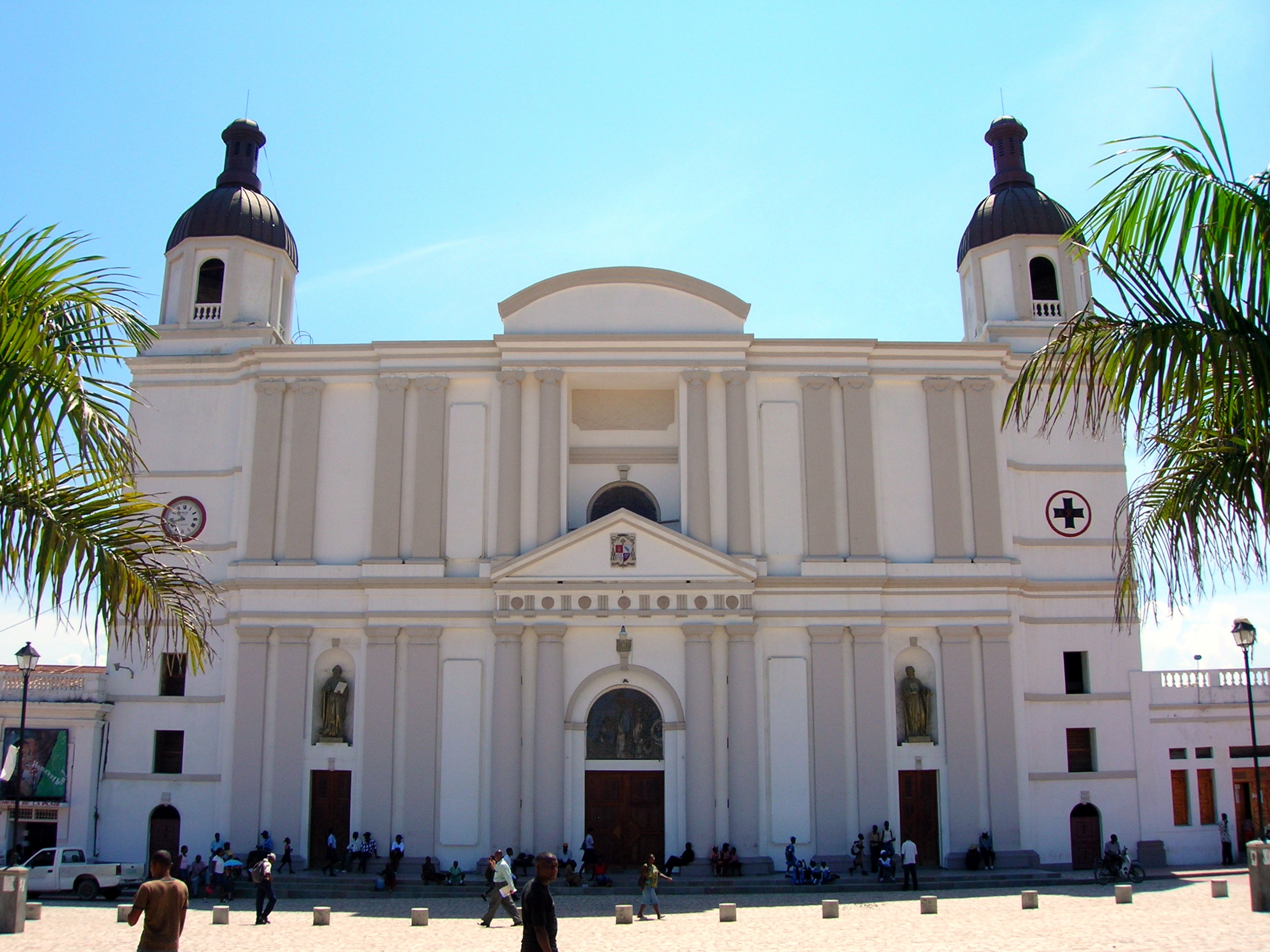
Cathedral of Our Lady of the Assumption in Cap-Haïtien

The predominant denomination is Catholicism. Similar to the rest of Latin America, Saint-Domingue was built up by Catholic European powers such as the Spanish and the French. Following in this legacy, Catholicism was in the Haitian constitution as its official state religion until 1987. According to recent estimates by the CIA World Factbook and Pew Research Center, between 55 and 60% of Haitians are Catholics. Pope John Paul II visited Haiti in 1983. In a speech in the capital of Port-au-Prince, he criticized the government of Jean-Claude Duvalier. It is believed that the impact of this speech on the Catholic bureaucracy in Haiti contributed to his removal in 1986.

According to the Catholic Church in Haiti, the 10 dioceses of the two ecclesiastical provinces of Haiti include 251 parishes and about 1,500 Christian rural communities. The local clergy has 400 diocesan priests and 300 seminarians. There are also 1,300 religious missionary priests belonging to more than 70 religious order and fraternities. Vocations to the priesthood are plentiful.

=== Protestantism ===
The CIA Factbook reports that around 29.5% of the population is Protestant (Pentecostal 17.4%, Baptist 6.9%, Adventist 4%, Methodist 0.5% other 0.7%). Other sources put the Protestant population higher than this, suggesting that it may form one-third of the population today, as Protestant churches have experienced significant growth in recent decades.

The Episcopal Diocese of Haiti is the Anglican Communion diocese consisting of the entire territory of Haiti. It is part of Province 2 of the Episcopal Church (United States). Its cathedral, Holy Trinity (French: Cathédrale Sainte Trinité) located in the corner of Avenue Mgr. Guilloux and Rue Pavée in downtown Port-au-Prince, has been destroyed six times, including in the 2010 Haiti earthquake. It is the largest diocese in the Episcopal Church (United States), with 83,698 members reported in 2008.

Protestant missionaries have been active in Haiti since the early 19th century, with Evangelical missions increasing by the 1970s to convert large numbers of Haitians. Unlike mainline Protestants, who perceive of the belief in non-Christian spirits as superstitions, Evangelical Protestants recast Haitian Vodou spirits as demons against whom Christ would fight.

=== The Church of Jesus Christ of Latter-day Saints ===
Missionary work in Haiti by the Church of Jesus Christ of Latter-day Saints began in May 1980 and as of 2021 the church said it had 48 congregations and more than 24,000 members in Haiti.

Groundbreaking took place 28 October 2017 on a temple in Port-au-Prince.

== Vodou ==
The New World Afro-diasporic religion of Vodou is also practised. Vodou encompasses several different traditions, and consists of a mix encompassing African, European and indigenous Taíno religious elements. In this way, it is very similar to other Latin American syncretist movements, such as the Cuban Santería. It is more widespread in rural parts of the country, partly due to negative stigmas attached to its practice. During the season of Lent, Vodou societies create parading musical bands for a festival called Rara, and fulfill religious obligations in local spaces such as streams, rivers, and trees.

The CIA World Factbook reports that 2.1% of the population identifies its religion as Vodou, but adds that "many Haitians practice elements of Vodou in addition to another religion, most often Roman Catholicism". The proportion of Haitians that practice Vodou is disputed, due to the often syncretic manner in which it is practiced alongside Catholicism, in spite of the Church's strong condemnation of it. Haitian Protestants are presumably less likely to practice Vodou, as their churches strongly denounce it as diabolical.

== Islam ==
As of 2022, there is a small Islamic community in Haiti is approximately 10,000 Muslims.

In 2000, Nawoon Marcellus, a member of Fanmi Lavalas from Saint-Raphaël, became the first Muslim elected to the Chamber of Deputies of Haiti.

== Bahá'í Faith ==
The Baháʼí Faith in Haiti begins with a mention by `Abdu'l-Bahá, then head of the religion, in 1916 as one of the island countries of the Caribbean being among the places Baháʼís should take the religion to. The first Baháʼí to visit Haiti was Leonora Armstrong in 1927. After that others visited until Louis George Gregory visited in January 1937 and he mentions a small community of Baháʼís operating in Haiti. The first long term pioneers, Ruth and Ellsworth Blackwell, arrived in 1940. Following their arrival the first Baháʼí Local Spiritual Assembly of Haiti was formed in 1942 in Port-au-Prince. From 1951 the Haitian Baháʼís participated in regional organizations of the religion until 1961 when Haitian Baháʼís elected their own National Spiritual Assembly and soon took on goals reaching out into neighboring islands. The Association of Religion Data Archives (relying mostly on the World Christian Encyclopedia) estimated some 21,000 Baháʼís in Haiti in 2005 and about the same in 2010.

== Judaism ==
Sephardic Jews arrived in Saint-Domingue during the first days of the colonial period, despite that they were banned in the official Catholic edicts. They became merchants and integrated themselves into the French Catholic society. Waves of Jews continued to immigrate to the Haiti, including a group of Ashkenazi Jews escaping Hitler's Germany in the 1940s; Haiti was one of the few countries to welcome them openly. Haitian Catholics had idiosyncratic ideas about Jews, stemming from Catholic anti-Judaism, although many Vodou practitioners imagined themselves to be the descendants of Jews and to hold esoteric Judaic knowledge.

There is a group of Judaism predominantly residing in Port-au-Prince, where the community today meets at the home of businessman billionaire Gilbert Bigio, a Haitian of Syrian descent. Bigio's father first settled in Haiti in 1925 and was active in the Jewish community. In November 1947, his father played a significant role in Haiti's support for the statehood of Israel in a vote to the United Nations.

== Religious freedom ==
The constitution of Haiti establishes the freedom of religion. The Ministry of Foreign Affairs oversees and monitors religious groups and laws affecting them. While Catholicism has not been the state religion since 1987, a 19th-century concordat with the Holy See continues to confer preferential treatment to the Catholic Church, in the form of stipends for clergy and financial support to churches and religious schools.

Religious groups are not required to register with the government, but may do so in order to receive special standing in legal proceedings, tax exemptions, and civil recognition for marriage and baptismal certificates. The government has continually failed to recognize marriages performed by Haitian Vodou practitioners, despite it being a registered religion. Government officials claim that they are working with the Vodou community to establish a certification process for their clergy in order to resolve this issue.

In 2022, the National Council of Haitian Muslims noted that the Muslim community has not completed the required registration documentation. Representatives of the Vodou community have reported social stigma against their communities in 2022, but note more acceptance of their beliefs.

In 2023, the country scored 3 out of 4 for religious freedom.

== See also ==
- Catholic Church in Haiti
- Protestantism in Haiti
- Judaism in Haiti
