= NET Ministries of Canada =

Canadian branch of Catholic organization

- Formation: 1994
- Type: Catholic youth ministry
- Headquarters: Ottawa, Ontario
- Region served: Canada
- Executive Director: Pierre O'Reilly
- Parent organization: NET Ministries
- Website: NET Canada

NET Canada is the Canadian branch of NET Ministries also simply known as NET, an acronym for National Evangelization Teams. NET itself is a Roman Catholic Christian organization dedicated to spreading the Gospel to youth. NET Canada defines itself as committed to following Christ who is its inspiration and Guide. To this end, members of NET are committed to discernment and a moral life in accord with the clear teaching of Scripture and Magisterium of the Roman Catholic Church. NET's mission is to evangelize young Catholics, reaching them through retreats and parish ministry. The goal is to challenge these young Catholics to love Christ and embrace the life of the Church.

== How NET Spreads the Gospel ==
NET identifies four ways to achieve its goal:

1. By proclaiming of the Gospel through members' witness of faith and a missionary lifestyle.
2. By inviting young people to personally encounter Christ and live for Him.
3. By forming young people in Christian character through the study and practice of the faith.
4. By equipping youth workers and young adults with ministry skills for youth evangelization.

== Beginnings ==
NET Ministries was founded in the United States and is based in Saint Paul, Minnesota in the diocese of St. Paul and Minneapolis. NET's roots go back to the St. Paul Catholic Youth Center (CYC) which offered a variety of programs from 1939 to 1989.

In 1980 NET's founder, Mark Berchem, through CYC organized eighteen high school youth retreats around southern Minnesota. Young adults traveled in a van giving these retreats over a three-week period in January. The following January three teams of youth were sent to Winona, Minnesota, Fargo, North Dakota, and Sioux Falls, South Dakota. In 1981 these missions extended to a full year commitment. In 1982 the acronym NET (standing for National Evangelization Team) became name of this movement, inspired by Mark 1:17 and Luke 5:4.

CYC closed in 1989 and NET was incorporated as a nonprofit corporation under the Archbishop of St. Paul and Minneapolis. In 1988 NET teams first travelled and gave retreats in Canada. In 1994, the sister organization, NET Ministries of Canada, was established by James Mikulasik and came under the ecclesiastical vigilance of the archbishop of Ottawa.

In August 2001, along with traveling retreat teams, NET Canada started a parish-based program in which a team of young adults minister in a parish instead of travelling. NET Canada helped establish NET Ireland as an autonomous organization. NET Ministries of Canada is governed by a Board of directors currently made up of ten members.

== Work ==
NET Canada's evangelical efforts span across Canada, and Ireland, as well as working closely with NET USA and NET Australia. In a year NET Canada leads over 300 retreats in 32 dioceses across Canada from British Columbia to Newfoundland. NET team members will pray with hundreds of host families and will minister to 25,000 youth in Canada. Since 1994 NET Canada has proclaimed the Gospel to over 160,000 youth.

NET Canada follows the school year. From December to August young adults (ages 18–30) apply to be on a NET team by filling out an application, obtaining two references and arranging an interview. The young adults who are accepted will commit to being trained and serving NET from mid-August to June. Retreats are scheduled from October to May.

A travelling team will lead from 120 to 150 retreats each year. These young adults travel in (depending on the team) one or two vans, living with host families with only one suitcase and one backpack of personal effects. NET retreats are offered for youth from grades 6 to 12. Volunteer contacts within each diocese or parish liaise with the NET office to book teams for retreats and select retreat themes and formats.

Discipleship ministry are the parish-based teams who minister in a parish or region. These are generally teams of eight. In eight months they establish a youth ministry program and train youth leaders from the community to continue the program after they leave.

== Finances ==
NET Canada's financial support comes from three sources:

1. One third of the cost of mission is covered through the applicants' personal fund raising effort. These applicants are aided in their fund raising by the NET office.
2. One third of the cost is covered by retreat fees and parish fees.
3. One third of the cost is from general fund raising conducted by NET staff.

In 2015, NET Ministries of Canada reported an income of $1,395,285.00 with $37,355.00 from outside Canada.

== See also ==
- Catholic spirituality
- Fellowship of Catholic University Students
- Life Teen
- Universal call to holiness
- Vocational Discernment in the Catholic Church
- World Youth Day
