= Catholic catechesis =

Teaching the Catholic faith

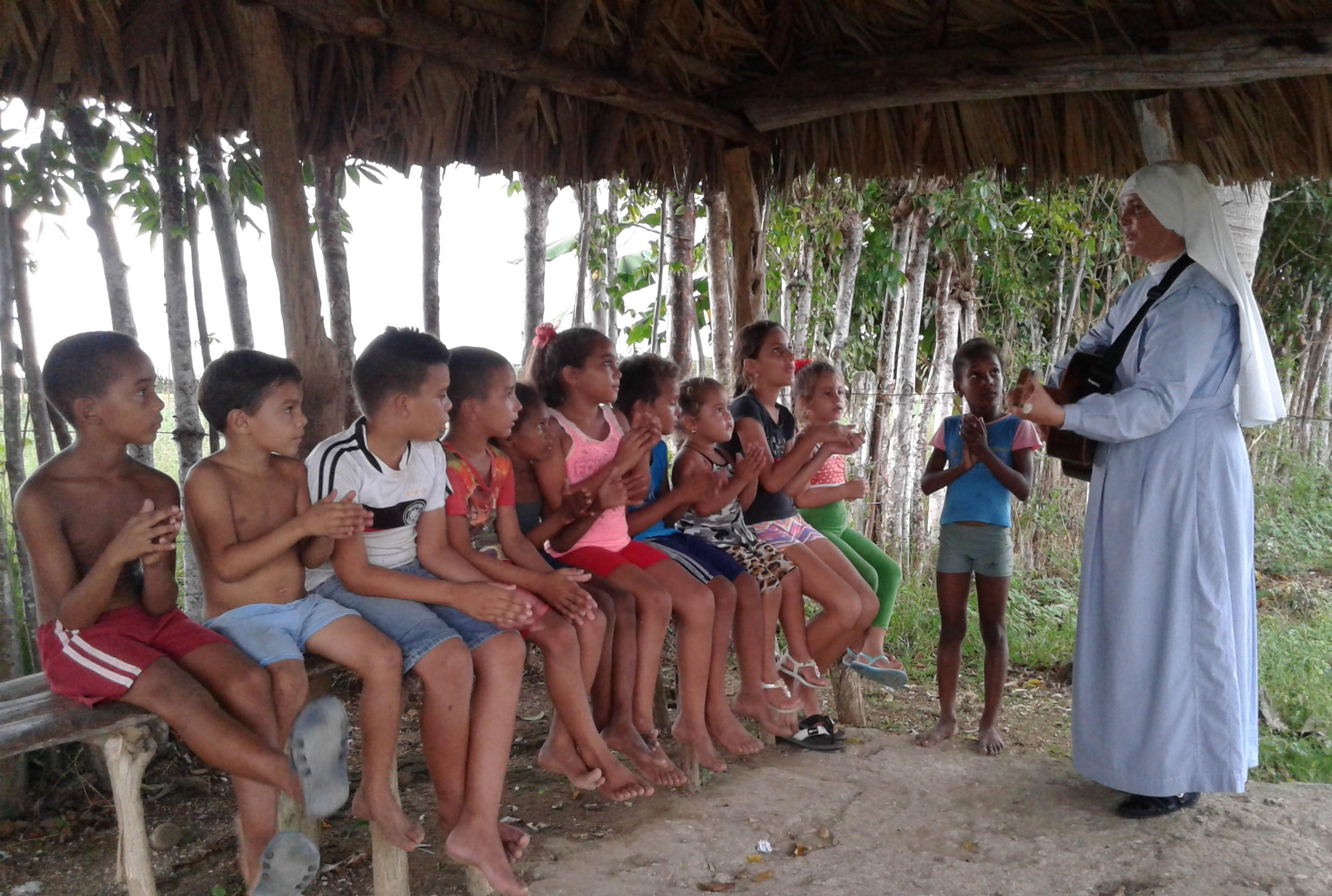
A Catholic missionary catechizes children in Cuba

The function of Catholic catechesis is to teach (catechize or catechise) the faith of the Catholic Church by both word and example, and a catechist is a person appointed to perform this function. The Church's Directory for Catechesis states that faith must be "known, celebrated, lived, and turned into prayer" in a personal and total encounter of the heart, mind and senses with Christ. St. John Paul II describes the aim of catechesis as putting "people not only in touch but in communion, in intimacy, with Jesus Christ".

The Second Vatican Council identified catechetical instruction as the "foremost" means by which the Church "enlightens and strengthens the faith, nourishes life according to the spirit of Christ, leads to intelligent and active participation in the liturgical mystery and gives motivation for apostolic activity". In its Decree concerning the Pastoral Office of Bishops in the Church, the Council directed bishops to "take care that catechists be properly trained for their function so that they will be thoroughly acquainted with the doctrine of the Church and will have both a theoretical and a practical knowledge of the laws of psychology and of pedagogical methods.

Papal audiences often contain teaching presentations referred to as "catechesis", for example Pope Francis' audiences incorporated "catechesis", and Pope Leo XIV's general audiences in August 2025 incorporated his "continuing catechesis on the Jubilee theme of 'Christ our Hope'".

== Catechists in the Catholic Church ==
The Directory for Catechesis describes the catechist as "a Christian who receives a particular calling from God that, when accepted in faith, empowers him for the service of transmission of the faith and for the task of initiating others into the Christian life".

To catechize means to teach: more specifically, to teach by word of mouth. Prior to the Second Vatican Council, the chief catechists at the parish level were priests, religious brothers or sisters. Since the late 20th century, particularly in Europe and the Americas, increasingly the role of the parish catechist has been undertaken by the lay people. In addition to activities in the parish, catechizing also takes place in Catholic schools through more formal classes as part of the curriculum.

Catechists are often deployed to work with candidates who are preparing for the sacraments of Reconciliation, First Holy Communion, Confirmation and Baptism (after completing the Rite of Christian Initiation of Adults, or RCIA). Various age-appropriate religious education texts and materials are used for instruction in addition to the Catechism of the Catholic Church.

Catechists have always been of particular importance in large geographical parishes, such as in Africa, where priests have historically only been able to visit different parts of their parish periodically. In the priest's absence, the parish catechist takes on the role of being the main teacher of the faith in that parish. As such they are afforded a particular place of honor within their parish community.

The General Instruction of the Roman Missal allows for institution of catechists should any Episcopal Conference determine that the role is required.

An episcopal conference may request permission from the Apostolic See:

...if they judge the establishment of such offices in their region to be necessary or very useful because of special reasons. To these belong, for example, the ministries of porter, exorcist, catechist, as well as others to be conferred on those who are dedicated to works of charity, where this ministry had not been assigned to deacons.

== Documents on catechesis ==
=== Guide for Catechists (1993) ===
In 1993 the Congregation for the Evangelization of Peoples (formerly the Sacred Congregation for the Propagation of the Faith) published the Guide for Catechists, with the sub-heading Document of vocational, formative, and promotional orientation of Catechists in the territories dependent on the Congregation for the Evangelization of Peoples.

This document was therefore intended only for catechists at work in the missionary territories of the Church. It also made a specific distinction between the catechists working in these areas and catechists at work in "older Churches" such as in the West. As such the detailed framework and structure this document outlines for the selection, formation, oversight and deployment of catechists within the "mission territories" has not necessarily been applied to catechists at work elsewhere within the Catholic Church.

The introduction to this document states:

The Congregation for the Evangelisation of Peoples directly experiences the undisputed effectiveness of lay catechists. Under priests, they continue with frankness to announce "the Good News" to their brothers and sisters of other religions, preparing them for entry into the ecclesial community through baptism. Through religious instruction, preparation for the sacraments, animation of prayer, and other works of charity, they help the baptized grow in the Christian life fervor. Where there is a shortage of priests, the catechists are also entrusted with the pastoral guidance of the little community separated from the Centre. Often, they are called to witness to their faith by harsh trials and painful privations. The history of evangelization past and present attests to their constancy even to the giving of life itself. Catechists are truly the pride of the missionary Church!

=== Note with Pastoral Recommendations for the Year of Faith (2012) ===
On 6 January 2012, the Solemnity of the Epiphany of the Lord, the Congregation for the Doctrine of the Faith published the Note with pastoral recommendations for the Year of Faith. This document provided explanation and suggestions at different levels for parishioners in preparation for the Year of Faith declared by Pope Benedict XVI with the apostolic letter of 11 October 2011, Porta fidei. The Year of Faith began on 11 October 2012, the 50th anniversary of the opening of the Second Vatican Council. It was scheduled to end on 24 November 2013, the Solemnity of our Lord Jesus Christ, Universal King.

This note made the following recommendations in relation to catechists:

At the diocesan level

2. It would be desirable that each Diocese in the world organize a study day on the Catechism of the Catholic Church, particularly for its priests, consecrated persons and catechists.

5. It would be appropriate for each particular Church to review the reception of Vatican Council II and the Catechism of the Catholic Church in its own life and mission, particularly in the realm of catechesis. This would provide the opportunity for a renewal of commitment on the part of the catechetical offices of the Dioceses which – supported by the Commissions for Catechesis of the Episcopal Conferences – have the duty to care for the theological formation of catechists.

At the parish level

4. Catechists should hold more firmly to the doctrinal richness of the Catechism of the Catholic Church and, under the direction of their pastors, offer guidance in reading this precious document to groups of faithful, working toward a deeper common understanding thereof, with the goal of creating small communities of faith, and of giving witness to the Lord Jesus.

== Recognition of the ministry of catechist ==
There is increasing awareness, acknowledgement, and recognition by the Church hierarchy of the important role catechists play in the life of the Catholic Church, and with it the responsibilities the Church has towards them. The latter is clear from the explicit reference in the Note with pastoral recommendations for the Year of Faith highlighting the "duty of care" each local Bishop has towards the theological formation of the catechists at work within their diocese.

On 11 May 2021, Pope Francis instituted the ministry of catechist with the apostolic letter and Motu proprio entitled Antiquum Ministerium.

Pope Francis also approved and published an Editio typica [typical edition] which introduced a specific Rite of Institution of Catechists to be used after 1 January 2022.

== See also ==
- Catholic spirituality
- Gravissimum educationis
- Lay ecclesial ministry
- Life Teen
- Rite of Christian Initiation of Adults
- Universal call to holiness
- Vocational Discernment in the Catholic Church
- World Youth Day
