= Matt Fradd =

American author and podcaster (born 1983)

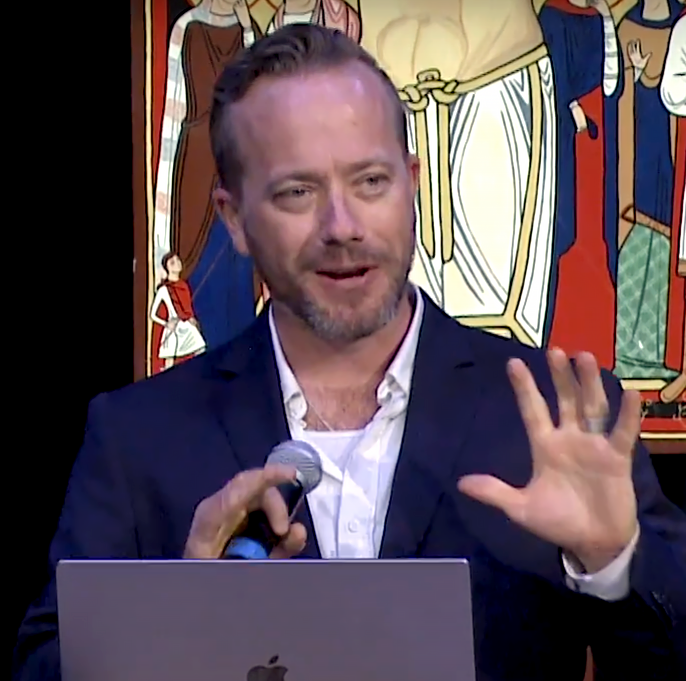
- Fradd in 2022
- Born: July 16, 1983 (age 43)
- Education: Holy Apostles College and Seminary
- Occupations: Author, podcaster, motivational speaker
- Website: pintswithaquinas.com

Matthew Fradd (born July 16, 1983) is an Australian-American author, podcaster, and Catholic motivational speaker. He hosts his podcast, Pints with Aquinas, founded in March 2016, which became part of The Daily Wire in January 2026.

== Media career ==
=== Talks and conferences ===
Fradd speaks at conferences to young adults on the topic of pornography and its potential harms. He has served as a keynote speaker at the SEEK Conferences in 2015, 2019, 2024, and 2026.

=== Pints with Aquinas ===
Pints with Aquinas
- Genre: Religion & Spirituality
- Format: Video; Audio
- Language: English

Cast and voices
- Hosted by: Matt Fradd

Production
- Length: 2–4+ hours

Publication
- No. of episodes: 4,113 (as of June 16, 2026)
- Original release: March 29, 2016 – present

Related

YouTube information
- Channel: Matt Fradd
- Years active: 2013–present
- Genre: Catholicism
- Subscribers: 891 thousand
- Views: 267.8 million
- Last updated: November 6, 2026

On March 29, 2016, Fradd launched Pints with Aquinas, a Catholic long-form discussion podcast based on the writings of Thomas Aquinas.

From June 2018 to October 2024, Dominican friar, Fr. Gregory Pine, O.P., appeared on the podcast and produced several 15–20-minute bonus episodes. Fradd has hosted prominent figures in the Catholic Church, including Fr. Mike Schmitz, Jason Evert, Donald Calloway, Jimmy Akin, and Dr. Scott Hahn.

Pints with Aquinas has achieved recognition in podcast rankings, reaching No. 16 in the United States for Religion & Spirituality and No. 25 in Christianity.

On October 28, 2025, Fradd announced that Pints with Aquinas would join The Daily Wire in January 2026 as part of a partnership agreement. Under the arrangement, Fradd said that he would retain full editorial control, and the show continued its Catholic-themed content while receiving expanded production support and a larger platform. In December 2025, Fradd released a teaser episode for Christmas with Dr. Scott Hahn to promote the show’s move to The Daily Wire. In a subsequent video, Fradd wore a kippah and made a satirical reference to coverage of Judaism, later explaining that the partnership would not compromise the content of the show. The first episode of Pints with Aquinas on The Daily Wire was released on January 3, 2026, as an interview on The Morning Wire.

=== Love People Use Things ===
On December 6, 2017, Fradd began co-hosting the podcast Love People Use Things with Noah Church. The show focused on the dangers of pornography and concluded in late 2019 after 49 episodes.

=== The Matt Fradd Show ===
In 2018, Fradd launched The Matt Fradd Show, a Catholic long-form discussion podcast. In 2019, he restructured Pints with Aquinas as a long-form discussion format, expanding its focus beyond theology, philosophy, and the writings of Thomas Aquinas.

=== Catholic Lo-Fi ===
In 2022, Fradd launched a Catholic lo-fi channel featuring cartoon animations with Gregorian chant. Notable videos include Sleepy Dad and Rosary Girl. Joshua Masterson provided the animations accompanying each video, and the audio contributions of religious brothers are uncredited per the content creators’ request.

=== Truthly AI ===
In 2024, Fradd, along with Jacob Ciccarelli, Zac Johnson, Paul Kim, and Karim Chehadé created a Catholic AI chat bot app similar to ChatGPT called Truthly which uses artificial intelligence to help answer questions concerning the Catholic Church.

== Social views ==
=== Pornography ===
Fradd is known for his public criticism of pornography, describing it as harmful to relationships and human dignity. In a talk reported by The Catholic Herald, he argued that pornography contributes to addiction, distorts expectations, and objectifies people. A report from the Archdiocese of Montreal summarized a lecture in which Fradd said that pornography "dehumanizes the human person" and promotes unrealistic sexual norms. In an interview highlighted by Live Action with Lila Rose, Fradd described contemporary sexual culture as "anti-love" and stated that pornography undermines the proper purpose of sexuality.

=== Abortion ===
Fradd has expressed opposition to abortion. In an interview reported by Live Action, he described abortion as "a wicked thing." A 2019 episode of Pints with Aquinas featured a pro-life discussion in which Fradd and a guest argued against abortion and in favor of protecting unborn life.

=== Sexual morality ===
Fradd has discussed issues of sexual ethics in interviews and on his podcast Pints with Aquinas. In a feature by America Magazine, he connected pornography use to spiritual and psychological struggles, recommending a combination of prayer, accountability, and therapy. His podcast has also hosted conversations about Christian teaching on sexuality, including discussions involving same-sex attraction and the distinction between identity and behavior.

=== Sex before marriage ===
Fradd has both spoken and written about Catholic doctrine involving premarital sex. He has significantly talked about sexual ethics, including the view that sexual activity belongs within marriage. Reporting on one of his talks, the Catholic Herald noted that Fradd connects pornography use and broader sexual behavior to what he considers a loss of chastity and respect for the human person.

=== Religion, culture, and politics ===
Fradd frequently comments on broader cultural issues from a Catholic perspective. Coverage by The Daily Wire summarized his remarks about the role of religious values in sustaining Western cultural traditions and strengthening family life.

== Personal life ==
Matthew Fradd was born June 10, 1983, in Australia, and earned his undergraduate and master’s degrees in philosophy from Holy Apostles College. Raised in a Catholic family, he was not religiously observant in childhood, and by age 12, he identified as an agnostic. He later converted to Catholicism at World Youth Day in Rome in 2000, at the age of 17.

Fradd met his wife, Cameron, at NET Ministries in Ireland, and they married on August 12, 2006. The couple participated in NET Ministries in Ireland and Canada. They have four children and currently attend an Eastern Catholic church that celebrates in the Byzantine Rite.

Fradd began working with Catholic Answers in 2012, collaborating with Jimmy Akin and Joe Heschmeyer in apologetics and evangelization. In 2024, Fradd and his family relocated from Steubenville, Ohio, to Florida for his wife’s health. In late 2025, after moving his podcast to The Daily Wire, he moved to Nashville, Tennessee.

== Bibliography ==
- Delivered: True Stories of Men and Women Who Turned from Porn to Purity (2014)
- Restored: True Stories of Love and Trust After Porn (2015)
- 20 Answers – Atheism: 20 Answers Series from Catholic Answers (2016)
- Pints with Aquinas: 50+ Deep Thoughts from the Angelic Doctor (2016)
- The Porn Myth: Exposing the Reality Behind the Fantasy of Pornography (2017)
- Does God Exist?: A Socratic Dialogue on the Five Ways of Thomas Aquinas (2019)
- Pocket Guide to the Rosary (2019)
- Forged: 33 Days Toward Freedom (2020)
- Marian Consecration with Aquinas: A Nine Day Path for Growing Closer to the Mother of God (2020)
- How to Be Happy: Saint Thomas' Secret to a Good Life (2021)
- Sibling Horror: A Collection of Stories (2021)
- Jesus Our Refuge (2025)

== See also ==
- Catholic sexual ethics
- Christian apologetics
- Chastity
