= NET Ministries =

American Catholic youth missionary organization

NET Ministries, also simply known as NET USA or NET (National Evangelization Teams) is a Catholic youth missionary organization.

== History ==
NET Ministries was founded in the United States and is based in Saint Paul, Minnesota, in the Archdiocese of St. Paul and Minneapolis. NET's roots go back to the St. Paul Catholic Youth Center (CYC), which offered a variety of programs from 1939 to 1989.

In 1980, NET's founder Mark Berchem, through CYC, organized eighteen high school youth retreats around southern Minnesota. Young adults traveled in a van giving these retreats over a three-week period in January. The following January three teams of youth were sent to Winona, Minnesota, Fargo, North Dakota, and Sioux Falls, South Dakota. In 1981 these missions extended to a full year commitment. In 1982 the acronym NET (standing for National Evangelization Teams) became name of this movement, inspired by Mark 1:17 and Luke 5:4.

These developments were centred around the Catholic Charismatic covenant community 'Christ the Redeemer' (a member of the Sword of the Spirit association of covenant communities) where NET board member Jim Kolar works as coordinator.

In 1988, Michael Kolar was the president of NET and director of the CYC. In depositions between 1988 and 1991, after being accused of engaging in child sexual abuse, Kolar admitted to having abused young adults at the Catholic Youth Center in St. Paul and elsewhere; after being the subject of a lawsuit by alleged victims, Kolar voluntarily left the priesthood.

CYC closed in 1989 and NET was incorporated as a nonprofit corporation under the Archbishop of St. Paul and Minneapolis.

=== NET in other countries ===
In 1988, NET Ministries expanded to Australia, and to Canada in 1994. NET Australia and NET Canada are now separate organizations. In 2004, NET Uganda started as an offshoot of NET Australia, and NET Canada started a sister organization in Ireland. NET Scotland is currently run through NET USA.

== Programs ==
Each year, around 180 young Catholics from ages 18–28 are accepted to be "netters" for the year. After a four-week training, they are divided into around sixteen teams of 8-15 members. Each team is either a "retreat team" or a "discipleship team." Retreat teams travel around the United States in a van with a trailer, conducting retreats and parishes and schools. Discipleship teams are based at a parish or school and stay there the entire year serving the local parish community.

== Notable alumni ==
- Bishop Andrew H. Cozzens
- Bishop Scott McCaig
- Matt Fradd

== See also ==
- Sword of the Spirit
- Catholic spirituality
- Fellowship of Catholic University Students
- Life Teen
- Universal call to holiness
- Vocational discernment in the Catholic Church
- World Youth Day
