= Fradd =

Fradd is a surname. Notable people with the surname include:

- Elizabeth Fradd (1949–2024), British nursing administrator
- Matt Fradd (born 1983), American author and podcaster
- Robbie Fradd (born 1964), South African jockey
