= Saint Paul's Outreach =

US Catholic missionary organization

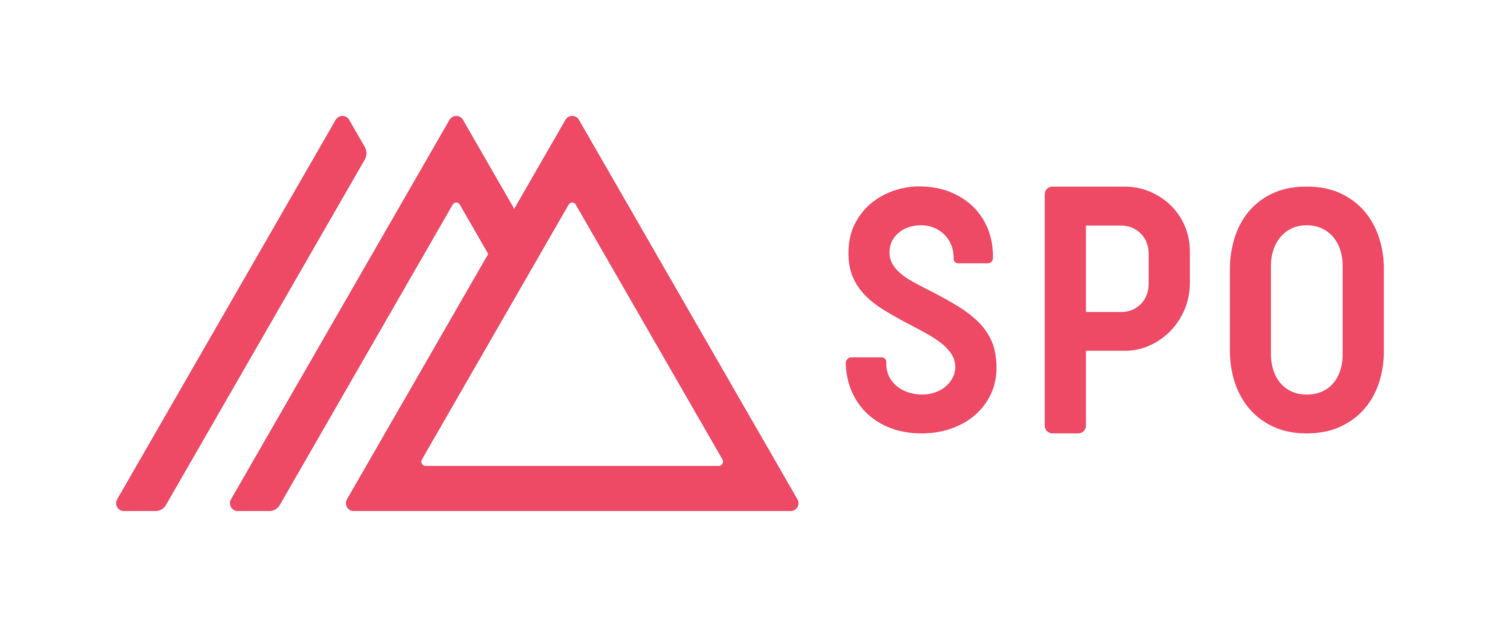
- Abbreviation: SPO
- Established: 1985; 41 years ago
- Founders: Gordy DeMarais, Christina Smith, Fr. Kevin Finnegan
- Purpose: Campus ministry and young adult outreach
- Headquarters: Mendota Heights, Minnesota
- Region served: United States
- President: David Fischer
- Website: spo.org

Saint Paul's Outreach (SPO) is a Catholic missionary organization in the United States which serves college students and young adults. Affiliated with the Catholic Charismatic Renewal, SPO describes its mission as follows: "to build transformational communities that form missionary disciples for life."

== Description ==
SPO was founded as a private association of the faithful in the Archdiocese of Saint Paul and Minneapolis where it reached students at the University of St. Thomas. By 2016 it had mission centers in seven different parts of the country.

Affiliated with the Catholic Charismatic Renewal, SPO sees itself as a movement of the "new evangelization" popularized by Pope John Paul II. Its ministry model is "reach, call, form, send."

In 2016, SPO's Kansas City mission center expanded to include the University of Missouri–Kansas City. SPO's Florida region expanded to the University of South Florida in 2021.

== Current chapter locations ==
- Arizona
  - Arizona State University
- Florida
  - University of Central Florida
  - University of South Florida
- Kansas City
  - Benedictine College
  - Johnson County Community College
  - University of Missouri–Kansas City
- Minnesota
  - University of Minnesota, Twin Cities
  - University of St. Thomas
- Ohio
  - Ohio State University
  - University of Cincinnati
- Northeastern United States
  - Northeastern University
  - Rutgers University
  - Seton Hall University
- Texas
  - Texas State University

== Notable former members ==
- Andrew H. Cozzens, bishop of the Diocese of Crookston

== See also ==
- Catholic Christian Outreach
- Fellowship of Catholic University Students
- NET Ministries
