= Diocese of Anse-à-Veau and Miragoâne =

Roman Catholic diocese in Haiti

Coordinates: 18.5025°N 73.3450°W

Diocese of Anse-à-Veau and Miragoâne Dioecesis Sinuvitullensis-Miragoanensis Diocèse d'Anse-à-Veau et Miragoâne Dyosèz Ansavo ak Miragwàn
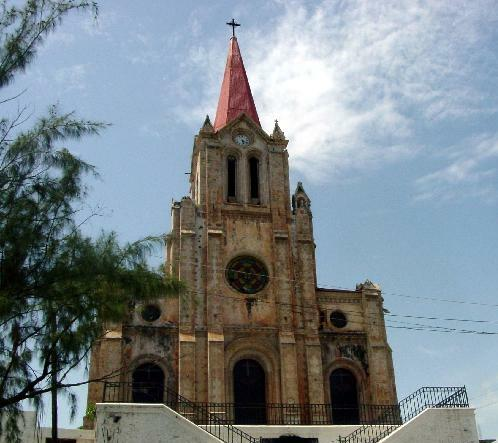
- Saint-Jean-Baptiste de Miragoâne Cathedral

Location
- Country: Haiti
- Territory: Nippes
- Ecclesiastical province: Port-au-Prince

Statistics
- Area: 1,100 km^{2} (420 sq mi)
- Population: Total; Catholics: (as of 2008); 375,000; 222,000 (59.2%)
- Parishes: 17

Information
- Denomination: Roman Catholic
- Rite: Latin Rite
- Established: 13 July 2008 (17 years ago)
- Cathedral: Cathedral of St. Anne
- Co-cathedral: Co-Cathedral of St. John the Baptist

Current leadership
- Pope: Leo XIV
- Bishop: Pierre-André Dumas

Map

The Diocese of Anse-à-Veau and Miragoâne (Latin: Dioecesis Sinuvitullensis-Miragoanensis; French: Diocèse d'Anse-à-Veau et Miragoâne; Haitian Creole: Dyosèz Ansavo ak Miragwàn) is a diocese located in the Nippes, Haiti. It is part of the ecclesiastical province of Port-au-Prince.

== History ==
On 13 July 2008 Pope Benedict XVI established the Diocese of Anse-à-Veau et Miragoâne from the Diocese of Les Cayes.

== Ordinaries ==
- Pierre-André Dumas (July 13, 2008 – present)

== Notable churches ==
- Cathedral of Saint Anne in Anse-à-Veau
- Co-Cathedral of Saint John the Baptist in Miragoâne
