= Order of Christian Initiation of Adults =

Christian conversion process

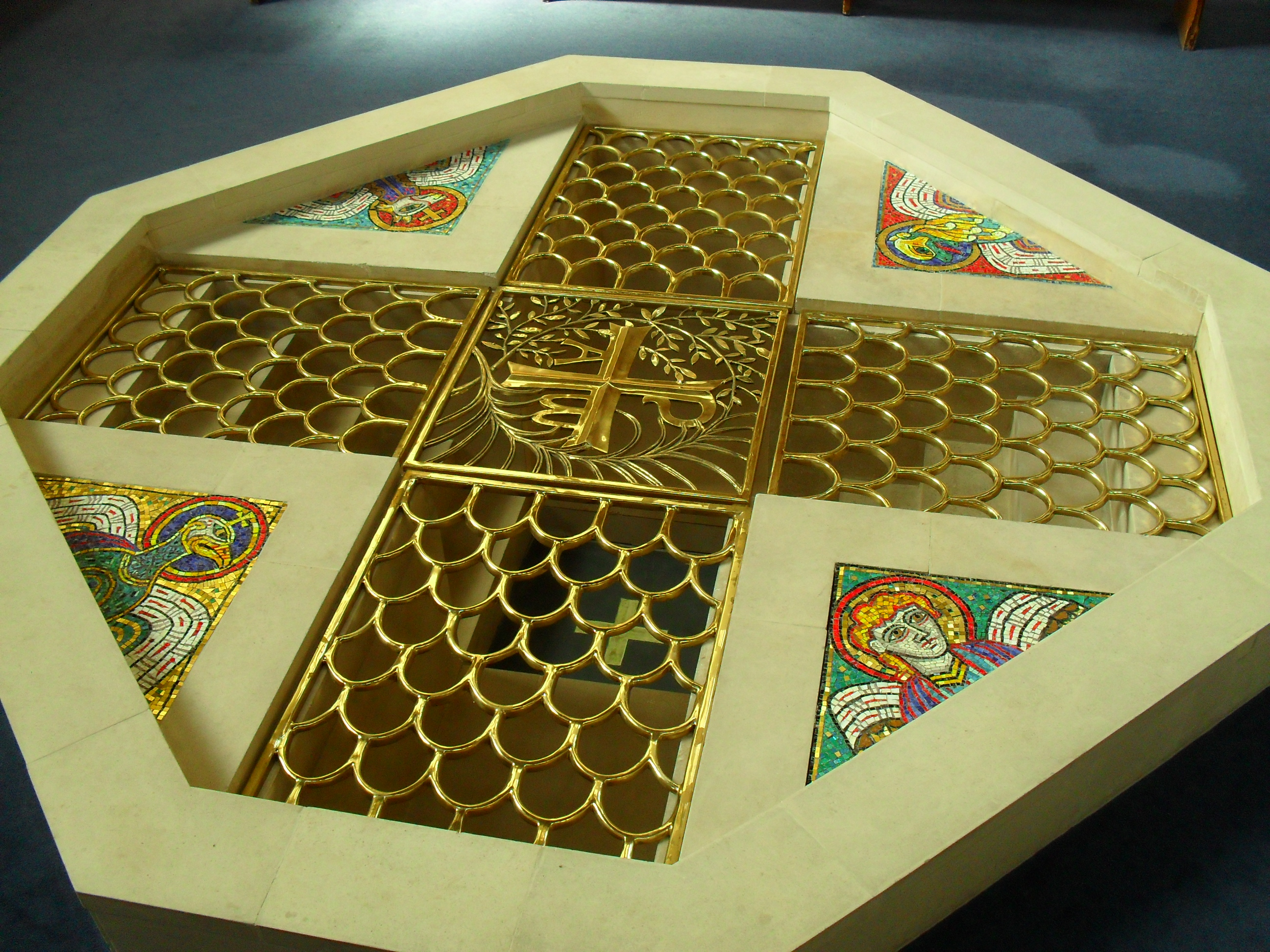
A contemporary baptismal font, inspired by the baptismal fonts of the early church, suitable for full-immersion baptisms of adults

The Order of Christian Initiation of Adults (Latin: Ordo initiationis christianae adultorum), or OCIA, known as the Rite of Christian Initiation of Adults (RCIA) in many English-speaking countries, is a process developed by the Catholic Church for its catechumenate for prospective converts to the Catholic faith above the age of infant baptism. Candidates are gradually introduced to aspects of Catholic beliefs and practices. At the Second Vatican Council, the fathers of the Council announced that "the catechumenate for adults" was to be restored and used at the discretion of local bishops. The basic process applies to adults and children who have reached catechetical age.

In the United States, the name was changed from Rite of Christian Initiation of Adults (RCIA) to the OCIA in 2021 to reflect greater fidelity to the original Latin, and this change was approved by the Dicastery for Divine Worship and the Discipline of the Sacraments.

Priests "have the responsibility of attending to the pastoral and personal care of the catechumens". Throughout the process, they are assisted in this by deacons and catechists.

== Duration ==
The United States bishops have said that the process "should extend for at least one year for formation, instruction, and probation" for those who have had no previous experience with living a Christian life. However, "nothing [...] can be settled a priori. The time spent in the catechumenate should be long enough—several years if necessary—for the conversion and faith of the catechumens to become strong." For those who have some experience leading a Christian life, the process should be much shorter, "according to the individual case".

== Outline of process ==
The ideal is for there to be an OCIA or RCIA process available in every Roman Catholic parish. Those who want to join an OCIA group should aim to attend one in the parish where they live.

For those who wish to join, the OCIA process is a period of reflection, prayer, instruction, discernment, and formation. There is no set timetable, and those who join the process are encouraged to go at their own pace and to take as much time as they need. Those who enter the process are expected to begin attending Mass on Sundays, participate in regular faith formation activities, and to become increasingly involved in the activities of their local parish.

The Second Vatican Council specifically ordered that "the methodology and the experiences of adult formation in the RCIA [should be] the pattern of growth for the whole Christian community".

The outline below is based upon the Order of Christian Initiation of Adults (OCIA) approved for use in the dioceses of the United States, which includes additional rites for various circumstances and combinations.

=== Period of Evangelization and Precatechumenate ===
The first stage of the OCIA, as outlined in paragraphs 36–40 of the Rite of Christian Initiation of Adults, is described as "a time, of no fixed duration or structure, for inquiry and introduction to Gospel values." The church is offering here an invitation to initial conversion. There is no obligation involved during this period. "It is a time of evangelization: faithfully and constantly the living God is proclaimed and Jesus Christ who he has sent for the salvation of all." At this stage, seekers are known as Inquirers.

==== Acceptance into the Order of Catechumens ====
Inquirers who wish continue on to the period of the catechumenate take part in a rite of Acceptance into the Order of Catechumens.

The rite of Acceptance into the Order of Catechumens, as outlined in paragraphs 41–47 of the Rite of Initiation, may take place throughout the year. "A sponsor accompanies any candidate seeking admission as a catechumen." Ideally, the sponsor is provided to the candidate by the parish. The duties of a sponsor are to journey with the catechumens through the process and provide a compelling witness in matters of faith.

Acceptance into the Order of Catechumens is very significant, so much so that unbaptized catechumens who are accepted will still receive a Christian burial if they die during the Catechumenate.

The Rite of Acceptance is outlined in paragraphs 48–68 of the Rite of Initiation:

- Greeting
- Opening dialogue
- Candidates' first acceptance of the Gospel
- Affirmation by the sponsors and the assembly
- Signing of the candidates with the Cross:
  - Signing of the forehead
  - Signing of the other senses – optional
  - Concluding prayer
- Invitation to the celebration of the word of God

The Mass then goes on as usual, with the addition of the Liturgy of the Word:

- Instruction
- Readings
- Homily
- [Presentation of a Bible] (optional)
- Intercessions for the catechumens
- Prayer over the catechumens

At this point a new portion is added:

- Dismissal of the Catechumens

From this point until their baptisms, catechumens are dismissed after the liturgy of the word when they attend Mass. This is to make the process feel more like it was in the early church, when catechumens were dismissed before communion before their baptism, which might have taken years to prepare for, to make the communion more meaningful.

==== Rite of Welcoming the Candidates [411 – 415] ====
Inquirers who have already been validly baptized in a non-Catholic ecclesial community, or baptized Catholic but not catechized as a child (have not received first Eucharist), are welcomed to the next stage via the Rite of Welcoming the Candidates, as defined in paragraphs 412–415 of the Rite of Initiation.

Catechumens who enter this rite are known as "candidates" from now on. Their rite of welcoming the candidates often does not take place at the same time as the catechumen's rite of acceptance.

The outline of this rite is as follows [416 – 433]:

Receiving the Candidates

- Salutation
- Opening Dialogue
- Candidates' Declaration Of Intent
- Affirmation by the Sponsors and the Assembly
- Signing of the Candidates with the Cross:
  - Signing of the Forehead
  - [Signing of the Other Senses] – optional
  - Concluding Prayer

The Mass then continues as normal: Liturgy of the Word

- Instruction
- Readings
- Homily
- [Presentation of a Bible] – optional
- Profession of Faith
- General Intercessions

(At this point there is a special prayer over the candidates)

- [Dismissal of the Assembly] – if the Eucharist is not to be celebrated

Liturgy of the Eucharist

Candidates are sometimes dismissed during the Mass.

==== Combined Rite [505 – 506] ====
Where there are both unbaptized and baptized inquirers in a parish, there is the option to use a combined rite at this stage. This rite is formally known as "The (Combined) Celebration of the Rite of Acceptance into the Order of Catechumens and the Rite of Welcoming Baptized but Previously Uncatechized Adults Who are Preparing for Confirmation and/or Eucharist or Reception into the Full Communion of the Catholic Church".

The outline of this rite is as follows [507 – 529]:

Receiving the Candidates

- Greeting
- Opening Dialogue with Candidates for the Catechumenate and with the Candidates for Post-baptismal Catechesis
- Catechumens' First Acceptance of the Gospel
- Candidates' Declaration of Intent
- Affirmation by the Sponsors and the Assembly
- Signing of the Catechumens and of the Candidates with the Cross:
  - Signing of the Forehead of the Catechumens
  - [Signing of the Other Senses of the Catechumens] – optional
  - Signing of the Forehead of the Candidates
  - [Signing of the Other Senses of the Candidates] – optional
  - Concluding Prayer
- Invitation to the Celebration of the Word of God

Liturgy of the Word

- Instruction
- Readings
- Homily
- [Presentation of a Bible] – optional
- Intercessions
- Prayer over the Catechumens and Candidates
- Dismissal of the Catechumens

Liturgy of the Eucharist

These rites delineate the transition between the Period of Inquiry into the Period of the Catechumenate. The rites take place when the members of the local church are gathered together for the Eucharistic celebration.

=== Period of the Catechumenate [75 – 80] ===
A catechumen (from Latin catechumenus, Greek κατηχουμενος, instructed) is one receiving instruction in the principles of the Christian religion with a view to baptism. It is for this reason that those who are already validly baptized in another Christian Faith are not known as catechumens, but rather candidates.

The Catechumenate is an extended period during which the candidates are given suitable pastoral formation and guidance, aimed at training them in the Christian life. [75]

This is achieved in four ways {paraphrased}:

- Suitable catechesis; solidly supported by celebrations of the Word.
- The Catechumens learning to:
  - turn more readily to God in prayer
  - bear witness to the Faith
  - keep their hopes set on Christ
  - follow supernatural inspiration in their deeds
  - practice the love of neighbour, even at the cost of self-renunciation
- Suitable liturgical rites, which purify the Catechumens little by little and strengthen them with God's blessing; including celebrations of the Word.
- Learning to work actively with others to spread the Gospel.

From the Order of Christian Initiation of Adults

The period of the Catechumenate is a time for:

- Continuing to build community within the group
- Getting more involved in parish activities, getting to know the parish community
- Learning about the basic teachings and beliefs of the Catholic Church
- Exploring important and foundational Scripture passages

More importantly, it is a time for:

- Continuing to examine God's presence in our lives, past and present
- Developing prayer life, entering into the communal worship of the parish
- Fostering conversion
- Developing or improving our relationship with God

Various rites pertain to this period of instruction for those who are unbaptized (catechumens):

- Celebrations of the Word of God [81 – 89]
- Minor Exorcisms (not [90 – 94])
- Blessings of the Catechumens [95 – 97]
- Anointing of the Catechumens [98 – 103]
- Presentations {Optional} [104 – 105]
- Sending of the Catechumens for Election (a meeting with the Bishop of Catechumens from many Parishes throughout a Diocese) {Optional} [106 – 117]

An optional rite also pertains to this period for those who are baptized (candidates):

- Rite of Sending the Candidates for Recognition by the Bishop and for the Call to Continuing Conversion [434 – 445]

There is also a combined optional rite if there are both catechumens and candidates in a parish:

- Parish Celebration for Sending Catechumens for Election and Candidates for Recognition by the Bishop [530 – 546]

The conclusion of this period leads onto the Rite of Election or Enrollment of Names for those who are unbaptized and the Rite of Calling the Candidates to Continuing Conversion for those who are baptized. This is a very significant and important step in the Rite of Christian Initiation of Adults. It is usually celebrated on the first Sunday of Lent at the local diocesan cathedral, led by the local bishop. All of the Catechumens and Candidates, their Godparents (for Catechumens), and Sponsors (for Catechumens and Candidates) gather together on this day, which may involve hundreds of people. The Church formally ratifies the Catechumens' readiness for the Sacraments of Initiation and the Candidates' readiness to be received into full Communion with the Catholic Church. In turn the Catechumens – from now on known as the Elect – publicly acknowledge their desire to receive the Sacraments of Initiation, and the Candidates their desire to be received into full Communion with the Catholic Church.

==== Second Step: Election or Enrollment of Names [118 – 128] ====
The outline of this Rite is as follows [129 – 137]:

Liturgy of the Word

- Homily
- Presentation of the Catechumens
- Affirmation by the Godparents [and the Assembly]
- Invitation and Enrollment of Names
- Act of Admission or Election
- Intercessions for the Elect
- Prayer over the Elect
- Dismissal of the Elect

Liturgy of the Eucharist

This rite does not have to be a full Mass. In this case, there is no liturgy of the Eucharist, and thus no dismissal of the elect.

==== Rite of Calling the Candidates to Continuing Conversion [446 – 449] ====
The outline of this rite is as follows [450 – 458]:

Liturgy of the Word

- Homily
- Presentation of the Candidates for Confirmation and Eucharist
- Affirmation by the Sponsors [and the Assembly]
- Act of Recognition
- General Intercessions
- Prayer over the Candidates
- [Dismissal of the Assembly] – if the Eucharist is not to be celebrated

Liturgy of the Eucharist

==== Combined Rite [547 – 549] ====
Where there are both catechumens (unbaptized) and candidates (baptized) in a diocese there is the option of a combined rite at this stage. This rite is formally known as The (Combined) Celebration of the Rite of Election of Catechumens and the Call to Continuing Conversion of Candidates Who are Preparing for Confirmation and/or Eucharist or Reception into the Full Communion of the Catholic Church.

The outline of this rite is as follows [550 – 561]:

Celebration of Election

- Presentation of the Catechumens
- Affirmation by the Godparents [and the Assembly]
- Invitation and Enrollment of Names
- Act of Admission or Election

Celebration of the Call to Continuing Conversion

- Presentation of the Candidates
- Affirmation by the Sponsors [and the Assembly]
- Act of Recognition
- Intercessions for the Elect and the Candidates
- Prayer over the Elect and the Candidates
- Dismissal of the Elect

Liturgy of the Eucharist

=== Period of Purification and Enlightenment [138 – 149] ===
This period tends to correspond with Lent and is intended to be a period of increased discernment and coming closer to God. The aim of this period is to eliminate what is weak and sinful, and affirm what is holy. During this period the Elect undertake a number of Rites, including the Scrutinies and Presentations:

The outlines of these rites are as follows:

» First Scrutiny (3rd Sunday of Lent) [150 – 156]:

Liturgy of the Word

- Readings
- Homily
- Invitation to Private Prayer
- Intercessions for the Elect
- Exorcism
- Dismissal of the Elect

Liturgy of the Eucharist

» The Presentation of the Creed (3rd Week of Lent) [157 – 163]:

Liturgy of the Word

- Readings
- Homily
- Presentation of the Creed
- Prayer over the Elect
- Dismissal of the Elect

Liturgy of the Eucharist

» Second Scrutiny (4th Sunday of Lent) [164 – 170]:

Liturgy of the Word

- Readings
- Homily
- Invitation to Private Prayer
- Intercessions for the Elect
- Exorcism
- Dismissal of the Elect

Liturgy of the Eucharist

» Third Scrutiny (5th Sunday of Lent) [171 – 177]:

Liturgy of the Word

- Readings
- Homily
- Invitation to Private Prayer
- Intercessions for the Elect
- Exorcism
- Dismissal of the Elect

Liturgy of the Eucharist

» The Presentation of the Lord's Prayer (ideally the fifth Week of Lent) [178 – 184]:

Liturgy of the Word

- Readings
- Homily
- Gospel (Presentation of the Lord's Prayer)
- Homily
- Prayer over the Elect
- Dismissal of the Elect

Liturgy of the Eucharist

» Preparation Rites on Holy Saturday [185 – 192]:

  - Recitation of the Creed [193 – 196]
  - Ephphetha [197 – 199]
  - Choosing a Baptismal Name [200 – 202]
  - Concluding Rites [203 – 205]

The Candidates meanwhile prepare for the Sacrament of Reconciliation with an optional Penitential Rite Scrutiny [459 – 472]. This takes place on the second Sunday of Lent.

==== The Easter Vigil ====
At the Easter Vigil the celebration of the sacraments of initiation takes place, Baptism, Confirmation, and Holy Communion; according to the latest USCCB guidelines, this ceremony is to be reserved for Catechumens, so that no confusion will arise among the congregation about who is becoming a Christian (Catechumens) and who is merely being confirmed as a Catholic (Candidates). The guidelines also state that the formation process for Candidates—including its length—should be decided on a case-by-case basis and ideally conclude with a Confirmation at a regular Sunday Mass other than (and typically well before) Easter Vigil. At such a Mass, Candidates (having already been baptized) need only celebrate Confirmation and the Eucharist.

At the Easter Vigil, the Elect celebrate all of the sacraments of initiation; they are thereafter called Neophytes and they are considered to be full members of the Christian faithful. The Rites used to confer these Sacraments are outlined below. At some college campuses that have spring breaks during Holy Week, initiation for both the baptized and the unbaptized is often done during the weeks after Easter, so more of the community can be present.

==== Third Step: Celebration of the Sacraments of Initiation [206 – 217] ====
The Celebration of the Sacraments of Initiation is the Rite undertaken by the Elect (unbaptized).

The outline of this Rite is as follows [218 – 243]:

Liturgy of the Word

Celebration of Baptism

- Presentation of the Elect
- Invitation to Prayer
- Litany of the Saints
- Blessing of the Baptismal Waters
- Profession of Faith:

– Renunciation of Sin
- Profession of the Catholic Faith by the Catechumens and Candidates

- Baptism
- Explanatory Rites:
  - [Anointing after Baptism] – if Confirmation is separated from the Catechumen's Baptism
  - [Clothing with a Baptismal Garment] – optional
  - Presentation of a Lighted Candle

Celebration of Confirmation

- Invitation
- Laying on of Hands
- Anointing with Chrism

The confirmation can take place at the same time as the baptism, by anointing with the oil immediately after the pouring of the water.

Renewal of Baptismal Promises (at the Easter Vigil) for the congregation

- Invitation
- Renewal of Baptismal Promises:
  - Renunciation of Sin
  - Profession of Faith
- Sprinkling with Baptismal Water

Liturgy of the Eucharist

==== The Rite of Reception of Baptized Christians into the full Communion of the Catholic Church [473 – 486] ====
The Rite of Reception of Baptized Christians into the full Communion of the Catholic Church is the Rite undertaken by the Candidates (baptized).

The outline of this Rite (within Mass) is as follows [487 – 498]:

Liturgy of the Word

- Readings
- Homily

Celebration of Reception

- Invitation
- Profession of Faith
- Act of Reception
- [Confirmation]: – omitted if the Candidate has already been Confirmed
  - Laying on of Hands
  - Anointing with Chrism
- Celebrant's Sign of Welcome
- General Intercessions
- Sign of Peace

Liturgy of the Eucharist

==== The Combined Rite [562 – 565] ====
Where there are both Elect (unbaptized) and Candidates (baptized) in a Parish there is the option of a combined Rite at this stage. This Rite is formally known as The (Combined) Celebration at the Easter Vigil of the Sacraments of Initiation and of the Rite of Reception into the Full Communion of the Catholic Church.

The outline of this rite is as follows [566 – 594]:

Service of Light

Liturgy of the Word

Celebration of Baptism

- Presentation of the Elect
- Invitation to Prayer
- Litany of the Saints
- Prayer over the Water
- Profession of Faith:
  - Renunciation of Sin
  - Profession of Faith
- Baptism
- Explanatory Rites
  - [Anointing after Baptism] – if Confirmation is separated from the Catechumen's Baptism
  - [Clothing with a Baptismal Garment]- optional
  - Presentation of a Lighted Candle

Renewal of Baptismal Promises

- Invitation
- Renewal of Baptismal Promises:
  - Renunciation of Sin
  - Profession of Faith
- Sprinkling with Baptismal Water

Celebration of Reception

- Invitation
- Profession by the Candidates
- Act of reception

Celebration of Confirmation

- Invitation
- Laying on of Hands
- Anointing with Chrism

Liturgy of the Eucharist

== Application to post-baptismal formation ==
Some Catholic movements, like the Polish Light-Life movement, promote post-baptismal formation based on the OCIA. Similarly, the Knights of Columbus provides a free correspondence course under the Catholic Information Services (CIS) program.

== See also ==
- Catechism of the Catholic Church – Summary of doctrine of the Catholic Church
- Catechesis – Christian religious education
- Catholic laity – Ordinary members of the Catholic Church who are not clergy
- Light-Life Movement – Organisation within the Catholic Church
- Sacraments of initiation – Rites of initiation in Nicene Christianity
