= Fellowship of Catholic University Students =

U.S. Catholic outreach program

FOCUS Catholic
- Abbreviation: FOCUS
- Formation: January 1998; 28 years ago
- Founders: Curtis Martin; Edward Sri
- Type: Non-governmental organization
- Purpose: Catholic outreach to American university students and Catholic parishes
- Headquarters: Denver, Colorado
- Key people: Curtis Martin (CEO); Craig Miller (President); John Zimmer; John Flynn; Rev. Kevin Dyer, SJ; Drew Marsh; Dr. Edward Sri; Eileen Piper; David Bauer
- Staff: 1000+
- Website: www.focus.org

The Fellowship of Catholic University Students (FOCUS) is a Catholic lay apostolate founded in 1998 by Curtis Martin. The organization's work is primarily carried out through missionaries assigned to college campuses, though FOCUS also operates in some parish settings.

Through Bible studies, mentorship, conferences, retreats, mission trips, and partnerships with priests, bishops, and parishes, FOCUS missionaries walk alongside students and parishioners in their faith journey, inspiring and equipping them for a lifetime of Christ-centered evangelization and discipleship.

== History ==
FOCUS was founded by Curtis Martin and Edward Sri in 1998. The organization established its pilot program in January 1998 at Benedictine College in Atchison, Kansas, with two staff members and 24 students. That same year, Curtis Martin discussed the mission of the organization with Pope John Paul II. At the invitation of Archbishop Charles J. Chaput, former archbishop of Denver, a FOCUS program was established in the fall of 1998 at the University of Northern Colorado, Greeley. The organization is now headquartered outside of Denver.

The organization has grown significantly since its founding. As of 2025, FOCUS reported serving over 250 mission locations, including 211 domestic campuses, 10 international campuses, and 28 parishes, with over 1000 missionaries.

=== Founder ===
Curtis Martin holds a master's degree in Theology and is the author of the best-selling book Made for More, and co-host of the EWTN show Crossing the Goal. In 2004, Curtis and his wife Michaelann were awarded the Benemerenti Medal by Pope John Paul II for their outstanding service to the Church. In 2011, Curtis Martin was appointed as Consulter to the Pontifical Council for Promoting the New Evangelization by Pope Benedict XVI.

== Mission and Approach ==
The mission statement of FOCUS is to "know Christ Jesus and fulfill His Great Commission". How FOCUS does that is by sending missionaries to college campuses to encounter students and invite them into what they describe as a lifelong relationship with Jesus.

FOCUS recruits recent college graduates and provides training in pastoral ministry before assigning these missionaries to serve on college campuses, typically in teams of four. Missionaries generally make an initial two-year, full-time commitment with the organization. FOCUS operates with the approval of the local bishop and the support of the local pastor, as well as existing campus ministries.

The greater part of FOCUS' work occurs in Bible studies, conducted as small groups meeting weekly to discuss a Scripture passage, typically led by a missionary for the organization. The organization calls this small-group model "the method modeled by the master," that is, it purports to base its modes of evangelization on Jesus' actions in the Gospels. FOCUS Bible studies are either all-male or all-female. Meetings generally follow formats and lesson plans distributed by the organization and made available online. A Bible study leader will typically meet one-on-one with a couple of select members once a week outside of study sessions in what are called "discipleship" sessions.

Missionaries are typically recent graduates who have some experience with the organization's Bible studies as undergraduates, who dedicate two years of service on a campus with a FOCUS program. Missionaries, who make a living by fundraising salaries, undergo a five-week training program the summer prior to their assignments.

== Conferences and Events ==
Beginning in 1999, FOCUS began hosting its own conferences, featuring high-profile speakers, sponsors and exhibitors, and organized programming for students, young adults, and catechists. The organization developed two primary conferences, the larger SEEK conference and the smaller SLS (Student Leadership Summit). The larger of the two, SEEK, is largely educational and social in nature. The smaller Student Leadership Summit (SLS) was more directly aimed at training undergraduates and other young and ministerial professionals in the organization's methods.

The organization has hosted both conferences since 1999, with the final SLS held in 2019 and SEEK becoming annual. Due to the COVID-19 pandemic, the in-person 2021 and 2022 nationwide conferences were cancelled, prompting some universities to join together at common locations to watch livestreamed talks. In 2023, SEEK was again held in-person at The Dome at America's Center, where it returned for 2024 instead of changing locations like past years.

The organization also hosts service trips and retreats scheduled to coincide with typical undergraduate term breaks.

== Criticism and allegations of misconduct ==
In September and October 2026, Catholic writer and journalist Chris Damian published Deconstructing FOCUS Catholic, a series of articles and podcast interviews examining the organizational culture and practices of FOCUS. Drawing on accounts from former missionaries, employees, and organizational leaders, the series raised concerns about spiritual manipulation, psychological pressure, gender discrimination, purity culture, and the treatment of individuals experiencing mental health difficulties. Damian also reported allegations of abusive conduct involving FOCUS founder Curtis Martin and questioned the organization's handling of misconduct allegations against a missionary.

== Notable people ==
Michelle Duppong, a former FOCUS missionary who died of cancer in 2014, is under consideration for sainthood in the Catholic Church.

== See also ==
- Catholic spirituality
- Life Teen
- Saint Paul's Outreach
- NET Ministries
- Catholic Christian Outreach
