= Catholic Christian Outreach =

Canadian Catholic missionary organization

- Abbreviation: CCO
- Established: October 6, 1988; 38 years ago
- Founders: André and Angèle Regnier
- Purpose: Evangelization on Canadian University campuses
- Headquarters: Ottawa
- Region served: Canada
- Staff: 126 (2019)
- Website: cco.ca

Catholic Christian Outreach Canada (CCO) is a Catholic missionary organization that is present at several Canadian universities. It seeks to bring students into a personal relationship with Jesus Christ, equip them to live in the fullness of the Catholic faith, and build them up as leaders in evangelization.

CCO's Mission Statement: CCO is a Catholic movement raising up Christ-centred, Spirit-filled leaders to evangelize the world one person at a time. CCO’s mission, rooted on university campuses, includes alumni, parishes, dioceses, and other key church and global partners.

== History ==
CCO was founded in 1988 by André and Angèle Regnier at the University of Saskatchewan. The Regniers had participated in Evangelical activities with Campus Crusade for Christ at the University of Saskatchewan and were inspired by the zeal and devotion they found there, and they wanted to see a similar zeal within the Catholic Church. They found this zeal in the Catholic Charismatic Renewal, whose spiritual disposition they adopted in their approach to evangelization. They collaborated with their parish priest to develop CCO as a faith outreach program to bring this approach to Catholic university students, helping them to grow in their faith and learn to share it with others.

In 1992 CCO became an incorporated non-profit organization with its headquarters in Saskatoon; its headquarters moved to Ottawa in 2006.

=== Current campuses ===
CCO began with four missionaries at the University of Saskatchewan. As of April 2019 it had expanded to over 126 staff at headquarters and sixteen universities and has plans to expand by 20 campuses between 2008 and 2028.

British Columbia

Year	University	City
1998	Simon Fraser University	Vancouver, British Columbia
2008	University of British Columbia	Vancouver, British Columbia
2014	University of Victoria	Victoria, British Columbia

Alberta

Year	University	City
2010	University of Calgary	Calgary, Alberta
2014	Mount Royal University	Calgary, Alberta

Saskatchewan

Year	University	City
1988	University of Saskatchewan	Saskatoon, Saskatchewan

Manitoba

Year	University	City
2017	University of Winnipeg	Winnipeg, Manitoba

Ontario

Year	University	City
1997	Carleton University	Ottawa, Ontario
2000	University of Ottawa	Ottawa, Ontario
2007	Queen's University	Kingston, Ontario
2013	Ryerson University	Toronto, Ontario
2018	Trent University	Peterborough, Ontario
2021	Brock University	St. Catharines, Ontario

Quebec

Year	University	City
2016	Concordia University	Montreal, Quebec

Nova Scotia

Year	University	City
2004	Dalhousie University	Halifax, Nova Scotia
2010	Saint Mary's University	Halifax, Nova Scotia

Newfoundland and Labrador

Year	University	City
2015	Memorial University	St. John's, Newfoundland and Labrador

==== Former campuses ====
Year	University	City
1994	University of Regina	Regina, Saskatchewan
2003	Douglas College	Vancouver, British Columbia
2004	Capilano College	Vancouver, British Columbia
2009	Laval University	Quebec City, Quebec

== Methods and materials ==
Students involved with CCO lead and attend weekly faith studies on campus. These faith studies help students learn more about their faith and how they can live it out. The material references Scripture verses from the Bible, the Catechism of the Catholic Church, and other Christian writings. They also employ analogies, useful in sharing spiritual realities in common terms. The studies are intended to fuel discussion in a comfortable, small group setting. The five studies are called Discovery, Source, Growth, Trust, and Commission.

Another method of evangelism used by CCO is on-campus events for large groups of students. One-on-one ministry training and leadership opportunities are available. Students attend retreats, recreational events, and other social and prayer related activities as well.

CCO has created a booklet entitled The Ultimate Relationship which serves as an introduction to basic Christian faith. This booklet has been translated into over a dozen languages, and one million copies were printed and distributed at World Youth Day 2016 in Kraków, Poland.

== Rise Up ==
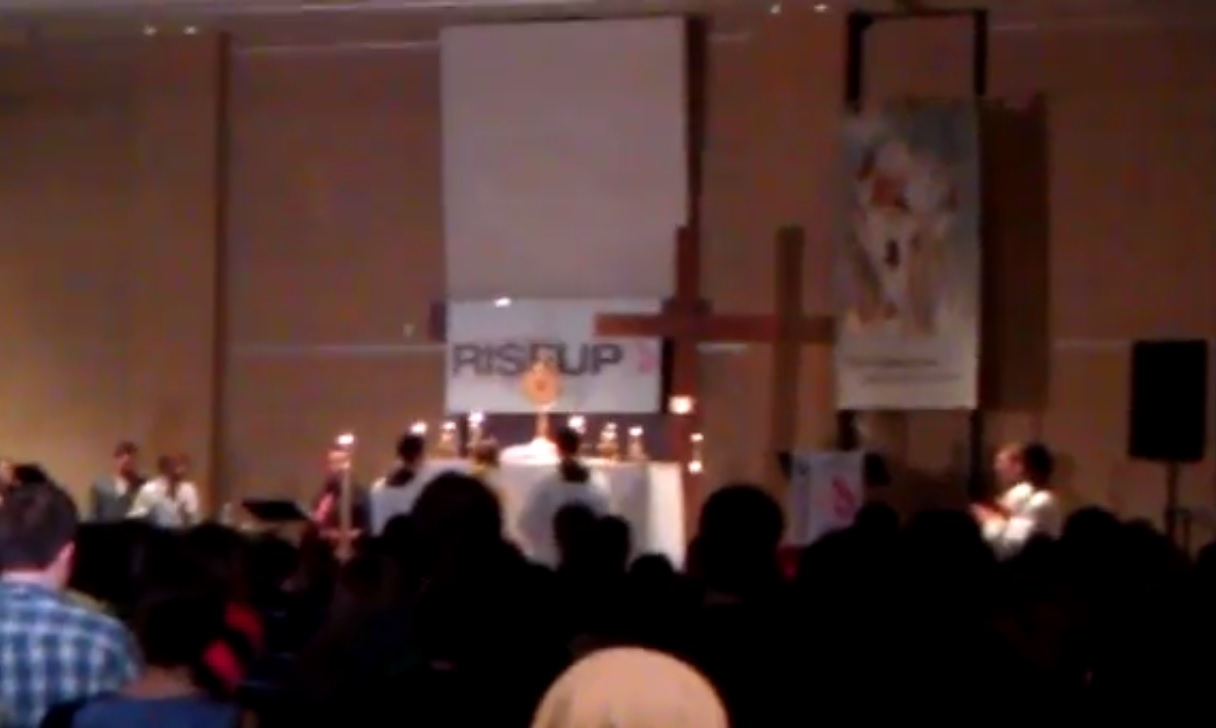
Eucharistic adoration at Rise Up 2011

CCO organizes an annual Christmas conference called "Rise Up". It is the second-largest Catholic conference for youth in Canada (behind Steubenville Toronto), and drew 850 participants to the 2013 conference in Ottawa.

Rise Up takes place every year from December 28 to January 1. It includes presentations, workshops, mass, live worship, adoration, reconciliation, and a New Year's banquet and dance. It is designed to deepen students' spiritual life and to motivate them to share their faith with others.

== Mission projects ==
CCO has facilitated several domestic and overseas missions throughout its existence, and has attended several World Youth Days.

=== IMPACT Canada ===
The annual IMPACT mission consists of students from across Canada gathering in one city for a summer of missionary work. Participants live in community and are assigned to teams at various parishes, where they lead faith studies and organize retreats and special events. Impact also features a weekly event called Cornerstone that involves skits, worship, testimonies, and Catholic teaching, a Courageous Catholic program that teaches people how to share their faith, and a monthly Summit event involving worship, Eucharistic adoration, and Reconciliation.

Impact Locations
Year	City
1999	Ottawa, Ontario
2002	Ottawa, Ontario
2004	Halifax, Nova Scotia
2007	Vancouver, British Columbia
2009	Saskatoon, Saskatchewan
2010	Calgary, Alberta
2011	Ottawa, Ontario
2012	Halifax, Nova Scotia
2014	Victoria, British Columbia
2015	Vancouver, British Columbia
2018	Vancouver, British Columbia

=== Other missions ===
Every Spring and Summer, CCO missionaries lead teams of students on foreign or domestic missions. The purpose of these trips is to help share the gospel in other areas, equip the locals on how to share their faith, and to build up the student participants in their confidence and love for Jesus.

=== Mission locations ===
Year	Region
2012	India
2012	Uganda
2014	Yukon
2015	British Columbia
2016	Brazil
2016	Poland
2016-19	Mexico
2017	Malaysia
2017-19	Honduras
2019	Cameroon
2019	St. John's, Newfoundland and Labrador
2019	New York City
2019	Panama
2019	Scotland
2022	Kelowna
2022	Belize
2022	Montreal
2023	Halifax
2023	Uganda
2023	Portugal

== See also ==
- Fellowship of Catholic University Students
- Saint Paul's Outreach
