= Light-Life Movement =

Organisation within the Catholic Church

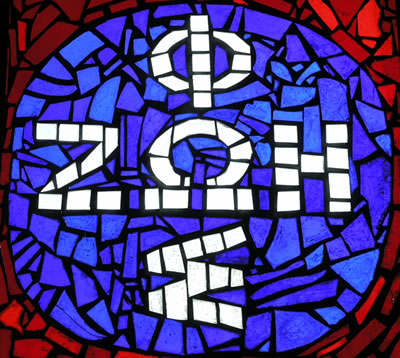
Stained-glass window with symbol of the movement, the Greek words for "Light" φως and "Life" ζωη

The Light-Life Movement, also known as the Oasis Movement, is an organisation within the Catholic Church. The group originated in Poland thanks to the efforts of Franciszek Blachnicki.

The Movement gathers together people of various ages and vocations. The family branch of the Movement, for married couples, is called the Domestic Church. Small groups of the members of the Movement usually form a community in a Catholic parish. Catholic priests work in the Movement as its "moderators" or directors. They are responsible for the spiritual formation of the members. The person responsible for the whole Movement is the General Moderator, currently Fr. Marek Sędek.

== History ==
The history of the Movement dates back to the first retreat, which took place in 1954 with the participation of altar boys. Before 1976 movement was known as "the Oasis Movement", "the Movement of the Living Church", "the Movement of the Immaculate." The creator of the oasis, the founder and first national moderator of the movement was Servant of God Fr. Franciszek Blachnicki (buried at the Church of the Good Shepherd in Krościenko), who died in 1987 in Germany where he worked after the beginning of the martial law in Poland. The Light-Life Movement has been founded and developed in Poland but it has already spread to other countries: Slovakia, the Czech Republic, Germany, Belarus, Latvia, Ukraine, Great Britain, Ireland, Canada, USA, Kenya, China and Pakistan. There are also small groups or communities in Norway, Sweden, Greece, France, Belgium, Luxemburg and Bulgaria. There are no exact figures released on the number of members of the Movement.

== Programme ==
Spirituality of the Light-Life Movement has been expressed in The Guideposts of the New Man. The formation programme is at the heart of the Movement and is based upon the document Order of Christian Initiation of Adults.

== See also ==
- Neocatechumenal Way
