= Franciszek Blachnicki =

Polish Catholic priest (1921–1987)

Venerable Franciszek Blachnicki
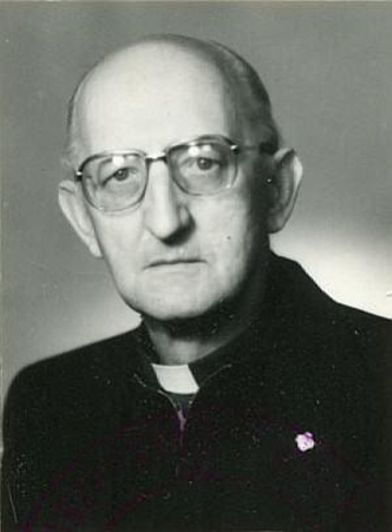

Priest
- Born: 24 March 1921; Rybnik, Second Republic of Poland
- Died: 27 February 1987 (aged 65); Carlsberg, Bad Dürkheim, Germany
- Cause of death: Assassination by poisioning
- Venerated in: Roman Catholic Church
- Patronage: Light-Life

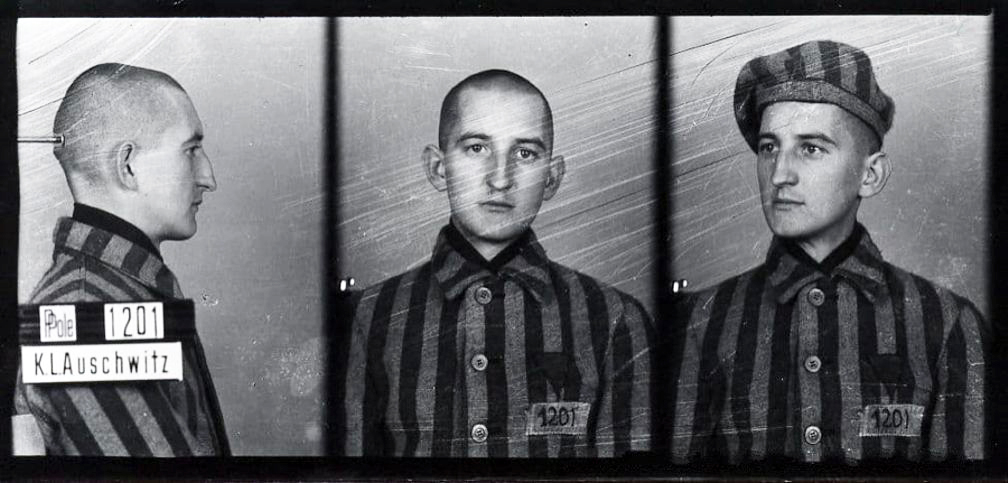
Franciszek Blachnicki as KL-Auschwitz prisoner, KL Number 1201, 1940

Franciszek Blachnicki (Polish: [franˈt͡ɕiʂɛɡ blaxˈɲit͡skʲi]; 24 March 1921 – 27 February 1987) was a Polish Roman Catholic priest and the founder of the Light-Life movement, also known as the Oasis Movement, and the Secular Institute of the Immaculate Mother of the Church.

He founded several other movements and religious congregations that would address a range of social and ethical issues. These issues included anti-alcoholism and human rights. His movements first came about after starting out as simple retreats designed for both altar servers and families that later began to address a series of issues in Poland at the time. His concern for human rights came during the communist era in Poland as well as his experiences as a prisoner of war during World War II in which he was incarcerated in Auschwitz and other concentration camps under the German Nazi regime.

Blachnicki's beatification process opened in Poland in the 1990s and he became titled as a Servant of God upon the cause's commencement. The decisive moment in the process came on 30 September 2015 after Pope Francis confirmed his heroic virtue and titled him as Venerable.

== Life ==
Franciszek Blachnicki was born on 24 March 1921 in Upper Silesia (then Germany) as the seventh-born child to Józef Blachnicki and Maria Miller. He had at least one brother.

He finished school in 1938. In September 1939 he participated in the campaign to fight against the invading German armed forces at the outbreak of World War II. But his involvement in this campaign led to the Gestapo arresting him on 24 June 1940 that saw an investigation and Blachnicki thrown into the notorious German Auschwitz concentration camp as prisoner 1201. He was later transferred on 19 September 1941 to a prison in Zabrze and later to Katowice where a further investigation into the charges against him was launched. On 30 March 1942 he was sentenced to death for having conspired against the Nazi regime and was scheduled to be beheaded at the guillotine. But something profound happened to him in his cell on 17 June 1942: he experienced a sudden conversion of faith in God in which he felt closer to Him and decided to dedicate his life to Him.

But on 14 August 1942 he was pardoned and his death sentence was changed to a decade in prison which would take effect whenever the war ended. However this never happened since on 17 April 1945 he and the entire Lengenfeld camp were liberated after the arrival of United States soldiers.

Blachnicki decided then to pursue the priesthood and so made an application on 6 August 1945 to commence his ecclesial education in Kraków. He obtained good results during this period from 1945 to 1950 and was interested in catechetics and liturgics.

He received his solemn ordination to the priesthood on 25 June 1950 in the Saints Peter and Paul church in Katowice from Bishop Stanisław Adamski. In 1951 he held a retreat for altar servers at Lubliniec and created the first retreat for children around that time. But a retreat for children from 10 to 14 August 1952 for the first time used the name "Oasis for the Children of God". The first such retreat under this name for altar servers would be held in Bibiela in 1954. The communist crackdown on religion saw Silesian bishops ejected from the diocese Blachnicki was in from 1952 until 1956. This prompted him to work for a secret underground diocesan curia which put him into conflict with the diocese's vicar capitular Jan Piskorz.

On 8 September 1957 he began a national anti-smoking and anti-drinking campaign that was later named as the "Crusade of Temperance" on 10 August 1958; this work encouraged abstinence which could be offered to God as expiation for those addicted to drinking. But this campaign put him into direct conflict with the communist authorities who continued to harass him for this. On August 29, 1960, the campaign's offices were raided and Blachnicki was arrested and charged with having conducted illegal activities. He was given a ten-month jail term which was suspended for three sometime later. In summer 1961 the Katowice curia allowed for him to enter the college in Lublin for further theological studies. He began his time there in October 1961 and taught there from 1964 to 1972 during which time he published about 100 works. In 1976 he founded the Lumière et Vie movement.

The retreats that he led would later transform into the Light-Life movement which had also become known as the Oasis Movement. He had based the movement on the renewal of the Second Vatican Council while taking inspiration from the document Gaudium et Spes. He also founded a religious congregation of nuns in the late 1950s. The first retreat for families was prepared in 1973 and this began the development of the Domestic Church branch of the movement.

Blachnicki left for Rome on 10 December 1981 to help the Servant of God Luigi Giussani work on the Congress of the Renewal Movements but could not return to Poland due to the imposition of martial law. This forced him to settle in Carlsberg where he settled in the Polish center known as "Marianum". In 1980 he founded the Union of Priests of Christ Servant and on 17 June 1982 founded the Christian Service of the Liberation of Nations to support human rights and encourage Christian activism.

Blachnicki's sudden death in 1987 was ruled as an embolism. Pope John Paul II sent an official telegram of condolence upon learning of Blachnicki's death and in it referred to Blachnicki as "an ardent apostle of inner renewal and conversion". The pope further praised him for his insight into social and ethical issues and for his "specific charisma". In 1994 he was granted the posthumous award of the Commander's Cross of the Order of Polonia Restituta and in 1995 was granted the posthumous award of the Auschwitz Cross Medal. On 1 April 2000 his remains were relocated to the church of the Good Shepherd in Krościenko.

From 2001 to 2005 an investigation was launched into his death with investigators concluding that it was possible – though no actual proof was submitted – that communist authorities poisoned him. In October 2020 with the agreement of the Church, his body was exhumed by the Institute of National Remembrance to allow a forensic autopsy. In March 2023, Minister of Justice and Public Prosecutor General Zbigniew Ziobro announced that Blachnick's death was caused by a further unspecified toxin, confirming that he died of a poisoning.

== Beatification process ==
The beatification process opened on 21 April 1995 and Blachnicki became titled as a Servant of God after the Congregation for the Causes of Saints issued the "nihil obstat" edict that allowed for the cause to be launched. The diocesan process was inaugurated in Katowice on 9 December 1995 and was closed on 25 November 2001 at which point the C.C.S. validated the process on 29 November 2002 in Rome.

The postulation later compiled the Positio dossier which detailed his life and reputation for holiness; this dossier was submitted to officials in the C.C.S. on 27 February 2013. Theologians approved the cause on 16 October 2014 while the C.C.S. members confirmed the cause later on 22 September 2015. The decisive moment for the process came on 30 September 2015 after he was named as Venerable after Pope Francis recognized that Blachnicki had lived a model Christian life of heroic virtue.

The current postulator for this cause is Bishop Adam Wodarczyk.

== See also ==
- Light-Life
