= Dale Fushek =

American ex-Catholic founder of Life Teen organization

- Born: 1952 (age 73–74); Cleveland, Ohio, United States
- Education: St. John's Seminary, California; University of Notre Dame
- Known for: Co-founder of Life Teen
- Criminal charge: Misdemeanor assault
- Criminal penalty: $250 fine

Ecclesiastical career
- Religion: Christianity
- Church: Roman Catholic Church
- Ordained: 1978
- Laicized: 2010
- Congregations served: St. Jerome's Parish, Phoenix; St. Timothy's Catholic Parish, Mesa
- Offices held: Vicar general for the Diocese of Phoenix (2000–2004)

Dale Fushek (born 1952) is the founder of Life Teen, the leader of the Praise and Worship Center in Chandler, Arizona, and the former Vicar General of the Roman Catholic Diocese of Phoenix. In 2005 he was charged with ten criminal misdemeanor counts related to alleged sexual contact with teenage boys and young men. By February 2010, the charges were adjusted to four counts contributing to the delinquency of a minor and one count of indecent exposure. On April 15, 2010, Fushek agreed to a plea bargain offered by the Maricopa County Attorney's Office in which he pleaded guilty to one of the charges. The four other charges were dropped and he was fined $250, in addition to being sentenced to 364 days of probation.

On December 15, 2008, the Diocese of Phoenix announced that Fushek had been excommunicated by Bishop Thomas J. Olmsted for establishing the Praise and Worship Center, a community outside the Catholic Church, in defiance of the bishop's order for him to cease ministry.

== Early religious education ==
Fushek was born in Cleveland, Ohio, in 1952. His family moved to Phoenix, Arizona, in the 1960s. After graduating from Phoenix Central High School in 1970, he attended St. John's Seminary in California. In 1978 he was ordained a priest in the Roman Catholic Diocese of Phoenix. In 1984 he received his Master of Theology/Liturgy from the University of Notre Dame.

== Ministry as Catholic priest ==
As a young priest, Fushek was assigned to St. Jerome's Parish in Phoenix. There he began to work toward bringing children and especially teens back into the ministry and founded Active Christian Teens (ACT). ACT sought to expand the ministry to teens and young adults.

In 1983 Fushek was transferred to St. Timothy's Catholic Parish in Mesa, Arizona. There, he was one of three founders of Life Teen, a program similar to ACT at St. Jerome's. The program Fushek developed for teens proved extremely popular and numerous other parishes and dioceses began to develop Life Teen programs of their own. Fushek is no longer involved in Life Teen as of his resignation in 2005.

Fushek was instrumental in planning and organizing the 1987 visit of Pope John Paul II to Phoenix, and also the 1989 visit of Mother Teresa. On April 19, 2000, Fushek was appointed one of two vicars general for the Diocese of Phoenix, by Bishop Thomas O'Brien. On February 15, 2002, Fushek was named a monsignor.

=== Allegations of sexual misconduct ===
In May 2002, Fushek disclosed to his congregation that in 1995 the Diocese of Phoenix had settled a sexual harassment suit that had been filed against him by a former Life Teen staff member. In April 2004, Bishop Thomas Olmsted, who had been installed the previous December, accepted Fushek's resignation as Vicar General. In late December 2004, additional complaints against Fushek emerged and the Diocese of Phoenix began to conduct an investigation. Fushek was placed on paid administrative leave shortly thereafter and his priestly faculties were suspended.

On January 27, 2005, a lawsuit was filed in Maricopa County Superior Court alleging that Fushek witnessed a sexual assault committed by a priest and did nothing, and in April of that year Fushek resigned effective June 30 as a Priest of St. Timothy's Catholic Church. The suit, settled by the Diocese of Phoenix for $100,000 in December, does not imply any admission of guilt, and was dismissed with prejudice.

Fushek was arrested on November 21, 2005, and charged with ten criminal misdemeanor counts related to alleged sexual contact with teens and young adults. The charges included three counts of misdemeanor assault, five of contributing to the delinquency of a minor and two of indecent exposure. The number of counts was reduced to seven when one of the victims died. A lengthy appellate process ensued when Fushek's lawyers argued that he was entitled to a jury trial on the remaining counts as opposed to one or more bench trials. The Supreme Court of Arizona upheld the argument.

=== Laicization ===
In February 2010, the Diocese of Phoenix announced that based on an investigation by the Congregation for the Doctrine of the Faith, Pope Benedict XVI approved a "decree of dismissal" laicizing Fushek. According to church law, the congregation is responsible for addressing "sexual sins" perpetrated by priests and deacons against minors. Fushek chose not to participate or defend himself in the process.

On April 15, 2010, Fushek pleaded guilty to one count of misdemeanor assault. Fushek was sentenced to 364 days of probation and fined $250. Four other charges were dropped. The plea agreement eliminated the need for other alleged victims to testify at a trial.

== Praise and Worship Center ==
In late 2007, Fushek and former priest Mark Dippre established a non-denominational Christian assembly called the Praise and Worship Center. Services started at Thanksgiving 2007 and have attracted between 500 and 700 people to the Center in Chandler, Arizona.

According to its website, the Center strives "to bring together people of all traditions who are willing to follow the person of Jesus Christ and form a non-judgmental community of faith." In addition, "there are no doctrinal guidelines or mandated acceptance of proscribed theology required for membership."

On January 4, 2008, the Arizona Republic reported that the Diocese of Phoenix had urged Catholics not to attend Fushek's services.

=== Excommunication ===
On December 15, 2008, the Bishop of Phoenix, Thomas J. Olmsted, issued a decree of excommunication against Fushek and Dippre. A statement issued by the Diocese of Phoenix said that Fushek and Dippre incurred the censure of excommunication because they chose to be in schism with the Catholic Church by establishing and leading an opposing ecclesial community known to the public as the Praise and Worship Center. Both priests consistently refused to comply with explicit directions by Bishop Olmsted to discontinue engaging in public ministry.

The Diocese indicated that the excommunications were incurred after repeated offers of reconciliation were ignored. The decree of excommunication by Bishop Olmsted declares that Fushek and Dippre have brought the censure upon themselves. As excommunicated priests, Fushek and Dippre cannot participate in the celebration of the sacrifice of the Holy Eucharist or in any other ceremonies of worship. They are also prohibited from celebrating or receiving any of the sacraments. In addition, they forfeit the benefits of dignity, office, or any function that they had previously acquired in the Catholic Church.

Shortly after the announcement, Life Teen president Randy Raus stated, "We're praying for him, but we stand behind Bishop Olmsted and the diocese in this decision."

== Autobiography ==
In March 2011, Fushek published an autobiography, The Unexpected Life: An Autobiography of a Very Human Priest.

== See also ==
- Roman Catholic sex abuse cases
