= Life Teen =

Catholic youth ministry organization

Life Teen, Inc.
- Founded at: Mesa, AZ
- Headquarters: Mesa, AZ Atlanta, GA St. Louis, MO
- Official language: English, Spanish
- President & CEO: Randy Raus
- Vice President & CIO: Mark Hart
- Website: lifeteen.com

Life Teen is a Catholic youth ministry organization in the United States.

== Overview ==
Life Teen's mission statement explains, "As a Eucharist-centered movement within the Roman Catholic Church, Life Teen leads teenagers and their families into a deeper relationship with Jesus Christ and His Church".

Life Teen provides parish-based programs. The Life Teen program for high-school teenagers is used by over 1,800 Catholic parishes in 24 countries, across North America, Central America, South America, Europe, Asia and Africa.

In 2003, they launched the Edge program for middle-school pupils, which was used by almost 1,000 parishes in 10 countries. As of 2005, over 100,000 high-school-aged Catholics in the US attended Life Teen each week.

== History ==
Life Teen was established in 1985 at St. Timothy's Parish in Mesa, Arizona. The founder and then-priest Dale Fushek said he believed the Church needed a new approach to evangelize Christ to the Catholic youth in the area. Fushek was later excommunicated when he opened a non-denominational, Protestant-oriented worship center in the Phoenix area. He was ultimately laicized by the Church in 2010 following allegations that he had sexually abused teenage boys and young men.

Though Life Teen is present in fewer than 10% of American parishes, more than 40% of American seminarians had some connection to the program during their teenage years.

== Organization ==
Life Teen is headed by a five-member administrative team including President and CEO Randy Raus, Executive Vice President and Chief Information Officer Mark Hart, Vice President of Ministry Advancement Steve Allgeyer, Vice President of Parish Services Joel Stepanek, and Vice President of Missions and Operations Jason Ball.

Its 23-member board of directors includes Bishop Everard De Jong, Bishop James Wall, four priests, and several laities from around the country.

== Ministry model ==
Life Teen helps Youth Ministers and adult program leaders, known as Core members, minister to young Catholics in a parish setting. Teenagers typically attend a Sunday Mass specifically intended for their families and other interested parishioners. Music and homilies are focused on teenagers, who are invited to be trained in approved liturgical roles such as lectors, ushers, altar servers, greeters, and Extraordinary ministers of Holy Communion. Following Mass, a "Life Night", which incorporates teaching in Catholic beliefs, interactive activities, and socialization, is held.

Many Life Teen Programs hold events such as Bible study and other social events. Life Teen and Edge programs are encouraged to host two weekend-long retreats for members throughout the year.

=== Mass ===
Life Teen holds youth-focused masses, which it says are the most important part of its program. Particular efforts are made to create a welcoming atmosphere, reverent and relevant music, and an engaging homily that speaks to the issues in teens' lives. The music ranges from traditional Catholic hymns, sometimes with a modern arrangement, to Catholic worship songs. Life Teen has a transcription of a video talk by Fr. Robert Schreiner explaining the role of music within Liturgy.

=== Life Nights ===
Following the Mass are gatherings that are aimed to be enjoyable and to challenge teenagers to deepen their relationships with God and to learn about the Catholic faith. Known as Life Nights, the gatherings consist of four segments; Gather, Proclaim, Break, and Send, which are derived from the flow of the Mass.

Life Nights consist of catechetical issue and social nights. Catechetical nights are designed to teach teenagers about aspects of the Catholic faith, issue nights deal with real-life issues such as gossip, chastity, and drinking, and social nights are designed to help teenagers build friendships and strengthen social bonds.

=== Core values ===
Life Teen promotes seven core values.

- Eucharistic spirituality - focuses on the Mass and receiving Christ in the Eucharist.
- Love - Life Teen strives to show attendees of the Mass or a program offered that they are loved.
- Joy - according to Life Teen; "Jesus is a reason to be joyful and excited about life"
- Affirmation - As a community, participants in Life Teen are expected to support and encourage one another.
- Authenticity - Life Teen encourages teenagers to live an authentic life in which they do not wear a "mask" or pretend to be someone they are not.
- Evangelization - Life Teen believes "every teenager deserves a chance to have a relationship with Jesus" and invites all to participate.
- Primary vocation - The adult leaders of Life Teen are called to take care of their primary responsibilities ahead of their commitments to Life Teen or any other purpose.

== Additional programs ==
In addition to high school youth ministry, Life Teen has been expanded to other areas of ministry. It offers training events, summer camps, youth rallies, and conferences.

=== Summer camps ===
Life Teen operates summer camps at Camp Hidden Lake in Dahlonega, Georgia, and Camp Covecrest in Tiger, Georgia. The camps are designed to build friendships, allow attendees to have fun, and deepen their faith through prayer and experiencing the sacraments.

Camp activities include games and outdoor activities.

The camps also encourage and assist teens to develop a deeper relationship with Christ. In addition to the Mass, attendees can partake in the sacrament of Reconciliation, listen to speakers, and praise and worship music, and attend Eucharistic adoration.

=== St. John Paul II Center for the New Evangelization ===
In 2012, Bishop Pierre-André Dumas asked Life Teen to build a base on diocesan land in Madian, Haiti. He tasked Life Teen with bringing Catholic youth ministry to the Diocese of Anse-à-Veau et Miragoâne. The base currently serves teenagers in the area through Bible studies, Life Nights, and discipleship. The base brings together both Haitian and American missionaries.

== See also ==
- Catholic spirituality
- Fellowship of Catholic University Students
- Universal call to holiness
- Vocational Discernment in the Catholic Church
- World Youth Day
