= Movement of the Word of God =

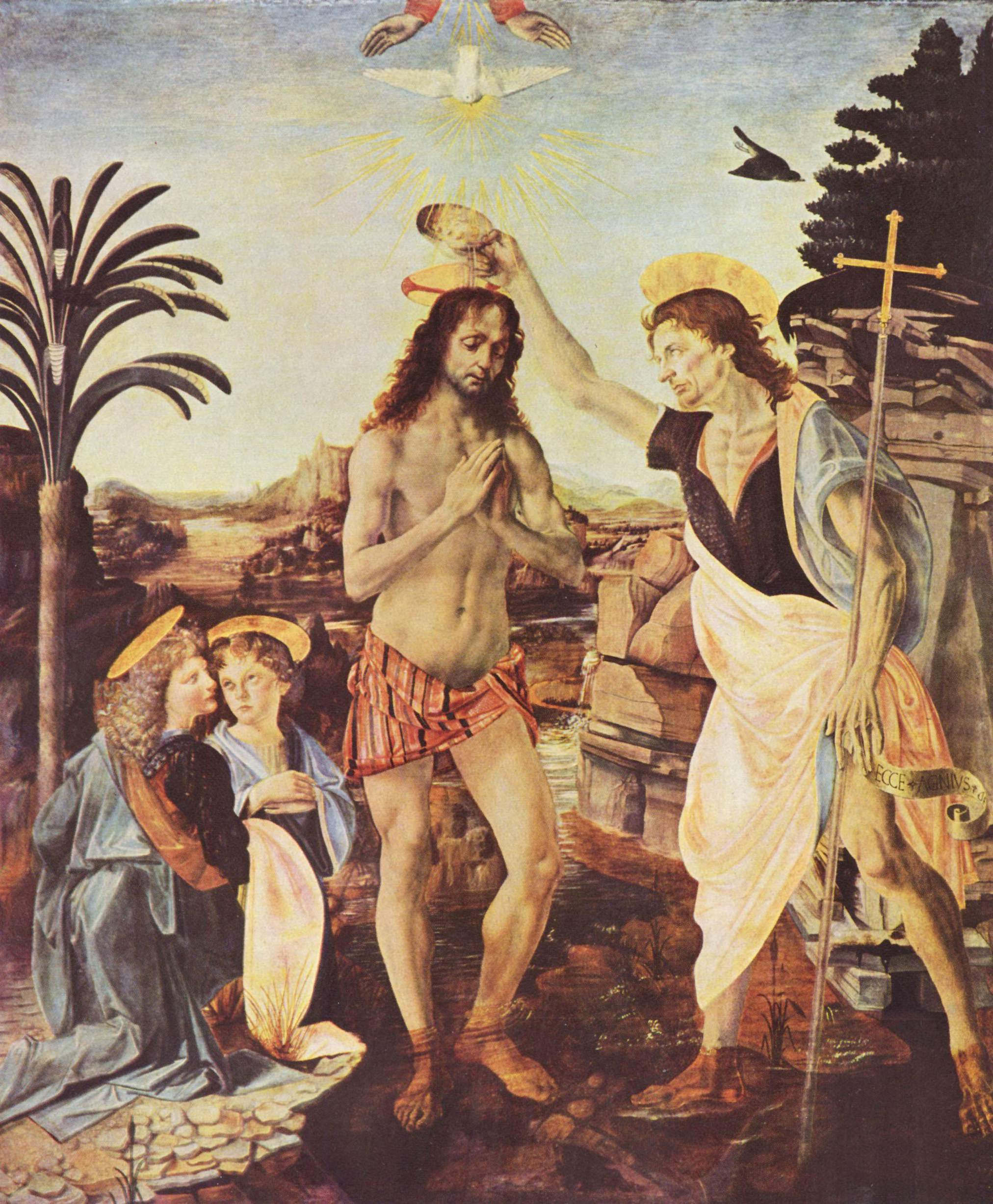
The Baptism of Christ is the symbol of The Movement of the Word of God

The Movement of the Word of God, also called Work of God the Father, is a pastoral community of disciples, a lay ecclesial movement within the Roman Catholic Church.

Is defined itself as "a Catholic Community organized out of the pastoral charism of the Gospel, and consecrated to evangelizing the desert of the world and to developing the Civilization of Love on Earth."

It is an ecclesial movement of evangelical renewal and of evangelization with diverse types of members, commitments and services. It seeks to participate, within the Catholic Church, of the Ecumenism of Love with all the men and women of good will, collaborating with everything that is true, noble and just. Thus seeking the union of all men, peoples and nations over their differences so that all, without distinction can, through Christ, have access to God in the Spirit of his Love."

Their fundamental mission is to evangelize, seeking to develop the Civilization of Love through the salvation communities, under Jesus' Lordship over the world.

It's an ecclesial Movement of evangelical renewal and evangelization, which finds itself alluded to in the spirit of Paul VI´s document Evangelii Nuntiandi and in the Second Vatican Council, when it states: "Christ the Lord, by the Holy Spirit, at the same time raises up in the Church institutes which take as their own special task the duty of preaching the Gospel, a duty belonging to the whole Church" (cf Ad Gentes, 23).

== Identity of the Movement ==
In 1976 the first youth prayer groups became aware that their identity arose from the Word of God, sought as lifestyle with the anointing of the Holy Spirit.

The inspiration of a short Course of Evangelization, received by the founder of the Movement, Fr. Ricardo Martensen, was a decisive grace for the groups. The "Cursillo I" ( a kind of spiritual retreat), carried out in January 1976, sealed the identity and founded the spirituality of the Word of God as a lifestyle. This led to the awareness of its identity as The Movement of the Word of God.

In 1980, Bishop Fr. Jorge Novak, welcomed the Movement in the diocese of Quilmes (Province of Buenos Aires, Argentina) and in 1982 he gave the first canonical approval to the Movement and his statutes (ad experimentum).

The "Cursillo", acted as a bridge between the original charism received in those groups and the newness of The Movement of the Word of God, as a movement of evangelical renewal in the Church. Their identity was ecclesiastically confirmed later on, with the definitive canonical approval of the Statutes, received on August 11, 1988.

"By their nature, charisms are communicative, and give rise to that 'spiritual affinity between persons' (cf. Christifideles Laici, 24) and that friendship in Christ which is the origin of 'movements'. The passage from the original charism to the movement happens through the mysterious attraction that the founder holds for all those who become involved in his spiritual experience" (John Paul II, address on Pentecost Eve, 05/30/98).

== Charism ==
The Charism of the Movement is: "To announce the Gospel from the Covenant of brotherly love, building disciple communities of salvation, under Jesus' Lordship"

The peculiar thing about The Movement of the Word of God is a charism for reading and announcing the Word of God translating it into a significant and testimonial lifestyle. Such an announcement leads to the encounter and the experience of the true and living God of Revelation, who calls to conversion to a life surrendered and reconciled to God, and of brotherly love and community covenant among believers.

From the beginning, what would later be called the charism of the Work arose from grace as a wish to live Jesus' Gospel in present time, with the fidelity of the Acts of the Apostles and the first Christian communities.

This charism is:

1- Evangelizing To announce Jesus kerygma-tically and charismatically as Savior and Lord, and to announce the eternal Life of his Gospel.

2- Community building Developing the covenant of brotherly love in the community and of God's universal love for all men and women. From the beginning, the charism was lived as a communicational and dynamic spirituality, fit for urban life. God becomes present when the grace of prayer is shared and in the charity of interpersonal relationships, as well as in the testimony of the atmosphere of brotherly love in the group encounters.

3- Pastoral Priests, laymen and laywomen, in communion with the hierarchical Church, work at organizing communities like those in Acts 2:42-47 and 4:32-37, developing full pastoral care over personal and community life in the light of discernment.

4- Civilizing Being a thoroughly evangelizing charism, it is also a civilizing charism that seeks to build up Salvation communities, so as to give origin to civilizing offshoots of a New World, thus serving the needs of society.
