= Pierre-André Dumas =

Haitian Catholic bishop

- Bishop of Anse-à-Veau and Miragoâne
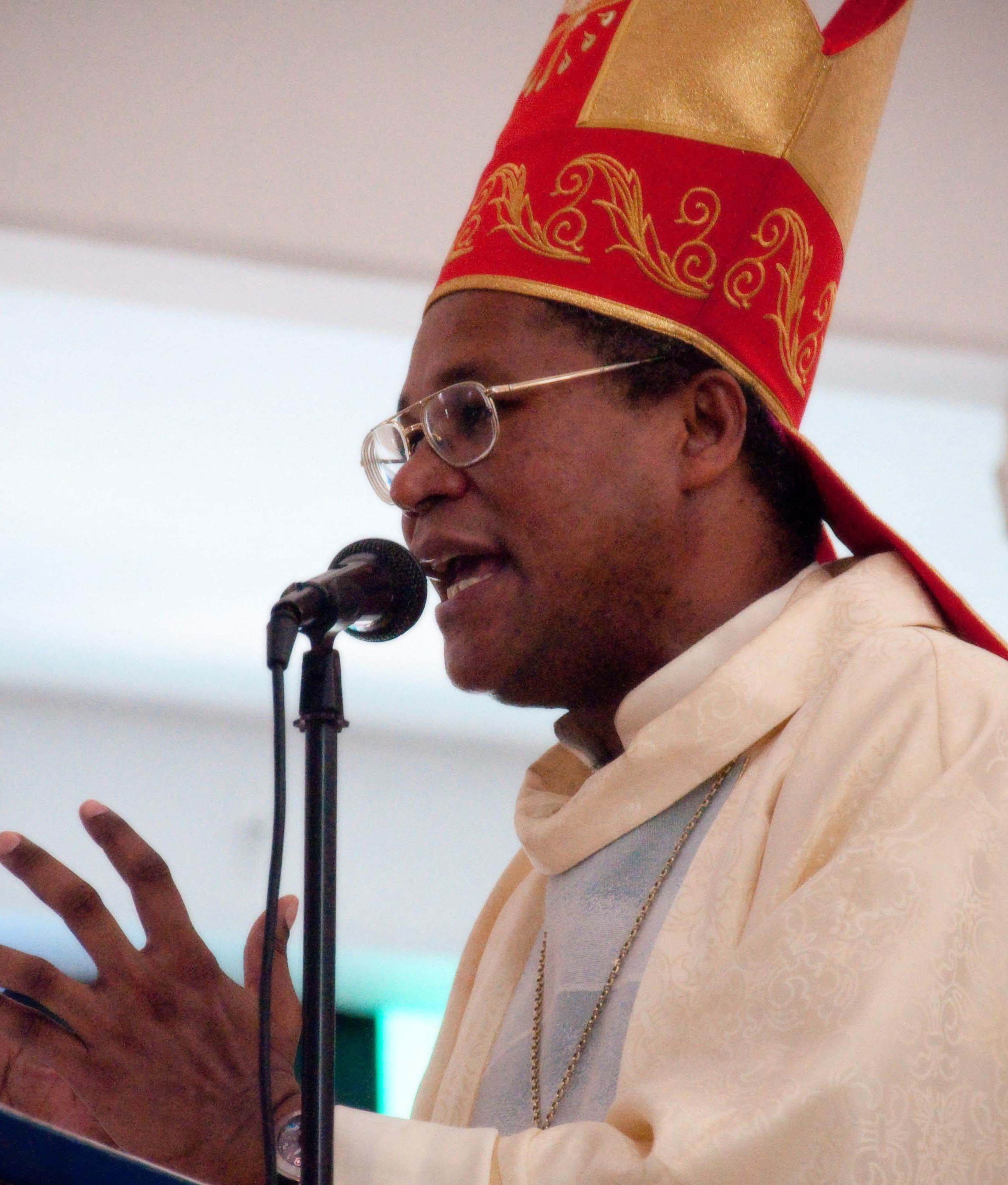
- Church: Catholic Church
- Diocese: Diocese of Anse-à-Veau and Miragoâne
- Appointed: 13 July 2008
- Predecessor: Diocese erected
- Previous posts: Titular Bishop of Floriana (2002-2008); Auxiliary Bishop of Port-au-Prince (2002-2008)

Orders
- Ordination: 26 May 1991 by Pope John Paul II
- Consecration: 22 February 2003 by Roger Etchegaray

Personal details
- Born: 26 September 1962 (age 63) Saint-Jean-du-Sud, Sud, Republic of Haiti

Pierre-André Dumas (born 26 September 1962 in Saint-Jean-du-Sud) is a Haitian Catholic prelate who has served as Bishop of Anse-à-Veau and Miragoâne since 2008. He was ordained in 1991.

On 18 February 2024, the bishop was seriously wounded in an explosion in Port-au-Prince. The reasons for the explosion are unclear, though police suspected an accident caused by a gas leak. Speaking to Aid to the Church in Need, Archbishop Max Leroy Mesidor of Port-au-Prince, and President of the Bishops Conference in Haiti, said the blast caused serious burns to Monsignor Dumas’ face, arms, and legs.
