= Seek (conference) =

Catholic conference for young adults

- 2025 logo
- Status: Active
- Location: Varies
- Inaugurated: 1999
- Most recent: 2025
- Attendance: 21,000+ (2025)
- Organizer: Fellowship of Catholic University Students
- Website: seek.focus.org

Seek (stylized as SEEK) is an annual Catholic young adult conference organized by Fellowship of Catholic University Students. The conference is among the largest regular gatherings of Catholics in the world.

The most recent conference, held January 1–5, 2025, was held concurrently in Salt Lake City, Utah, Washington, D.C., and Cologne, Germany. Over 21,000 people attended, including 46 Catholic bishops. Speakers at Seek have included Charles J. Chaput, Benedict Groeschel, Mike Schmitz, Jim Caviezel, Jason Evert, Arthur C. Brooks, Tammy Peterson, and Oscar Solis.

== History ==
The conference had previously been called the FOCUS National Student Leadership Conference. Prior to the COVID-19 pandemic, Seek had been held biennially. The 2004 conference, keynoted by Jim Caviezel, was held in Denver, Colorado. The 2008 conference was held in Grapevine, Texas. The 2010 conference took place in Orlando, Florida, and was attended by about 3,500 college students.

The last in-person national conference prior to the pandemic was held in 2019, in Indianapolis, Indiana. Seek resumed in-person in 2023 at The Dome at America's Center in St. Louis, Missouri; around 17,000 people attended. Seek 2024 was again held at The Dome in St. Louis, and was attended by about 24,000 people. The main venue of the 2025 conference was the Salt Palace, in Salt Lake City, Utah. It was the first time that the conference had been held in Utah, and the first time that a satellite session was held in Washington, D.C. 17,000 people attended the Salt Lake City location.

In 2025, The Pillar reported that in order to accommodate the large number of participants, planning for the liturgies at Seek begins over a year and a half in advance of the conference. Seek 2026 is scheduled to be held in Denver, Colorado, Columbus, Ohio, and Fort Worth, Texas.

== See also ==
- 10th National Eucharistic Congress
