= Foreign relations of Bangladesh =

The foreign relations of Bangladesh are Bangladesh's relationships with foreign countries. The Government of Bangladesh's policies pursue a moderate foreign policy that heavily relies on multilateral diplomacy, especially at the United Nations (UN) and the World Trade Organization (WTO). Since its independence in 1971, Bangladesh has stressed its principle of "Friendship to all, malice towards none" in dictating its diplomacy. As a member of the Non-Aligned Movement, Bangladesh has tended to not take sides with major powers. Since the end of the Cold War, Bangladesh has pursued better relations with its neighbours and other nearby states.

The Bangladeshi government has begun to implement a foreign policy that pursues regional economic integration in South Asia and aims to establish Bangladesh as a regional hub of transit trade in Asia. Bangladesh has established official diplomatic relations with most of the members of the United Nations as well as some non-UN members like Palestine. Relations with these nations are largely cordial except for some bilateral disputes with Myanmar and Pakistan. Issues with India stem from Teesta and other river water sharing and border killings.

== Policy ==
The foreign policy of Bangladesh consists of various strategies chosen by the Constitution and government of the country to safeguard its national interests and to achieve goals from its place on the world stage. The Bangladeshi Ministry of Foreign Affairs formulates and executes the policies according to the guidance from the relevant section of the Constitution of Bangladesh.

The fundamental principles of foreign policies of Bangladesh originate from Article 25 of the Constitution of Bangladesh:

"The State shall base its international relations on the principles of respect for national sovereignty and equality, non-interference in the internal affairs of other countries, peaceful settlements of international disputes, and respect for international law and the principles enunciated in the United Nations Charter, and on the basis of those principles shall-

- Strive for the renunciation of the use of force in international relations and for general and complete disarmament;
- Uphold the right of every people freely to determine and build up its own social, economic and political system by ways and means of its own free choice; and
- Support oppressed peoples throughout the world waging a just struggle against imperialism, colonialism or racialism."

== Participation in multilateral organisations ==
=== Commonwealth of Nations ===
Bangladesh, which was part of the British Raj until 1947, joined the Commonwealth of Nations in 1972 after its establishment as an independent nation in 1971 from Pakistan. It has actively participated in the Heads of Government conferences that take place bi-annually.

=== United Nations ===
Bangladesh was admitted to the United Nations in 1974 and was elected to a Security Council term in 1978–1980 and again for a 2000–2002 term. Foreign Minister Mr. Humayun Rasheed Choudhury served as president of the 41st UN General Assembly in 1986.

In recent years, Bangladesh has played a significant role in international peacekeeping operations. In 2021, nearly 10,000 Bangladeshi military personnel were deployed overseas on peacekeeping operations, making it the single largest contributor to the UN peacekeeping forces. Under UN auspices, Bangladeshi troops have historically served in Somalia, Rwanda, Mozambique, Kuwait, Bosnia and Herzegovina, and Haiti, and units are currently serving in Kuwait and East Timor. For example, Bangladesh responded quickly to US President Bill Clinton's 1994 request for troops and police as part of the multinational intervention to restore democracy in Haiti and provided the largest non-US contingent. As of December 2021, Bangladesh is the largest provider of UN peacekeeping troops with 6,608 personnel, followed by Rwanda with 6,335 personnel.

=== Non-Aligned Movement ===
Bangladesh was selected to provide the next chair of the Non-Aligned Movement (NAM) at the organization's 2001 summit, scheduled to take place in Dhaka. However, it was later decided to host the summit at an alternative venue. As a member of the Non-Aligned Movement, Bangladesh has adopted a principle of staying neutral in the affairs of the great powers. However, it parted from this principle by voting against North Korea at the United Nations in December 2008, under pressure from Japan.

=== Organisation of Islamic Cooperation ===
See also OIC role in Pakistan-Bangladesh relationship

In 1974, then Prime Minister Sheikh Mujibur Rahman, led a Bangladeshi delegation team consisting of Kamal Hossain, Enayet Karim, Ataur Rahman Khan, Taheruddin Thakur, Tofail Ahmed, and Shah Azizur Rahman to the international meeting of the Organisation of the Islamic Conference (OIC, now the Organisation of Islamic Cooperation) held in Lahore. Following this, Bangladesh was admitted as a member of OIC. In 1977, President Ziaur Rahman amended the Constitution of Bangladesh, including a clause stating that "the state shall endeavour to consolidate, preserve and strengthen fraternal relations among Muslim countries based on Islamic solidarity". Since then, an explicit goal of Bangladeshi foreign policy has been to seek close relations with other Islamic states. In 1980, President Ziaur Rahman was included in a 3-member "Al-Quds" summit committee to attend the summit in Morocco. In 1983, Bangladesh hosted the assembled foreign ministers of the OIC in Dhaka. At the OIC headquarters in Jeddah, Bangladesh is represented in the capacity of one of the Director Generals.

=== South Asian Association for Regional Cooperation ===
The government also pursued the expansion of cooperation among the nations of South Asia, bringing the process, an initiative of former President Ziaur Rahman, through its earliest, most tentative stages to the formal inauguration of the South Asian Association for Regional Cooperation (SAARC) at a summit of South Asian leaders in Dhaka in December 1985. Bangladesh has served as the chair of SAARC and has participated in a wide range of ongoing SAARC regional activities

=== Bay of Bengal Initiative for Multi-Sectoral Technical and Economic Cooperation ===
The Bay of Bengal Initiative for Multi-Sectoral Technical and Economic Cooperation (BIMSTEC) is an international organisation that includes South Asian and Southeast Asian nations. The member nations of this group are Bangladesh, India, Myanmar, Sri Lanka, Thailand, Bhutan, and Nepal. The organisation focuses on regional cooperation in the sectors of economics, trade, and investment.

=== Developing-8 Organization for Economic Cooperation ===
Bangladesh is among the 8 member countries of the Developing-8 Organization for Economic Cooperation (D-8). The Developing-8 is an economic alliance consisting of Islamic-majority states that focuses on development in the areas of science and technology, banking, finance, agriculture and rural development, humanitarian development, energy, the environment, health, and finance. On 14 May 2006 in Bali, Indonesia, Bangladesh was the only nation not to sign a preferential trade agreement with the other D-8 states. Bangladesh has been the incumbent chair of the Developing-8 Countries since the organization's tenth summit in Dhaka in April 2021.

=== Asia-Pacific Trade Agreement ===
The Asia-Pacific Trade Agreement (APTA), formerly known as the Bangkok Agreement, was signed in 1975 under one of the major initiatives taken by the United Nations Economic and Social Commission for Asia and the Pacific (UNESCAP). Seven participating states, Bangladesh, the People's Republic of China, India, Laos, Mongolia, the Republic of Korea (South Korea), and Sri Lanka are parties to the APTA. In 2005, Bangladesh signed the APTA agreement in order to enable it to reduce trade deficits between itself and other nations such as China, South Korea, and its neighbour India. The total APTA market includes around 2.9 billion people and, as of the fiscal year (FY) 2015–2016, a gross domestic product (GDP) of around $14.6 trillion USD. APTA's objective is to hasten the economic development of the seven participating states by encouraging trade liberalisation measures.

=== World Trade Organization ===
Bangladesh is an active member of the World Trade Organization (WTO). Bangladesh has had a permanent mission in Geneva to look after matters relating to the multilateral trading system under the WTO regime since the mid-1990s.

=== World Customs Organization ===
Bangladesh is an active member of the World Customs Organization (WCO). Bangladesh has a permanent representative to the WCO, which has its headquarters in Brussels.

=== Like Minded Group ===
Bangladesh has formed an alliance with nineteen other developing countries to vote as a bloc in organisations such as the WTO and the United Nations.

=== Other ===
The government has participated in numerous international conferences, especially those dealing with population, food, development, and women's issues. In 1982–83, Bangladesh played a constructive role as chairman of the "Group of 77", an informal association encompassing most of the world's developing nations. It has taken a leading role in the "Group of 48", another association of developing countries. Aside from the groups detailed previously, Bangladesh also participates in the following international organisations: ARF, AsDB, CP, FAO, IAEA, IBRD, ICAO, ICC, ICCt (signatory), ICRM, IDA, IDB, IFAD, IFC, IFRCS, IHO, ILO, IMF, IMO, Interpol, IOC, IOM, IPU, ISO, ITU, ITUC, MIGA, MINURSO, MONUC, SACEP, UNCTAD, UNESCO, UNHCR, UNIDO, UNMEE, UNMIL, UNMIS, UNOCI, UNOMIG, UNWTO, UPU, WCL, WFTU, WHO, WIPO, WMO, and OPCW.

== Diplomatic relations ==
List of countries which Bangladesh maintains diplomatic relations with:

#	Country	Date
1	India	6 December 1971
2	Poland	12 January 1972
3	Serbia	22 January 1972
4	Russia	25 January 1972
5	Czech Republic	28 January 1972
6	Hungary	29 January 1972
7	Bulgaria	31 January 1972
8	Australia	31 January 1972
9	Austria	4 February 1972
10	Denmark	4 February 1972
11	Germany	4 February 1972
12	United Kingdom	4 February 1972
13	Japan	10 February 1972
14	Netherlands	11 February 1972
15	Philippines	24 February 1972
16	Sri Lanka	4 March 1972
17	Greece	11 March 1972
18	France	17 March 1972
19	Canada	20 March 1972
20	Myanmar	21 March 1972
21	Guyana	24 March 1972
22	Nepal	8 April 1972
23	Sweden	12 April 1972
24	Norway	14 April 1972
25	Indonesia	1 May 1972
26	Finland	5 May 1972
27	Spain	12 May 1972
28	Brazil	15 May 1972
29	United States	18 May 1972
30	Argentina	25 May 1972
31	Cambodia	6 June 1972
32	Switzerland	14 June 1972
33	Mongolia	28 June 1972
34	Romania	29 June 1972
35	New Zealand	4 July 1972
36	Iraq	8 July 1972
37	Fiji	8 September 1972
38	Singapore	10 September 1972
39	Malaysia	11 September 1972
—	Holy See	25 September 1972
40	Thailand	5 October 1972
41	Ireland	1972
42	Italy	18 January 1973
43	Cuba	25 January 1973
44	Vietnam	11 February 1973
45	Afghanistan	18 February 1973
46	Lebanon	28 March 1973
47	Bhutan	12 April 1973
48	Belgium	15 May 1973
49	Morocco	13 July 1973
50	Senegal	13 July 1973
51	Tunisia	17 July 1973
52	Algeria	30 July 1973
53	Syria	14 September 1973
54	Egypt	15 September 1973
55	Sudan	24 September 1973
56	Jordan	15 October 1973
57	Jamaica	5 November 1973
58	Luxembourg	20 November 1973
59	North Korea	9 December 1973
60	South Korea	18 December 1973
61	Barbados	20 February 1974
62	Turkey	22 February 1974
63	Qatar	4 March 1974
64	Kuwait	9 March 1974
65	United Arab Emirates	9 March 1974
66	Bahrain	6 June 1974
67	Iran	21 June 1974
68	Burkina Faso	10 July 1974
69	Ghana	19 July 1974
70	Liberia	19 August 1974
71	Libya	14 December 1974
72	Oman	18 December 1974
73	Portugal	23 December 1974
74	Somalia	24 December 1974
75	Ivory Coast	10 February 1975
76	Venezuela	9 June 1975
77	Mexico	8 July 1975
78	Mauritius	September 1975
79	Pakistan	3 October 1975
80	China	4 October 1975
81	Saudi Arabia	17 November 1975
82	Gambia	1975
83	Nigeria	3 January 1976
84	Sierra Leone	22 January 1976
85	Ethiopia	19 September 1976
86	Mauritania	4 October 1976
87	Kenya	23 November 1976
88	Gabon	1976
89	Albania	10 August 1977
90	Angola	August 1977
91	Uganda	25 November 1977
92	Maldives	22 September 1978
93	Iceland	23 November 1978
94	Zambia	26 July 1979
95	Malta	20 December 1979
96	Zimbabwe	28 August 1981
97	Mali	30 September 1981
98	Cyprus	11 January 1983
99	Nicaragua	15 February 1983
100	Niger	18 February 1983
101	Ecuador	28 February 1983
102	Seychelles	28 February 1983
103	Peru	February 1983
104	Lesotho	4 March 1983
105	Guinea-Bissau	15 March 1983
106	Yemen	21 March 1983
107	Chile	22 March 1983
108	Mozambique	24 March 1983
109	Vanuatu	10 May 1983
110	Saint Lucia	12 May 1983
111	Burundi	23 May 1983
112	Papua New Guinea	20 June 1983
113	Botswana	21 June 1983
114	Belize	29 August 1983
115	Tuvalu	29 August 1983
116	Trinidad and Tobago	22 September 1983
117	Djibouti	25 September 1983
118	Guatemala	7 October 1983
119	Suriname	8 November 1983
120	Tanzania	10 November 1983
121	Samoa	21 December 1983
122	Rwanda	12 January 1984
123	Colombia	14 February 1984
124	Brunei	5 May 1984
125	Panama	5 June 1984
126	Bahamas	8 February 1985
127	Guinea	27 February 1985
128	Uruguay	15 July 1987
129	Laos	1988
130	Bolivia	9 June 1989
—	State of Palestine	24 July 1989
131	Namibia	1990
132	Belarus	21 February 1992
133	Ukraine	24 February 1992
134	Azerbaijan	26 February 1992
135	Turkmenistan	28 February 1992
136	Kazakhstan	1 March 1992
137	Tajikistan	1 March 1992
138	Kyrgyzstan	3 March 1992
139	Georgia	27 August 1992
140	Uzbekistan	15 October 1992
141	Lithuania	2 November 1992
142	Estonia	5 November 1992
143	Armenia	11 November 1992
144	Latvia	21 January 1993
145	Slovakia	3 March 1993
146	Moldova	14 September 1993
147	South Africa	10 September 1994
148	Bosnia and Herzegovina	26 August 1995
149	North Macedonia	14 February 1996
150	Slovenia	20 March 1996
151	Croatia	18 December 1997
152	Timor-Leste	7 June 2002
153	Montenegro	2 March 2007
154	Andorra	9 May 2007
155	Benin	14 July 2008
156	Eswatini	2008
157	South Sudan	16 February 2012
158	Dominican Republic	13 March 2012
159	Malawi	15 March 2012
160	Comoros	14 October 2014
161	El Salvador	7 November 2016
162	San Marino	31 May 2017
163	Honduras	6 September 2017
—	Kosovo	16 February 2018
164	Cape Verde	6 June 2018
165	Republic of the Congo	12 March 2019
166	Paraguay	1 April 2019
167	Palau	16 July 2019
168	Madagascar	4 March 2020
169	Saint Kitts and Nevis	31 August 2020
170	Dominica	24 November 2020
171	Equatorial Guinea	7 April 2022
172	Cameroon	6 December 2022
173	Monaco	13 June 2023
—	Cook Islands	11 April 2024
175	Chad	26 November 2025
175	Grenada	5 February 2026
176	Costa Rica	Unknown
177	Democratic Republic of the Congo	Unknown
178	Kiribati	Unknown

== Asia ==
=== South Asia ===
Bangladesh maintains friendly relations with Bhutan, the Maldives, Nepal, Sri Lanka, Pakistan, and India. It strongly opposed the Soviet invasion of Afghanistan. Bangladesh and Nepal have agreed to facilitate land transit between the two countries.

Country	Formal relations began	Notes
Afghanistan	18 February 1973	See Afghanistan–Bangladesh relations Both countries established diplomatic relations on 18 February 1973 Ties between Afghanistan and Bangladesh go back before the emergence of their modern political borders, sharing historical, cultural and trade relations. In 1971, the Kingdom of Afghanistan was one of the first Muslim countries to recognise the independence of Bangladesh, along with Turkey, Malaysia, and Indonesia. They share similar views on international issues such as combating terrorism and increased regional co-operation. A Bangladeshi NGO, BRAC, is a part of the reconstruction effort in Afghanistan, particularly in microfinance. In 2007, the Afghan ambassador to Bangladesh, Ahmed Karim Nawabi stated that Afghanistan is interested in recruiting workers from Bangladesh.
Bhutan	12 April 1973	See Bangladesh–Bhutan relations Both countries established diplomatic relations on 12 April 1973. Along with India, Bangladesh is one of the only two nations to have a residential embassy in Bhutan. The relationship between Bhutan and Bangladesh has always been positive since 1971, when Bhutan became the first country to recognise the independence of Bangladesh. The business community in Bhutan is asking for more investment from Bangladesh after a meeting with the Federation of Bangladesh Chambers of Commerce and Industry (FBCCI) in Dhaka. During the 2007–2008 fiscal year, Bhutan's imports were worth US$10.8 million, whereas Bangladesh's exports to Bhutan was only worth $0.78 million.
India	6 December 1971	See Bangladesh–India relations, Bangladeshis in India and Indians in Bangladesh Both countries established diplomatic relations on 6 December 1971. Generally, relations are usually friendly; however, government to government contacts are sometimes poor because of border disputes and river disputes. In 2015, they exchanged enclaves to help demarcate the border, and have agreed to work together and end any irritants to ties, like smuggling of cows, border killings, and also river disputes. India was the second country to recognise Bangladesh as a separate and independent state, doing so on 6 December 1971. India helped Bangladeshis during the Bangladesh Liberation War in 1971. Bangladesh's relationship with India has been difficult due to irrigation and land border disputes post-1976. However, Bangladesh has enjoyed a favourable relationship with India during governments formed by the Awami League in 1972 and 1996. At the outset, India's relations with Bangladesh were strong because of India's support for independence in 1971. During the independence war, many refugees fled to India. India also intervened militarily and helped bring international attention to the issue through Indira Gandhi's visit to Washington, D.C. Afterwards India furnished relief and reconstruction aid. India extended recognition to Bangladesh prior to the end of the war in 1971 (the second country to do so after Bhutan) and subsequently lobbied others to follow suit. India also withdrew its military from the land of Bangladesh when Sheikh Mujibur Rahman requested Indira Gandhi to do so during the latter's visit to Dhaka in 1972. Indo-Bangladesh relations have been difficult since the fall of the Mujib government in August 1975 over issues such as the Tin Bigha corridor and access to Nepal, the Farakka Barrage and water sharing, border conflicts near Tripura and the construction of a fence along most of the border which India explains as security provision against migrants, insurgents and terrorists. Bilateral relations warmed in 1996, due to a softer Indian foreign policy and the new Awami League government. A 30-year water-sharing agreement for the Ganges River was signed in December 1996, after an earlier bilateral water-sharing agreement for the Ganges River had lapsed in 1988. Both nations also have cooperated on the issue of flood warning and preparedness. The Bangladesh Government and tribal insurgents signed a peace accord in December 1997, which allowed for the return of tribal refugees who had fled to India, beginning in 1986, to escape violence caused by an insurgency in their homeland in the Chittagong Hill Tracts. There are also small pieces of land along the border region that Bangladesh is diplomatically trying to reclaim. Padua, part of Sylhet Division before 1971, has been under Indian control since the Liberation War. This small strip of land was re-occupied by the BDR in 2001, but later given back to India after the Bangladesh government decided to solve the problem through diplomatic negotiations. In recent years, India has complained that Bangladesh does not secure its border properly. It fears an increasing flow of illegal Bangladeshi migrants and accuses Bangladesh of harbouring Indian separatist groups like ULFA and alleged terrorist groups. The Bangladesh government has consistently denied these accusations. India estimates that over 20 million Bangladeshis are living illegally in India. One Bangladeshi official responded that "there is not a single Bangladeshi migrant in India". Since 2002, India has been constructing an India – Bangladesh Fence along much of the 4,000-kilometre (2,500 mi) border. The failure to resolve migration disputes bears a human cost for illegal migrants, such as imprisonment and health risks (namely HIV/AIDS). In May 2007, they announced that for the first time since the 1965 Indo-Pakistani War, rail service between Kolkata and Dhaka would be restored after a 42-year suspension. Moreover, in October 2007 some cooperation was announced on the border issues mentioned above. After the national election in 2008, the Awami League formed government in January 2009, relationship with India improved. In 2014, a binding ruling by a tribunal of the Permanent Court of Arbitration awarded the disputed New Moore island (called South Talpatti by Bangladesh) to India, and demarcated the sea boundary.
Maldives	22 September 1978	See Bangladesh–Maldives relations Both countries established diplomatic relations on 22 September 1978. The Maldives as a nation is dependent on its tourism sector. It asked Bangladesh to export manpower to the island state. At the 15th SAARC Summit, the Maldives and Bangladesh met on the sidelines to discuss the possibility of sending more semi-skilled and skilled workers. There are already 40,000 workers in the Maldives mostly in unskilled and semi-skilled jobs.
Nepal	8 April 1972	See Bangladesh–Nepal relations Both countries established diplomatic relations on 8 April 1972. Nepal has strong bilateral relations with Bangladesh, as it views the latter nation as a critical access point to the sea, giving it the opportunity to develop potential transit and trade facilities and be less dependent on India and China. Nepal recognised Bangladesh on 16 January 1972 and relations further improved after the military coup in August 1975. The turning point for the two nations occurred in April 1976, when they signed a four-point agreement on technical cooperation, trade, transit, and civil aviation. They both seek cooperation in the fields of power generation and the development of water resources. In 1986, relations further improved when Bangladesh insisted Nepal should be included on a deal regarding the distribution of water from the Ganges River.
Pakistan	3 October 1975	See Bangladesh–Pakistan relations Both countries established diplomatic relations on 3 October 1975. Landmarks in their reconciliation after the two nation's 1971 war: An August 1973 agreement between Bangladesh and Pakistan on the repatriation of numerous individuals, including 90,000 Pakistani prisoners of war stranded in Bangladesh as a result of the Liberation War; A February 1974 accord by Bangladesh and Pakistan on mutual diplomatic recognition, followed more than 2 years later by the establishment of formal diplomatic relations on 18 January 1976; The organisation by the United Nations High Commissioner for Refugees (UNHCR) of an airlift that moved almost 250,000 Bengalis from Pakistan to Bangladesh, and non-Bengalis from Bangladesh to Pakistan; and; Exchanges of high-level visits, including a visit by Prime Minister Benazir Bhutto to Bangladesh in 1989 and visits by Prime Minister Khaleda Zia to Pakistan in 1992 and 1995.; Issues need resolving: Possibly the most important and most sensitive issue is Pakistan's refusal to apologise for the genocide of 1971 which has led to the continuance of strained relations between the two countries.; Repatriation of 250,000 ethnic Biharis known as "Stranded Pakistanis"
Sri Lanka	4 March 1972	See Bangladesh–Sri Lanka relations Both countries established diplomatic relations on 4 March 1972 when Sri Lanka recognized Bangladesh. The Bangladeshi High Commission in Sri Lanka was established on 21 April 1976. Relations are historically tied together even beyond the sub-continent's colonisation by the British. Sri Lanka's first King (to be mentioned in the ancient Pali chronicles) was alleged to have ancestors from the Vanga Kingdom which occupied an area now known as Bangladesh. Bangladesh's Buddhist minority gifted Sri Lanka with a few strands of hair said to have belonged to Buddha as a sign of goodwill. It is a worshiped object on Poya Day, a Buddhist public holiday in Sri Lanka. In August 2008, both heads of state discussed the implementation of new air links in the hope of increasing trade, investment and fostering stronger cultural links. Sri Lanka's current investments have been in Bangladesh's garment and banking sector and expect to diversify into different areas. Bangladesh also hosts a number of Sri Lankan medical students and cricket serves as a form of friendly communications between their people. Some Sri Lankan Navy officers have studied at the Bangladesh Naval Academy.

=== Southeast Asia ===
Country	Formal Relations Began	Notes
Brunei	5 May 1984	See Bangladesh–Brunei relations Both countries established diplomatic relations on 5 May 1984. They are both members of OIC, the Commonwealth of Nations and NAM and share common views on regional and international issues. Brunei recognised Bangladesh quickly with other Southeast Asian countries (Muslim majority nations like Indonesia and Malaysia in particular) and Bangladesh established a residential Diplomatic mission in 1985, although they closed it down in 1988 due to financial constraints. In 1997, Bangladesh reopened its embassy, Brunei has a residential embassy located in Dhaka. Brunei actively supports Bangladesh's candidacy for different regional and international organisations. They supported Bangladesh's United Nation Economic and Social Council 2004–2006 tenure, UNESCO Executive Board 2003–2007 tenure, membership on the Governing Board of the ASEAN Organization of the Supreme Audit Institution (ASOSAI) for the 2004–2006 term, and membership into the ASEAN Regional Forum (ARF). Both countries are looking to increase trade and investment, especially Bangladeshi pharmaceuticals and Bruneian oil. Brunei also imports workers from Bangladesh although recently Bangladesh have been asking to take in more manpower especially professionals and to reduce the price of applying to work in Brunei by half (currently it is US$1,800 per worker from South Asian countries). Education is another part of their relations such as the Brunei Darussalam Government Scholarship for Commonwealth Countries. One Bangladeshi student who wins this scholarship has the opportunity to study at University of Brunei Darussalam (UBD) and Institute Technology Brunei (ITB) to study science-based subjects. Students in Brunei have also been able to go to Bangladesh to study at their Medical Colleges and other higher education institutions offering quality education in Asia at a lower cost compared to western nations. Defence relations is improving although Bangladesh are expecting more trainee officers in the future. Every year Brunei sends its personal for training in Defence Services Command and Staff College and other military institutions. Defence officers from Bangladesh can also visit Military institutions in Brunei although it is only optional. Both countries have agreed to increase air links between the two countries which have already signed two agreements in 2004 and 2006 resulting in Bangladesh granting 5th freedom traffic rights with "intermediate" and "beyond" like Singapore and Dubai. Direct air links could cut travel time between the two countries by more than half, benefiting the 10,000 Bangladeshis working in Brunei. Both countries have set up a joint committee primarily to discuss the current bilateral relations and how it can improve although they can discuss international issues with mostly similar views on.
Cambodia	17 February 1993	See Bangladesh–Cambodia relations Both countries established diplomatic relations on 17 February 1993.
Indonesia	1 May 1972	See Bangladesh–Indonesia relations Both countries established diplomatic relations on 1 May 1972. Indonesia along with other non-Arab Muslim countries such as Malaysia, Turkey and Afghanistan immediately recognised Bangladesh. Relations have gone into different areas such as trade & investment, cultural exchange and peacekeeping. Indonesia is the world largest Muslim country in terms of its population, whereas Bangladesh is the fourth largest Muslim country. Indonesia and Bangladesh are partners in Organisation of Islamic Cooperation, and the Developing-8. Bangladesh has an embassy in Jakarta, whereas Indonesia has an embassy in Dhaka. Since the official bilateral relations were established in 1972, both countries enjoy cordial and friendly relations. Indonesia have recently signed a deal with a pharmaceutical company called Eskayef Bangladesh Ltd. to export its goods to their country where Bangladesh sees another potential market for its pharmaceutical products.
Laos	1988	See Bangladesh–Laos relations Both countries established diplomatic relations in 1988. The relationship between Laos and Bangladesh is cordial.
Malaysia	11 September 1972	See Bangladesh–Malaysia relations Both countries established diplomatic relations on 11 September 1972. Malaysia was one of the first Muslim states along with Indonesia to recognise Bangladesh and since then the two have seen a rapid growth of co-operation between them. Malaysia offers economic and technical assistance, trade and investment while Bangladesh offers a cheap labour workforce for areas such as construction. Malaysia is the largest ASEAN investor in Bangladesh and Malaysian companies have invested US$1.3 billion in 59 projects in 2007 in areas such as telecommunications, textiles and financial sector. However, their trade balance is overwhelmingly in Malaysia's favour. During the 2006–2007 fiscal year, exports were a mere $16.9 million compared to $384.16 million in imports. Trading between the two nations are increasing especially in pharmaceutical exports with a number businesses are calling for a free trade agreement to balance out the trade deficit. Many Malaysian companies have shown a keen interest in participation in Bangladeshi infrastructure projects such as power generation, seaport development, waste disposal systems, construction of roads and highways, as well as in the service sector such as education and healthcare. Malaysia has stated their intentions to continue to contribute to positive efforts in order to promote and expand bilateral relations with Bangladesh, particularly in the trade and investment sectors. Pending projects like the Dhaka-Chittagong highway, worth $1.2 billion, power generation, port development, et cetera, will be completing using these investments. In 2008, Malaysia and Bangladesh signed a memorandum of understanding regarding exchange of information to combat money laundering. The signatories are the financial intelligence units of the central banks of both nations. Bangladesh and Malaysia are also both members of the Developing-8, OIC, Commonwealth of Nations, Like Minded Group, and Non-Aligned Movement showing that the two have similar views on regional and international issues. Issues of labour force administration in Malaysia have somewhat strained the bilateral ties temporarily. In 2007, Malaysia banned imports of Bangladeshi workers into the country after hundreds of them were stranded at an airport because their employers failed to collect them. There were demonstrations in Kuala Lumpur by Bangladeshi workers demanding payments and better conditions. This created a crisis in bilateral ties but the issue has been resolved thanks to the interference of the governments. The Malaysian government had placed a similar restriction in 1999, but lifted the ban in 2011 by approving an initial intake of 300,000 workers.
Myanmar	21 March 1972	See Bangladesh–Myanmar relations Both countries established diplomatic relations on 21 March 1972. At the 2008 ASEAN Regional Forum summit in Singapore, Bangladesh and Myanmar have pledged to solve their maritime boundary disputes as quickly as possible especially that a UN deadline in claiming maritime territories will expire in three years time.
Philippines	24 February 1972	See Bangladesh–Philippines relations Both countries established diplomatic relations on 24 February 1972 Bangladesh and the Philippines have had a very close and friendly relations since the birth of Bangladesh. The Philippines supported the liberation of Bangladesh and recognised it on 24 February 1972. The Philippine Ambassador to the United Nations spoke in favour of the nation during its liberation struggle and also during Bangladesh's admission to the United Nations in 1974.
Singapore	10 September 1972	See Bangladesh–Singapore relations Both countries established diplomatic relations on 10 September 1972. The two nations are founders of the Asian Union. A sizeable number of Bangladeshi migrant workers are currently working in labour-intensive jobs in Singapore. On the sideline of the 78th UN General Assembly in New York, Singapore's Foreign Minister Dr Vivian Balakrishnan told his Bangladeshi counterpart Dr AK Abdul Momen that starting 1 October, its current consulate in Dhaka will be upgraded into High Commission.
Thailand	5 October 1972	See Bangladesh–Thailand relations Both countries established diplomatic relations on 5 October 1972.
Vietnam	11 February 1973	See Bangladesh–Vietnam relations Both countries established diplomatic relations on 11 February 1973

=== East Asia ===
Country	Formal relations began	Notes
China	4 October 1975	See Bangladesh–China relations Both countries established diplomatic relations on 4 October 1975. Early relations with the People's Republic of China were cold due to the rare use of China's veto at the United Nations Security Council to block Bangladesh's accession to the United Nations. Lately however China has made efforts to improve relations with many of its neighbours. Trade with China reached a record level in 2006 of $3.2 billion under the auspices of the Asia-Pacific Trade Agreement (AFTA). The trade balance between the two countries are in China's favour. China has officially agreed to help Bangladesh on developing their nuclear power plant. Bangladesh has also signed the APSCO convention with six other nations to form a pact with China on space exploration.
Republic of China		See Bangladesh-Taiwan relations
Japan	10 February 1972	See Bangladesh–Japan relations and Bangladeshis in Japan Both countries established diplomatic relations on 10 February 1972. Japan is Bangladesh's 11th-largest export market; imports from Bangladesh make up 26% of all Japanese imports from the least developed countries, second only to those from Cambodia. Common exports from Bangladesh to Japan include leather goods, ready-made garments, and seafood. By 2004, Japan had become Bangladesh's fourth-largest source of foreign direct investment, behind the United States, United Kingdom, and Malaysia. Japan's political goals in its relationship with Bangladesh include gaining support for their bid to join the United Nations Security Council, and securing markets for their finished goods. Japan is a significant source of development aid to Bangladesh.
North Korea	9 December 1973	See Bangladesh–North Korea relations Both countries established diplomatic relations on 9 December 1973. Due to their pro-China administration, North Korea did not establish ties until China recognised and established relations with Bangladesh in 1974. There is a North Korean embassy located in Dhaka although Bangladesh maintains a non-residential status. Instead communication between North Korea and Bangladesh is with the Bangladeshi embassy in Beijing. Relations have only gone as far as recognition and neither nation has ever desired to progress this even further, especially due to the increase in military co-operation between Bangladesh and South Korea and North Korea's isolationist policies. In 2006, Bangladesh have used its ties with North Korea, urging them to comply with a UN resolution after North Korea's missile launch during a meeting with then Japanese Foreign Minister, Taro Aso.
South Korea	18 December 1973	See Bangladesh–South Korea relations Both countries established diplomatic relations on 18 December 1973 Relations are considered to be productive and progressive. Their relations have gone on to expand in several areas such as defence and trade & investment. Bangladesh also sends a large number of skilled migrant workers to South Korea to work in the following sectors:- construction, manufacture, services, and agriculture, fisheries and livestock. South Korea and Bangladesh are also increasing military ties such as joint military exercises training of units such as special forces and building a submarine. Bangladesh has already procured a ULSAN class frigate from South Korea.

=== Central Asia ===
Country	Formal relations began	Notes
Kyrgyzstan	3 March 1992	See Bangladesh–Kyrgyzstan relations After the dissolution of the Soviet Union in 1991, both countries established diplomatic relations on 3 March 1992. Bangladesh has encouraged Kyrgyzstan to purchase garments and jute products. Educational exchange has been mentioned as an area of mutual interest.
Kazakhstan	1 March 1992	See Bangladesh–Kazakhstan relations Both countries established diplomatic relations on 1 March 1992
Tajikistan	1 March 1992	See Bangladesh–Tajikistan relations Both countries established diplomatic relations on 1 March 1992

=== Western Asia (Middle East) ===
During the Bangladesh Liberation War, the majority of conservative Arab nations were against Bangladeshi liberation because India, a largely non-Muslim nation, was supporting the break-up of a Pakistan, an Islamic country. However, non-Arab Islamic nations such as Indonesia and Turkiye established relations quickly. At the present, Bangladesh maintains relations with the Middle East through many areas such as commerce, history, military, and most importantly religious ties which enabled the two to co-operate more easily than with Western or Far Eastern partners. Bangladesh supplies over one million guest workers to Saudi Arabia, the United Arab Emirates, Kuwait, and other Gulf states. In turn, most of Bangladesh's oil is imported from this region.

Bangladesh strongly opposed the Israeli bombardment of South Lebanon which killed approximately 1,191 civilians and described it as "State Terrorism" and a double standard conflict, saying that a non-western nation would have been labelled a terrorist and a western nation would have never been deemed a terrorist. It also contributed to the peacekeeping effort after the 2006 Lebanon War by sending in battalions of infantry.

Country	Formal relations began	Notes
Iran	21 June 1974	See Bangladesh–Iran relations Both countries established diplomatic relations on 21 June 1974. The Bangladeshi embassy in Iran was established on 21 June 1974, and the Iranian embassy in Bangladesh was established on 24 January 1975. Immediately after the independence of Bangladesh, many non-Arab nations quickly recognised the new country. However, due to the strong pro-US attitude of the Shah and helping to transport weapons to West Pakistan during the Bangladesh Liberation War. Iran, however, established diplomatic relations with independent Bangladesh in early 1972. A turning point in relations was during the Iraq-Iran War when Bangladesh as a UN Security Council member tried to broker a ceasefire between the nations and settle their disputes with dialogue. Eventually, Bangladesh would participate in UNIIMOG mission to observe that agreements such as a ceasefire had been honoured. In 1995, Akbar Hashemi Rafsanjani became the first President of Iran to visit Bangladesh. The current president, Hassan Rouhani is looking to strengthen relations with countries in South Asia such as Bangladesh by increasing Iranian investment like building oil refineries. In return, Bangladesh is supporting Iran's rights to its Nuclear Program for Peaceful Purposes. In 2006, both countries signed a preferential trade accord which removes non-tariff barriers, hoping to take it further to a free trade agreement and in 2007, Bangladesh has requested Iranian assistance on building its nuclear power plant. Both countries are members of Developing-8 Countries, OIC, Like Minded Group. They have generally similar views on world issues especially on the occupation of Palestine.
Iraq	8 July 1972	See Bangladesh–Iraq relations Both countries established diplomatic relations on 8 July 1972. Iraq was the first Arab nation to recognise the independence of Bangladesh. Bangladesh and Iraq have embassies located in Baghdad and Dhaka. Iraq temporarily closed down their embassy after the Iraq War began but after a six-year lapse appointed a new ambassador in October 2007. Bangladesh and Iraq's ties are primarily based on common faith but there has not been much progression into areas such as trade and investment. Between 1980 and 1986, Iraq sent five officers to study in Bangladesh's military academy in Dhaka. The only notable visit between the two nations was Saddam Hussein's visit to Bangladesh in 1988. The height of Bangladesh-Iraq relations was during the 1980s due to Bangladesh's role in trying to call for a ceasefire between Iraq and Iran during their war and was a part of UNIIMOG. Relations quickly deteriorated after Iraq invaded Kuwait sparking the Gulf War and a huge rise in oil prices. Bangladesh responded to the UN resolution demanding Iraq withdraw by the deadline or face military action. Bangladesh's other reasons for participation was because of the Bangladeshi community in Kuwait who some work on oil rigs and Kuwait is Bangladesh's oil supplier. Bangladesh joined the UN coalition to liberate Kuwait. Relations between Baghdad and Dhaka would later improve after the US invasion of Iraq in 2003 when Bangladesh declined to send troops to Iraq despite America's persistence and stating that the UN should have had a primary role in solving the matter before the war. Currently they want a complete withdrawal from Iraq and has expressed support for reconstruction efforts. The public in Bangladesh have repeatedly held large demonstrations against the war.
Israel		See Bangladesh–Israel relations Bangladesh does not recognise Israel. even though Israel was one of the first nations to recognise Bangladesh. It has called for an end to Israel's occupation of the Palestinian territories and for the creation of an independent Palestinian state. Bangladesh has a complete ban on trade (indirect and direct) with Israel even though both are members of the WTO. As Bangladesh does not have any diplomatic relations with Israel, it is not permitted for Bangladeshis to travel to Israel using a Bangladeshi passport, which brought about the arrest of journalist Salah Choudhury. In the immediate aftermath of the 2006 Lebanon War Bangladesh offered to send battalions of its infantrymen to help with the UN peacekeeping force, however Israel opposed it stating Bangladesh does not recognise Israel. Although Israel rejected the country's participation, Bangladesh and Nepal were the first countries whose troops reached the shores of South Lebanon. As of 3 December 2015 Bangladesh has 285 personnel participating in UNIFIL in Lebanon.
Jordan	15 October 1973	See Bangladesh–Jordan relations Both countries established diplomatic relations on 15 October 1973
Lebanon	28 March 1973	See Bangladesh–Lebanon relations Both countries established diplomatic relations on 28 March 1973 Ties between the two are based on common background such as religious tolerance, the need to tackle Islamic militancy, similar views on global events and common religion. Bangladesh opposed Israel's bombing of South Lebanon during the 2006 Lebanon War and offered to contribute approximately 2,000 troops to the peacekeeping force. As of 3 December 2015 Bangladesh has 285 personal participating in UNIFIL in Lebanon. Bangladesh Navy has also contributed a vessel to the UNIFIL Maritime Task Force (MTF) in Lebanon. Bangladesh like other South Asian countries also send workers to Lebanon to work in domestic and manual jobs, although many like those in the Gulf states complain of harsh conditions and low wages. During the 2006 Lebanon War, some of the Bangladeshis returned home but some went unpaid as their employers escaped the conflict by travelling abroad.
Oman	18 December 1974	See Bangladesh–Oman relations Both countries established diplomatic relations on 18 December 1974
Palestine	8 January 1981	See Bangladesh–Palestine relations Relations between Bangladesh and Palestine are considered to be warm and cordial as Bangladesh advocates for an independent Palestinian state and an end to Israeli occupation. Bangladesh is one of the 135 countries to recognise Palestine as a state since the Palestinian Declaration of Independence on 15 November 1988. The first high-level meeting between the two was in 1974 at the second OIC summit in Lahore, Pakistan between Sheikh Mujibur Rahman and Yasser Arafat. Since then there have been high level contact such as Yasser Arafat's visits in 1981 and 1987 who was warmly received by both former presidents Ziaur Rahman and Hossain Mohammad Ershad with favourable media coverage. Later when democracy returned to Bangladesh, Arafat was also received warmly by Prime Ministers Khaleda Zia and Sheikh Hasina. There is a wide public support for an independent Palestine as the Government had reported in 1987 that 8,000 had volunteered for the PLO although there had never been any official moves to send weapons or personnel. Since the 1980s, under IMET (International Military Education and Training) there have been development of military ties between the PLO and Bangladesh with the former attending one year courses at the Bangladesh Military Academy in Chittagong. Palestine is represented in Bangladesh by the Embassy of the State of Palestine in Dhaka. Bangladesh also provided material help to establish the diplomatic mission.
Qatar	4 March 1974	See Bangladesh–Qatar relations Both countries established diplomatic relations on 4 March 1974
Saudi Arabia	17 November 1975	See Bangladesh–Saudi Arabia relations Both countries established diplomatic relations on 17 November 1975. Early relations between Riyadh and Dhaka where somewhat dormant owing to the former capital's country's close bond with Pakistan. From mid-1970s onward Bangladesh was seeking closer ties with oil rich Arab states such as Saudi Arabia. After the 1982 coup by Ershad, he visited Riyadh to meet with the King. Nine months later a ten-member delegation of the Saudi military arrived in Bangladesh to discuss possible military ties and inspect its facilities. Since 1981, Saudi Arabia has sent 100 officers to the Defence Services Command & Staff College in Dhaka, which is the college's largest number of overseas graduates from a single nation. Bangladesh is seeking to increase economic ties with Saudi Arabia to reduce the trade deficit currently in the Kingdom's favour. One of their proposals is to export ceramics, leather and pharmaceutical products to the Kingdom as they are already doing with the western nations.
Syria	14 September 1973	See Bangladesh–Syria relations Both countries established diplomatic relations on 14 September 1973
Turkey	22 February 1974	See Bangladesh–Turkey relations Both countries established diplomatic relations on 22 February 1974: Bangladesh has an embassy in Ankara.; Turkey has an embassy in Dhaka.; Both countries are members of OIC.; Trade volume between the two countries was US$934 million in 2019 (Bangladeshi exports/imports: 509/427 billion USD).; Bangladesh-Turkey relations have been excellent since Turkey recognised Bangladesh in 1971, soon after independence. The trade volume between the two countries have grown as did Bangladeshi exports and has been in Bangladesh's favour throughout their economic relationship. The present bilateral trade (2011) is more than US$1 billion. The two countries also have institutionalised co-operation in areas of investment, customs, health, defence, agriculture, education, air service, tourism and culture. Bangladesh and Turkey co-operate with each other at the multilateral forum, particularly in matters related to elections. In the recent years, Turkey and Bangladesh have supported each other in several forums, including at the ITU, IMO, CEDAW, HRC, etc. Turkey would support Bangladesh's 2016–17 candidature to the UN Security Council while Bangladesh would support Turkey's 2015–16 candidature to the UNSC. Besides, at the UN and OIC, the two countries are also the founding members of the D-8 (Developing-8 Countries) with six other nations with large Muslim populations.
United Arab Emirates	9 March 1974	See Bangladesh–United Arab Emirates relations Both countries established diplomatic relations on 9 March 1974
Yemen	21 March 1983	See Bangladesh–Yemen relations Both countries established diplomatic relations on 21 March 1983 South Yemen was the first Arab state to recognize Bangladesh (other Arab states had supported Pakistan in the 1971 war), and the support for Bangladeshi independence marked an emerging split between South Yemen and China.

== Africa ==
Bangladesh's presence in Africa is mostly due to their large contribution to the peacekeeping forces present around the continent such as Liberia, Sierra Leone, Ivory Coast, Sudan (Darfur) and Somalia. Bangladesh can foster ties based on its history such as nations in Southeast Africa where there is a South Asian population (whose ancestors immigrated there during the British Empire). In countries such as Ivory Coast and Sierra Leone, Bangladeshi peacekeepers have been honoured. It is currently trying to increase ties with the southern economic bloc in Southern Africa with nations such as Zimbabwe.

Country	Formal Relations Began	Notes
Algeria	30 July 1973	See Algeria–Bangladesh relations Both countries established diplomatic relations on 30 July 1973
Botswana	21 June 1983	See Bangladesh–Botswana relations Both countries established diplomatic relations on 21 June 1983
Cote d'Ivoire	10 February 1975	See Bangladesh–Ivory Coast relations Both countries established diplomatic relations on 10 February 1975 when Bangladesh's first Ambassador to the Ivory Coast, Mr. Anwrul Haq, has presented his credentials to President Houphouet - Boigny
Egypt	15 September 1973	See Bangladesh–Egypt relations Both countries established diplomatic relations on 15 September 1973 Bangladesh and Egypt share views on international policies such as the occupation of Palestine and both being members of D-8, OIC and the Like Minded Group has helped to strengthen relations. Trade volume between the two countries was US$55 million in 2008–09. Bangladesh primarily buys fertiliser, iron, steel, and mining products from Egypt and sells mainly textiles. A small number of Bangladeshi students study in Egypt under its scholarship programme.
Gambia	1975	A business delegation from The Gambia, led by Minister of Trade, Industry, Regional Integration and Employment Abdoulie Jobe, visited Bangladesh in December 2014.
Ghana	19 July 1974	See Bangladesh–Ghana relations Both countries established diplomatic relations on 19 July 1974 when Bangladesh High Commissioner to Ghana presented his credentials to the Head of State Colonel I. K. Acheampong
Kenya	23 November 1976	See Bangladesh–Kenya relations Both countries established diplomatic relations on 23 November 1976
Liberia	19 August 1974	See Bangladesh–Liberia relations
Libya	14 December 1974	See Bangladesh–Libya relations Both countries established diplomatic relations on 14 December 1974 Relations between the two were non-existent due to the refusal to recognise Bangladesh and granting asylum to some of those who assassinated Sheikh Mujib. After Bangladesh began sending its diplomats to the Arab world such as Libya to explain their view of the war, they immediately recognised and established diplomatic relations with Bangladesh. Bangladesh opened its embassy in Tripoli on 8 January 1975. Cooperation between the two countries is primarily in international forums such as the United Nations and the Organisation of Islamic Cooperation. Bangladesh has expressed interest in increased economic ties, and specifically in exporting pharmaceutical products to Libya. Bangladesh has asked Libya to ease visa restrictions for Bangladesh nationals and to take in more manpower. Apart from labourers there are also Bangladeshis working in professional occupations increasing people to people links. Bangladesh has also welcomed Libyan students to study engineering and medical degrees at their universities. Bangladesh is an accredited mission to Tunisia and Malta and uses its embassy in Libya to communicate with those countries.
Malawi	15 March 2012	See Bangladesh–Malawi relations
Mali	30 September 1981	See Bangladesh–Mali relations Both countries established diplomatic relations on 30 September 1981
Mauritius	1975	See Bangladesh–Mauritius relations
Nigeria	3 January 1976	See Bangladesh–Nigeria relations Both countries established diplomatic relations on 3 January 1976 Both nations are members of the OIC and the Developing 8 Countries. Nigeria has a high commission in the Bangladeshi capital Dhaka.
Rwanda	12 January 1984	See Bangladesh–Rwanda relations Both countries established diplomatic relations on 12 January 1984
Sierra Leone	22 January 1976	See Bangladesh–Sierra Leone relations Both countries established diplomatic relations on 22 January 1976 when has been accredited High Commissioner of Bangladesh to Sierra Leone Mr. M. Anwarul Haq
South Africa	10 September 1994	See Bangladesh–South Africa relations Both countries established diplomatic relations on 10 September 1994 Due to the brutality and the White Supremacist ideology of the Apartheid regime, relations between South Africa and Bangladesh were non-existent until the collapse of white minority rule and Nelson Mandela's rise to power. There is a number of Bangladeshis which make up the South Asian community in South Africa and immigration still continues, although it has temporarily halted due to attacks against foreign workers. Bangladesh exports its raw materials such as leather, jute, garments and textiles. South Africa exports to Bangladesh are iron ore, steel, aluminium, infrastructure projects, machinery and equipments for railways.
Sudan	24 September 1973	See Bangladesh–Sudan relations Both countries established diplomatic relations on 24 September 1973 Throughout the course of history, relations between Bangladesh and Sudan have been warm and smooth. Seeing as both nations share a common religion, relations are generally good, but only recently has co-operation began to increase between the two countries. In March 2008, both governments came to an agreement which would primarily allow Bangladesh to export semi-skilled and skilled workers and also the opportunity to allow Bangladeshi firms and companies to expand their operations to Africa's largest country by size which is now enjoying an oil boom regardless of the events occurring in Darfur since 2007. The relationship between Bangladesh and Sudan thickened as UN Peacekeeping Mission manned by the Bangladeshi military started to work in Sudan in 2007. Bangladesh agreed to send 1,600 of its personal and urgently needed helicopters to join the UN peacekeeping force in Darfur. As part of the growing relationship, Bangladesh will open a full-fledged Diplomatic mission in Khartoum. Relations have diverged into different areas such as education where Sudan has offered more scholarships to Bangladeshi students and recently Sudan has shown interest in importing pharmaceuticals from Bangladesh.
South Sudan	16 February 2012	See Bangladesh–South Sudan relations Both countries established diplomatic relations on 16 February 2012 Bangladesh recognised South Sudan as a country. Bangladeshi peacekeepers played an important role in the UN missions in South Sudan.
Tanzania	24 June 1983	See Bangladesh–Tanzania relations Both countries established diplomatic relations on 24 June 1983 Like other countries in Southeast Africa, they share historical and religious ties to the former British Indian nations such as Pakistan, India and Bangladesh. Tanzania has a South Asian community due to the immigration of Indian clerical workers to this part of Africa during the time of the British Empire. Tanzania has recently decided to import pharmaceutical goods from a Bangladeshi company known as Square Pharmaceuticals Ltd. Tanzania was originally heavily dependent on India and other MNCs for medicines.
Uganda	25 November 1977	See Bangladesh–Uganda relations Both countries established diplomatic relations on 25 November 1977

== Europe ==
European countries provide significant economic assistance to Bangladesh. Scandinavian countries contribute a greater percentage of their GDP to this aid than the rest of Europe does. Europe is the top export destination for Bangladeshi products (53% in 2021). Textiles make up 97% of these exports, followed by agricultural products, particularly shrimp.

Country	Formal relations began	Notes
Austria	4 February 1972	See Austria–Bangladesh relations Both countries established diplomatic relations on 4 February 1972
Belarus	21 February 1992	See Bangladesh–Belarus relations Both countries established diplomatic relations on 21 February 1992
Bulgaria	31 January 1972	See Bangladesh–Bulgaria relations Both countries established diplomatic relations on 31 January 1972
Cyprus	11 January 1983	See Bangladesh–Cyprus relations Both countries established diplomatic relations on 11 January 1983
Denmark	4 February 1972	See Bangladesh–Denmark relations Both countries established diplomatic relations on 4 February 1972
France	17 March 1972	See Bangladesh–France relations Both countries established diplomatic relations on 17 March 1972 when Bangladesh opened its embassy in Paris France and Bangladesh share an amicable relationship. In 1991, France cancelled Bangladesh's public debt (FRF 598M) as a gesture of goodwill. Trade between the two remains in Bangladesh's favour with France being its fourth largest customer in 2005 (5.9% of Bangladeshi exports). France has many direct investments in the country such as the Lafarge cement plant in Chatak and has recently shown interest in aiding Bangladesh with the development of a nuclear power plant for civilian purposes.
Germany	4 February 1972	See Bangladesh–Germany relations Both countries established diplomatic relations on 4 February 1972 After the independence of Bangladesh in 1971, East Germany was the third country in the world, and the first country in Europe, to officially recognise Bangladesh in 1972.
Greece	11 March 1972	See Bangladesh–Greece relations Both countries established diplomatic relations on 11 March 1972.
Holy See	25 September 1972	See Bangladesh–Holy See relations Both countries established diplomatic relations on 25 September 1972.
Hungary	29 January 1972	See Bangladesh–Hungary relations Both countries established diplomatic relations on 29 January 1972
Ireland	12 July 2000	See Bangladesh–Ireland relations Both countries established diplomatic relations on 12 July 2000
Italy	18 January 1973	See Bangladesh–Italy relations Both countries established diplomatic relations on 18 January 1973
Kosovo	16 February 2018	See Bangladesh–Kosovo relations Both countries established diplomatic relations on 16 February 2018 Bangladesh recognised the Republic of Kosovo as independent state on 27 February 2017.
Latvia	21 January 1993	See Bangladesh–Latvia relations Both countries established diplomatic relations on 21 January 1993
Luxembourg	20 November 1973	See Bangladesh–Luxembourg relations Both countries established diplomatic relations on 20 November 1973
Netherlands	11 February 1972	See Bangladesh–Netherlands relations Both countries established diplomatic relations on 11 February 1972: Bangladesh has an embassy in The Hague.; the Netherlands has an embassy in Dhaka.
Poland	12 January 1972	See Bangladesh–Poland relations Both countries established diplomatic relations on 12 January 1972: Bangladesh has an embassy in Warsaw.; Poland is accredited to Bangladesh from its embassy in New Delhi, India.
Portugal	23 December 1974	See Bangladesh–Portugal relations Both countries established diplomatic relations on 23 December 1974
Romania	29 June 1972	See Bangladesh–Romania relations Both countries established diplomatic relations on 29 June 1972
Russia	25 January 1972	See Bangladesh–Russia relations Both countries established diplomatic relations on 25 January 1972
Serbia	22 January 1972	See Bangladesh–Serbia relations Both countries established diplomatic relations on 22 January 1972
Slovakia	3 March 1993	See Bangladesh–Slovakia relations Both countries established diplomatic relations on 3 March 1993
Spain	12 May 1972	See Bangladesh–Spain relations Both countries established diplomatic relations on 12 May 1972: Bangladesh has an embassy in Madrid.; Spain has an embassy in Dhaka.
Sweden	12 April 1972	See Bangladesh–Sweden relations Both countries established diplomatic relations on 12 April 1972
Ukraine	24 February 1992	See Bangladesh–Ukraine relations Both countries established diplomatic relations on 24 February 1992
United Kingdom	4 February 1972	See Bangladesh–United Kingdom relations and British Bangladeshi Bangladesh established diplomatic relations with the United Kingdom on 4 February 1972.: Bangladesh maintains a high commission in London.; The United Kingdom is accredited to Bangladesh through its high commission in Dhaka.; The UK governed Bangladesh from 1699 to 1947, when it achieved independence as part of Pakistan. Both countries share common membership of the Commonwealth, the International Criminal Court, and the World Trade Organization. Bilaterally the two countries have a Development Partnership, a Double Taxation Convention, an Investment Agreement, and an Illegal Migration Returns Agreement. The ties between Britain and Bangladesh date back to the British Raj. During the Bangladesh Liberation War Britain offered shelter to diplomats and people who escaped the conflict. The government, politicians and the media were also critical of the atrocities and shown empathy for the Mukti Bahini. On 4 February 1972 Britain recognised Bangladesh, this eventually led to recognition from other European and Commonwealth nations and Bangladesh's induction into the Commonwealth on 18 April 1972. Britain holds the largest Bangladeshi diaspora in the western world, now numbered at around 500,000, most of them can trace their ties to the region of Sylhet. Britain also holds the largest open air Asian festival in Europe called Baishakhi Mela, a Bangladeshi event held in London. There has been numerous delegation visits since Foreign Secretary Alec Douglas-Home visited Bangladesh in June 1972. The first visit by a prime minister was James Callaghan in 1978. Other prime ministers who had visited Bangladesh are John Major in a 3-day visit in January 1997 and Tony Blair in 2002. Presidents and Prime Ministers of Bangladesh such as Sheikh Mujib, Ziaur Rahman and Fakhruddin Ahmed have visited the UK. In March 2008, Fakhruddin Ahmed had visited Number 10 Downing Street to discuss increasing British investment and co-operation in defence and trade, especially on counter-terrorism and duty-free access for LDCs. Britain is the largest foreign investor in Bangladesh and the third greatest export destination for Bangladeshi goods after US and Germany. At the 7th ISS Asia Security Summit (also known as Shangri-La Dialogue) in Singapore, Bangladesh's Foreign advisor Iftekhar Ahmed Chowdhury met with UK's Defence Minister Des Browne at the sidelines to discuss security and defence relations between the two countries. Browne says he hoped that Bangladesh's modernising values can reach the Bangladeshi diaspora in the UK.
European Union		See Bangladesh–European Union relations

== America ==
Country	Formal Relations Began	Notes
Argentina	25 May 1972	See Argentina–Bangladesh relations Both countries established diplomatic relations on 25 May 1972
Brazil	15 May 1972	See Bangladesh–Brazil relations Both countries established diplomatic relations on 15 May 1972 Bangladesh's only embassy in South America is located in Brazil. Trade is the primary part of their relations exporting raw materials such as metals from its open mines and importing pharmaceutical products from Bangladesh.
Canada	20 March 1972	See Bangladesh–Canada relations and Bangladeshi Canadian Both countries established diplomatic relations on 20 March 1972. Relations between the two countries are positive and there are approximately 24,595 Canadians of Bangladeshi origin living in Canada.
Chile	22 March 1983	See Bangladesh–Chile relations Both countries established diplomatic relations on 22 March 1983
Colombia	14 February 1984	See Bangladesh–Colombia relations Both countries established diplomatic relations on 14 February 1984
Cuba	25 January 1973	See Bangladesh–Cuba relations Both countries established diplomatic relations on 25 January 1973
Haiti		See Bangladesh–Haiti relations
Mexico	8 July 1975	See Bangladesh–Mexico relations Both countries established diplomatic relations on 8 July 1975: Bangladesh has an embassy in Mexico City.; Mexico is accredited to Bangladesh from its embassy in New Delhi, India.
Panama	5 June 1984	See Bangladesh–Panama relations Both countries established diplomatic relations on 5 June 1984
Trinidad and Tobago	22 September 1983	See Bangladesh–Trinidad and Tobago relations Both countries established diplomatic relations on 22 September 1983
United States	18 May 1972	See Bangladesh–United States relations and Bangladeshi American Both countries established diplomatic relations on 18 May 1972 The United States is an aid donor to Bangladesh. It provides assistance during natural calamities. In the post 9/11 scenario, American policy-makers expressed support for moderation in Bangladesh. The US State Department voiced support for free elections before 2008 ends. Approximately 150,000 citizens are of Bangladeshi origin with the majority in professional jobs.: Bangladesh has an embassy in Washington, DC and has consulates-general in Los Angeles and New York City.; United States has an embassy in Dhaka.
Uruguay	21 July 1987	See Bangladesh–Uruguay relations Both countries established diplomatic relations on 21 July 1987
Venezuela	9 June 1975	See Bangladesh–Venezuela relations Both countries established diplomatic relations on 9 June 1975 Bangladesh and Venezuela have maintained good ties as both nations have begun increased communications with each other. In August 2006, Venezuela had asked Bangladesh for support for a non-permanent seat in the UN Security Council although Venezuela was not successful due to the repeated deadlocks in the 2006 UN Security Council election.

== Disputes – international ==
=== India ===
- Sharing the water of the Teesta
- Ganges Barrage Project
- Border killings of Bangladeshi civilians

=== Myanmar ===
- Steps to repatriate Rohingya people refugees who fled from Rakhine State.

== See also ==
- List of diplomatic missions in Bangladesh
- List of diplomatic missions of Bangladesh
- Visa requirements for Bangladeshi citizens
- Visa policy of Bangladesh
