= Bangladesh–Cyprus relations =

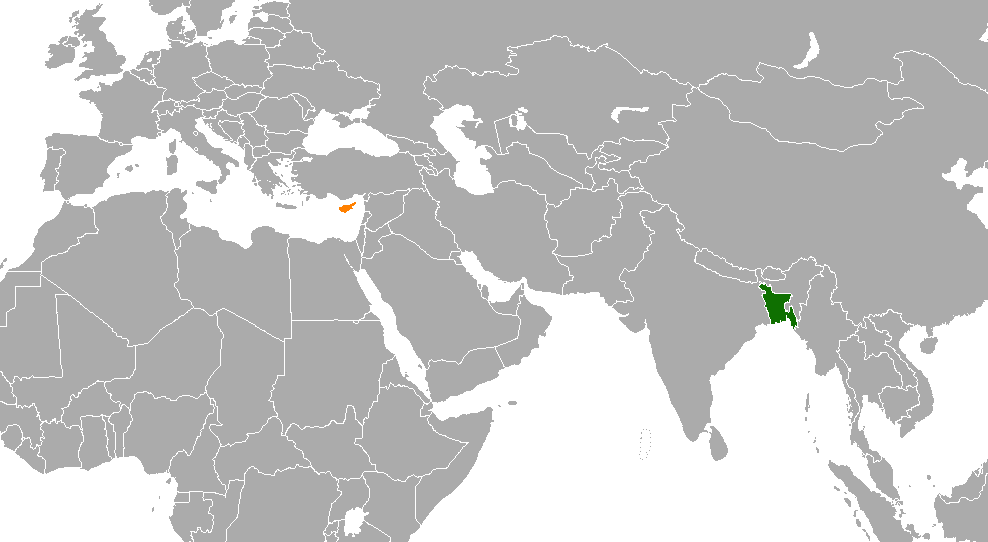

- Bangladesh: Cyprus

Bangladesh–Cyprus relations refer to the bilateral relations between Bangladesh and Cyprus. Neither country has a resident high commissioner. Both countries are members of the Commonwealth of Nations. Relations between the two countries have remained cordial with both showing willingness to strengthen them further.

== Cooperation in education ==
Bangladesh and Cyprus have been cooperating each other in the education sector. A number of Bangladeshi students get admitted into Cypriot universities to seek entrance in the European job market.

== Economic cooperation ==
Bangladesh and Cyprus have shown interest to expand the existing bilateral economic activities between the two countries and have been working in this regard. Bangladeshi ready made garments, pharmaceuticals, leather and leather products have been identified as having good potential in the Cypriot market.

== Cultural relations ==
Bangladesh sent two captive born female elephants to Paphos zoo. The Asian elephants were reared by Bangladesh Forest Development Corporation.

== See also ==
- Foreign relations of Bangladesh
- Foreign relations of Cyprus
