= Bangladesh–Syria relations =

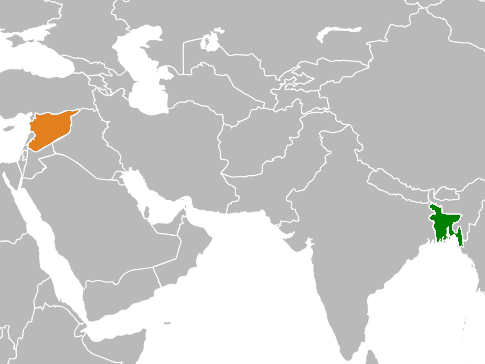

- Bangladesh: Syria

Bangladesh–Syria relations refer to the bilateral relations between Bangladesh and Syria. Syria is accredited to Bangladesh from its embassy in New Delhi. Bangladesh has an consulate-general in Damascus.

== History ==
Syria opposed Indian interference in the Bangladesh Liberation War in 1971, describing it as an internal matter of Pakistan. Both countries established diplomatic relations on 14 September 1973. Bangladesh exported jute products worth over 1 billion taka to Syrian per year between 2012 and 2013.

=== Syrian war ===
Bangladesh's foreign ministry condemned the use of chemical weapons "by any party under any circumstances" after a chemical attack in Syria on 2013. It has called for the conflict to be ended through "diplomatic and peaceful means".

A few Bangladeshis have also joined the Islamic State militant group in Syria. A number of British-Bangladeshi including entire families have joined the Islamic State as well. Tamim Chowdhury, a Bangladeshi-Canadian who fought in Syria would become the head of the Islamic State unit in Bangladesh. In 2015 and 2016, Bangladeshi women were trafficked to Syria where they were forced to work as sex workers and as slave labor. The women were promised jobs as maids in Lebanon. In 2016, the Government of Bangladesh issued an advisory against travelling to Syria.

On the resolution of the conflict in Syria, a Bangladeshi government official said that "In the current context, a neutral position does not always satisfy all parties." Another government official added: "We support peace. We want a peaceful solution to the situation, thanks to which Syria will retain its sovereignty."

On 10 February 2023, the Government of Bangladesh has sent relief to the victims of the recent earthquake in Syria.

== See also ==
- Foreign relations of Bangladesh
- Foreign relations of Syria
