= Bangladesh–Cuba relations =

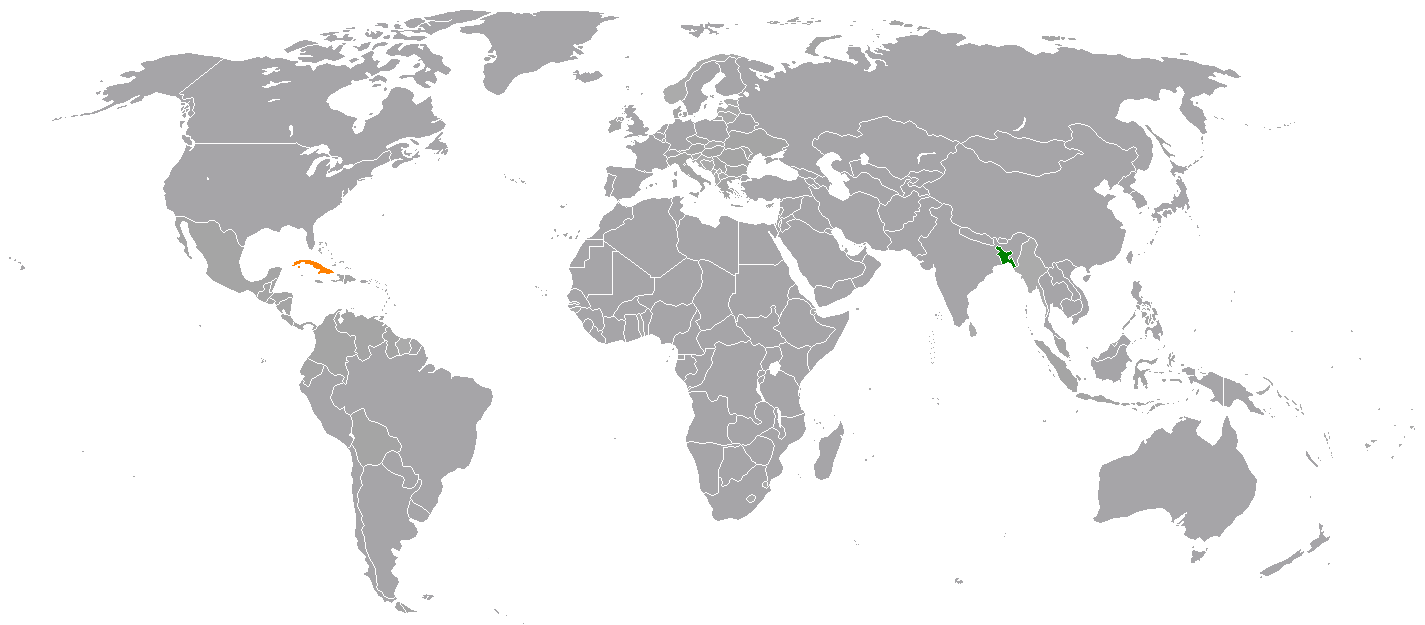

- Bangladesh: Cuba

Bangladesh–Cuba relations refer to the bilateral relations between Bangladesh and Cuba. Relations between the two countries have been warm with both the countries putting their efforts to strengthen them further.

== History ==
Diplomatic relations between the two countries were officially started in 1972, right after the independence of Bangladesh. The relations took a turning point when Bangladesh signed a controversial agreement with Cuba to export jute bags in 1974. The deal enraged the United States who had hostile relations with Cuba and led to the suspension of US food aid to Bangladesh. This was followed by a devastating flood in July–August 1974 that submerged a large portion of Bangladesh and caused a severe damage to the domestic food production. As a result, the country got hit by a deadly famine that killed almost 1 million people through starvation. To allow the food and other aid from the United States, Bangladesh government cut all ties with Cuba and the bilateral relations reached the nadir. The relations got rejuvenated when former Bangladesh president Ziaur Rahman became the first Bangladeshi head of state to pay an official visit to Havana in 1979. Cubans can get Visa on arrival in Bangladesh.

== High level visits ==
Former President of Bangladesh Ziaur Rahman paid an official visit to Havana in 1979.

== Political ==
Rally was held in Bangladesh to demand the release of the Cuban Five and 10,000 signatures were collected for a petition. A ship of Ocean Maritime Management Company Ltd (OMM) which is owned by North Korea and was involved in the smuggling of weapons into Cuba was turned away from Chittagong port by Bangladesh Navy. The company was under UN sanctions for carrying prohibited arms from North Korea to Cuba.

== Economic cooperation ==
Bangladesh and Cuba have expressed their interest to expand the bilateral economic cooperation between the two countries and have been working in this regard. Pharmaceuticals industries have been identified as a potential sector for the economic cooperation between the two countries.

== Cultural ==
Afro-Cuban funk jazz band Motimba performed concerts of Cuban jazz in Dhaka.

== See also ==
- Foreign relations of Bangladesh
- Foreign relations of Cuba
