= Bangladesh–Serbia relations =

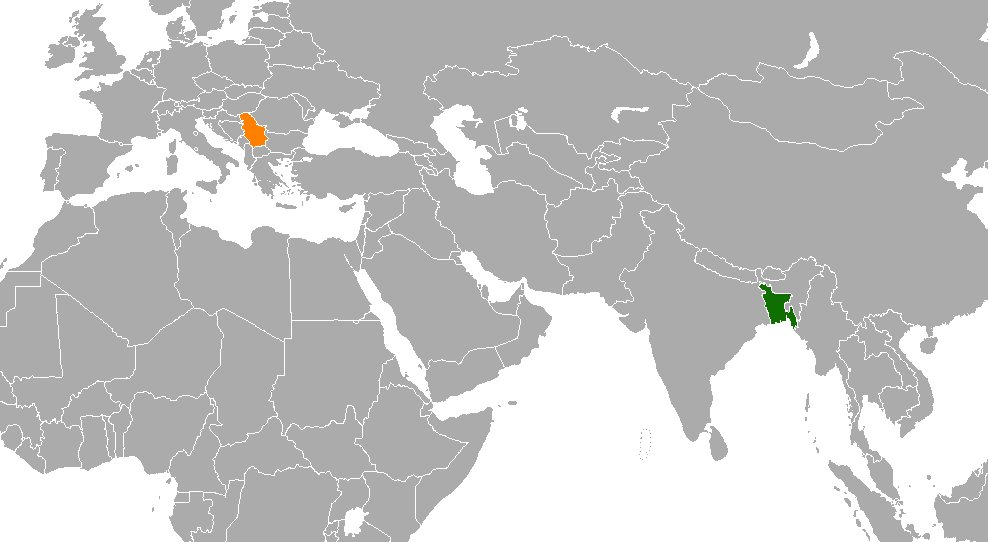

- Bangladesh: Serbia

Bangladesh and Serbia maintain diplomatic relations established between Bangladesh and SFR Yugoslavia in 1971. From 1971 to 2006, Bangladesh maintained relations with the Socialist Federal Republic of Yugoslavia (SFRY) and the Federal Republic of Yugoslavia (FRY) (later Serbia and Montenegro), of which Serbia is considered shared (SFRY) or sole (FRY) legal successor.

== Economic relations ==
Bangladesh and Serbia have shown their mutual interest to expand the bilateral economic activities between the two countries. Serbia has expressed its interest to form joint ventures with Bangladeshi companies for increasing bilateral trade and investments. Bangladeshi pharmaceutical products, textile items, ready made garments and leather goods have been identified as products with good potential in the Serbian market.

== Diplomatic missions ==
- Bangladesh is represented in Serbia through its embassy in Rome (Italy).
- Serbia is represented in Bangladesh through its embassy in New Delhi (India).

== See also ==
- Foreign relations of Bangladesh
- Foreign relations of Serbia
- Yugoslavia and the Non-Aligned Movement
