= Bangladesh–Denmark relations =

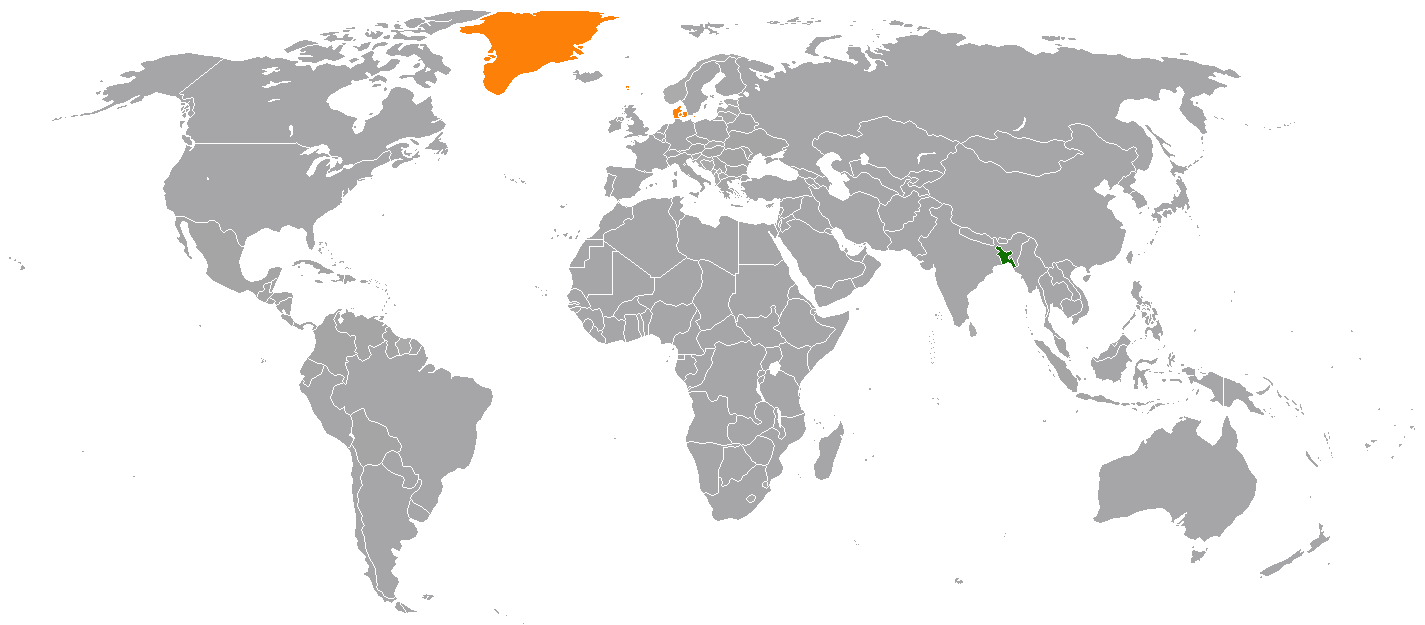

- Bangladesh: Denmark

Bangladesh–Denmark relations are foreign relations between Bangladesh and Denmark. Denmark has an embassy in Dhaka while Bangladesh is represented through its embassy in Stockholm, Sweden.

== Development assistance ==
Bangladesh has benefited from Danish development assistance since its independence in 1971. Danish development helps Bangladesh with overland and water transport, agriculture, fisheries and rural development.

Denmark supports human rights and civil society in Bangladesh.

== Agreements ==
In 1975, an agreement on boat building and mechanization was signed. In 1978, both countries signed an agreement on a fish marketing scheme.

== See also ==
- Foreign relations of Bangladesh
- Foreign relations of Denmark
