= Bangladesh–Botswana relations =

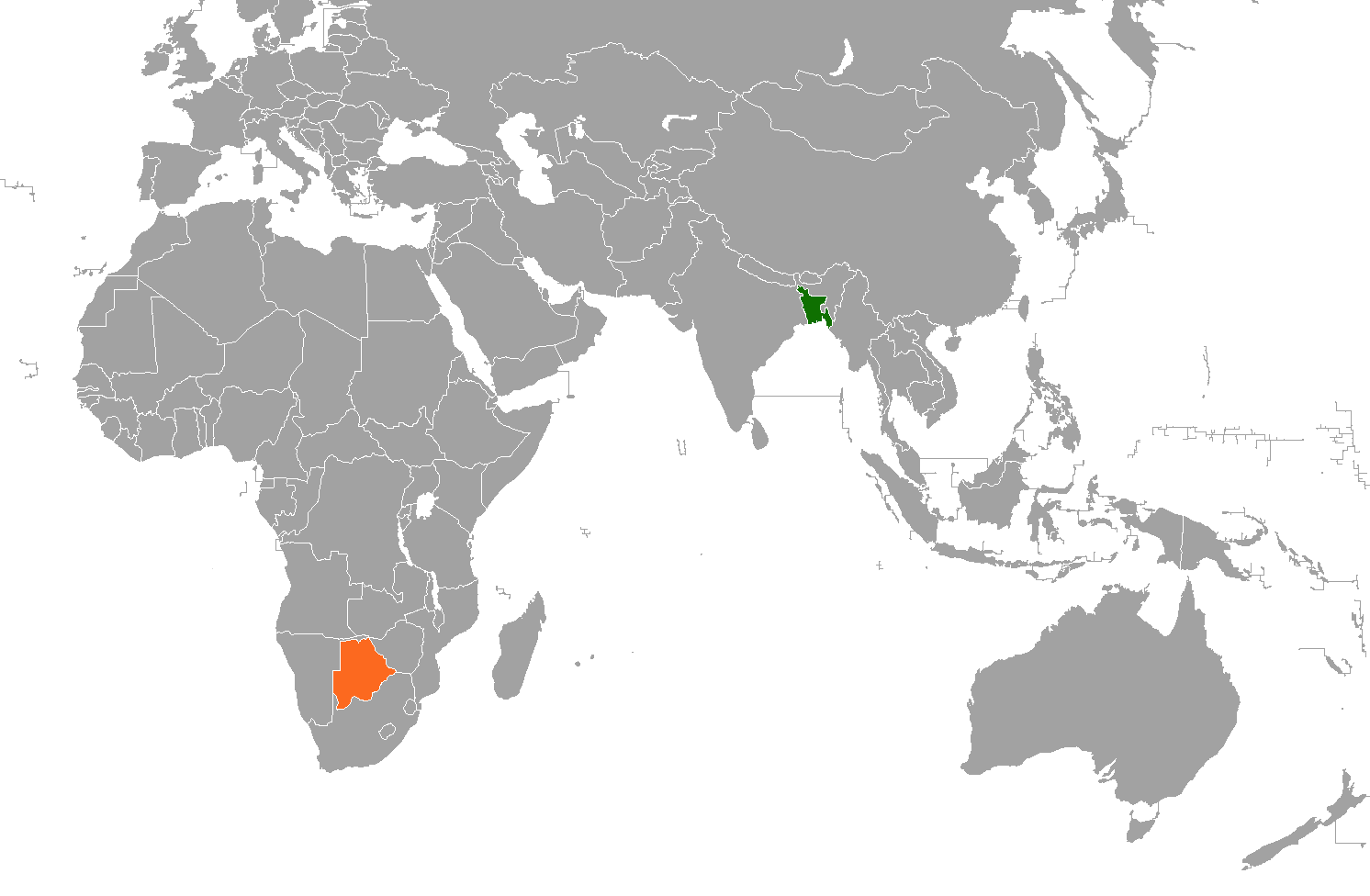

- Bangladesh: Botswana

Bangladesh–Botswana relations refer to the bilateral relations of Bangladesh and Botswana. Neither country has a resident high commissioner. Both countries are members of the Commonwealth of Nations and Non-Aligned Movement.

== Economic cooperation ==
Bangladesh and Botswana have shown interest to expand bilateral economic activities and have been taking steps in this regard. Botswana has urged Bangladesh to set up joint venture textile industries in the country. Botswana has also sought Bangladesh's assistance in developing its pharmaceutical sector. In 2009, a business delegation from Bangladesh led by former president of Bangladesh Knitwear Manufacturers and Exporters Association (BKMEA) Fazlul Haque visited Botswana to explore potential ways for increasing bilateral trade and investment. In the same year, an MoU was signed between Bangladesh and Botswana to promote collaboration in capacity building, exchange of economic and commercial information, export development, image building and investment on small medium and micro enterprises (SMME). In 2013, another delegation from the Commerce Ministry of Bangladesh paid an official visit to Botswana.

== Other cooperation ==
Botswana has proposed to sign an agreement in the fields of sports and culture with Bangladesh. Former President of Botswana, Festus Gontebanye Mogae expressed his desire to have Bangladesh's support and cooperation in developing the quality of cricket of Botswana. Botswana has also stressed on the employment of Bangladeshi agriculturists in Botswana to develop its agricultural sector.

== Bangladeshi diaspora ==
About 20,000 Bangladeshi workers including doctors, nurses and engineers were legally employed in Botswana as of 2013.

== See also ==
- Foreign relations of Bangladesh
- Foreign relations of Botswana
