= Bangladesh–Panama relations =

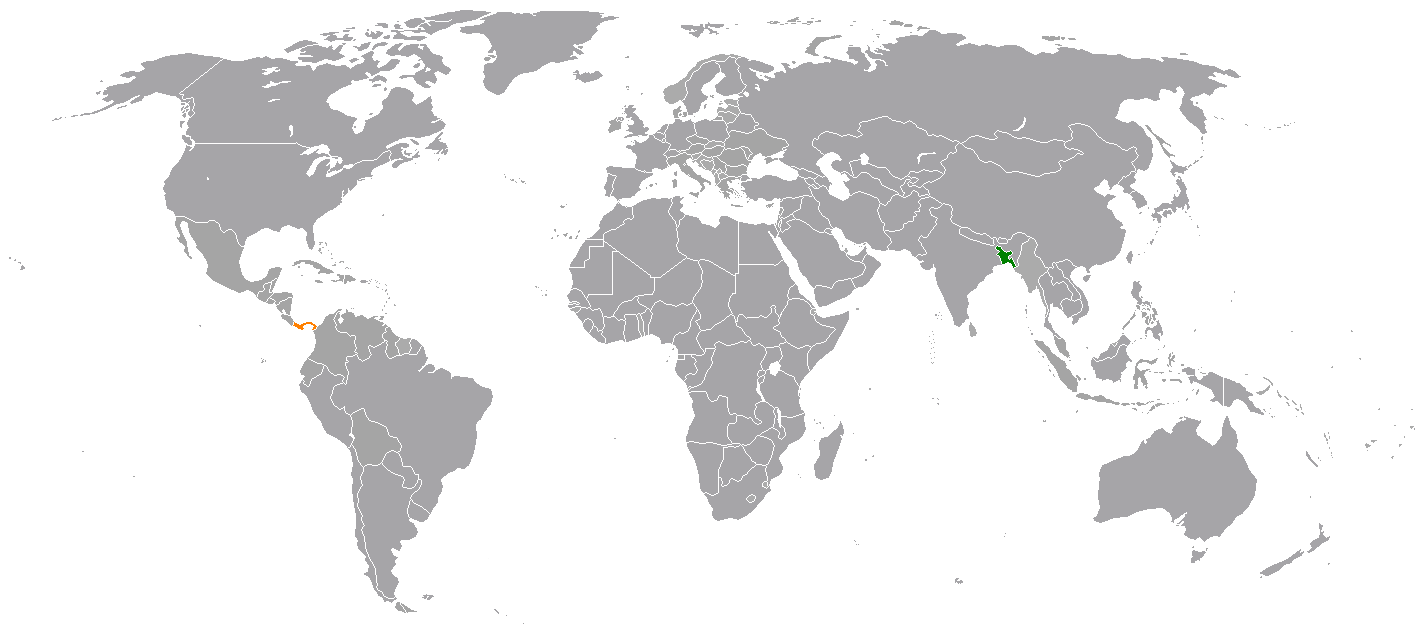

- Bangladesh: Panama

Bangladesh–Panama relations refer to the bilateral relations between Bangladesh and Panama. Both countries enjoy cordial relations with intentions to expand them further. Neither country has a resident ambassador. Both Bangladesh and Panama have expressed deep interest in strengthening the bilateral economic activities. In 2011, a Bangladeshi business delegation coordinated by the commerce ministry paid a visit to Panama to explore potential ways for expanding bilateral trade and investment.

== History ==
Former foreign secretary of Bangladesh Mohamed Mijarul Quayes paid an official visit to Panama City in 2011.

In 1977, Bangladesh supported Panama in the handover of Panama Canal from United States to Panama through the Torrijos–Carter Treaties.

Because of Panama's vast experience in international shipping services, Bangladesh has sought Panama's assistance in this sector. In 2013, Bangladesh and Panama signed a bilateral agreement through which Bangladeshi seamen were granted job opportunities in Panama's shipping sector.

== See also ==
- Foreign relations of Bangladesh
- Foreign relations of Panama
