= Bangladesh–Malawi relations =

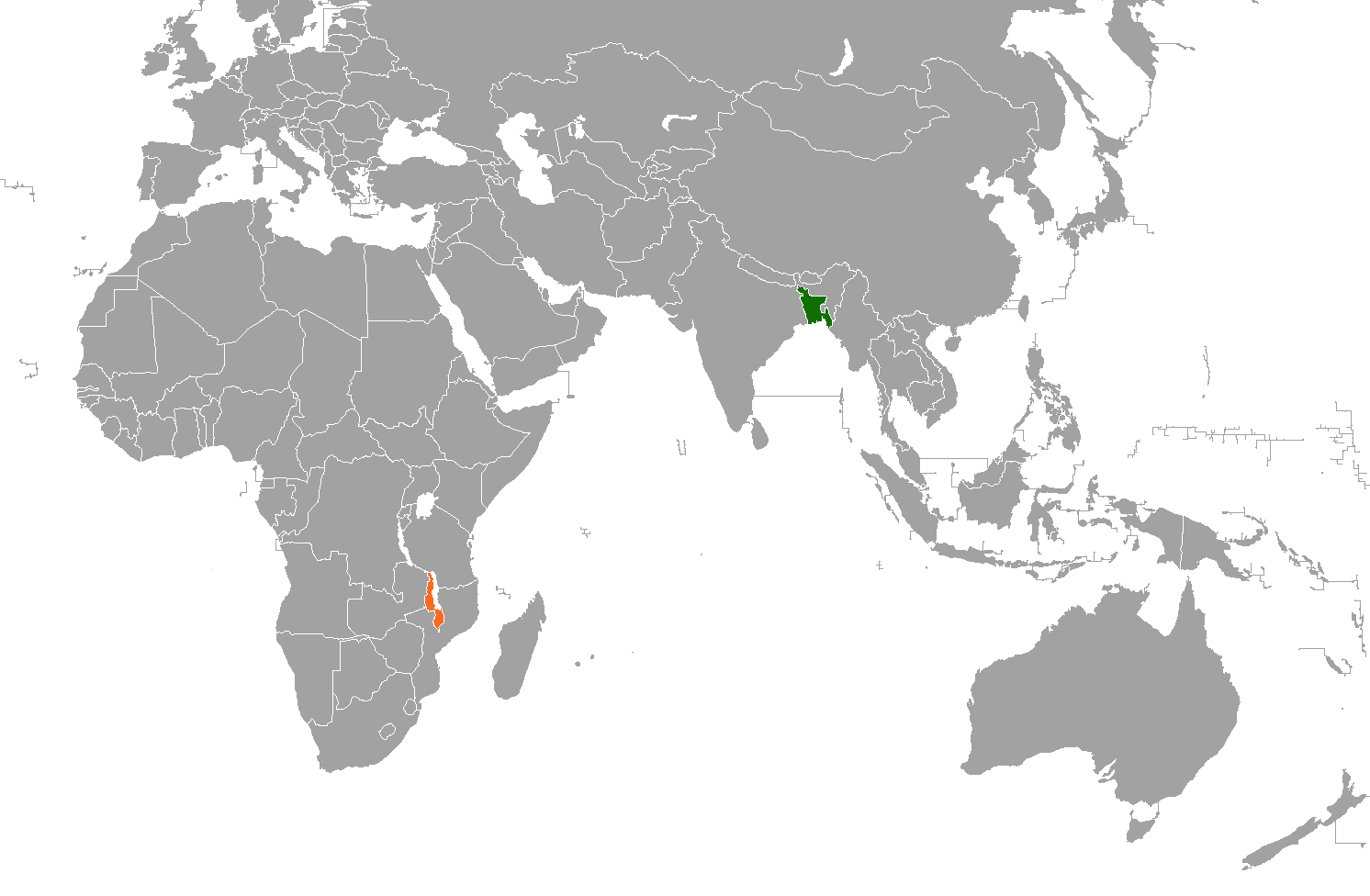

- Bangladesh: Malawi

Bangladesh–Malawi relations are the bilateral relations between Bangladesh and Malawi. Neither country has a resident ambassador. Diplomatic relations between the two countries were officially established in 2012, primarily due to former Malawian President Bingu wa Mutharika's desire to build strong relations with Bangladesh. Both the countries are members of Group of 77, Non-Aligned Movement and Commonwealth of Nations.

== Areas of cooperation ==
Trade and social development have been identified as potential areas of cooperation. As Malawi is a major producer of cotton which is an essential raw material for Bangladesh's textile industry, Bangladesh is keen to invest in Malawi in this sector. Bangladesh's progress in social development sectors like women empowerment and poverty reduction has been identified as a role model for Malawi to replicate.

== See also ==
- Foreign relations of Bangladesh
- Foreign relations of Malawi
