= Bangladesh–Slovakia relations =

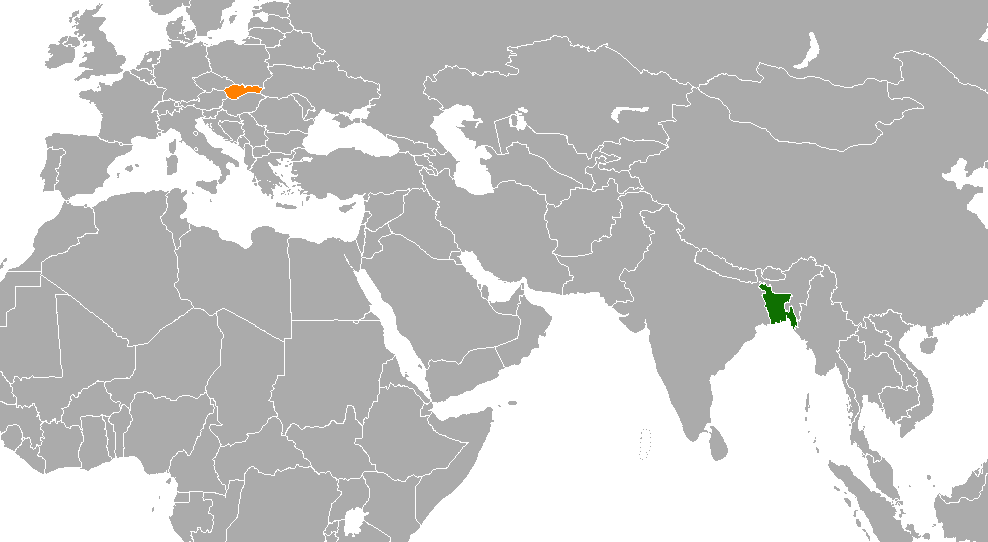

- Bangladesh: Slovakia

Bangladesh–Slovakia relations refer to the bilateral relations between Bangladesh and Slovakia. Neither country has a resident ambassador. The diplomatic relations officially started in 1993.

== Meetings and visits ==
In 1996, the Bangladesh ambassador to Slovakia met with the Slovak Minister for Culture to discuss an agreement on cultural cooperation.

In 1999, Prime Minister of Bangladesh Sheikh Hasina paid an official visit to Bratislava.

== International cooperation ==
Bangladesh and Slovakia have been supporting each other in global forums. In 2010, Slovakia supported Bangladesh's candidature in CEDAW. Bangladesh and Slovakia also agreed to hold regular foreign office consultation. In 2011, former Slovak President Ivan Gašparovič appreciated Bangladesh's position in South Asia.

== Cultural and educational cooperation ==
Slovakia has expressed interest in providing higher education scholarships to Bangladeshi students. The two countries also agreed to sign "fresh agreements on culture, science and technology and other areas of cooperation in line with the old pacts between Bangladesh and Czechoslovakia".

== Economic cooperation ==
Bangladesh and Slovakia have sought to expand trade. In 2010, the two countries drafted an agreement to strengthen the bilateral trade and investment. Bangladeshi export to Slovakia stood at more than 100 million Euros in 2011 which has been termed significant considering the small population of Slovakia. Most of the Bangladeshi export items are related to apparel products. Bangladeshi jute, leather and leather products, ceramics and pharmaceuticals have been identified as promising export items to Slovak market. Slovakia's export items to Bangladesh were dominated by chemical products. Bangladesh and Slovakia have also been discussing the possibility of forming a Joint Business Council to further explore business opportunities.

== Resident diplomatic missions ==
- Bangladesh is accredited to Slovakia from its embassy in Vienna, Austria.
- Slovakia is accredited to Bangladesh from its embassy in New Delhi, India.

== See also ==
- Foreign relations of Bangladesh
- Foreign relations of Slovakia
