= Bangladesh–Venezuela relations =

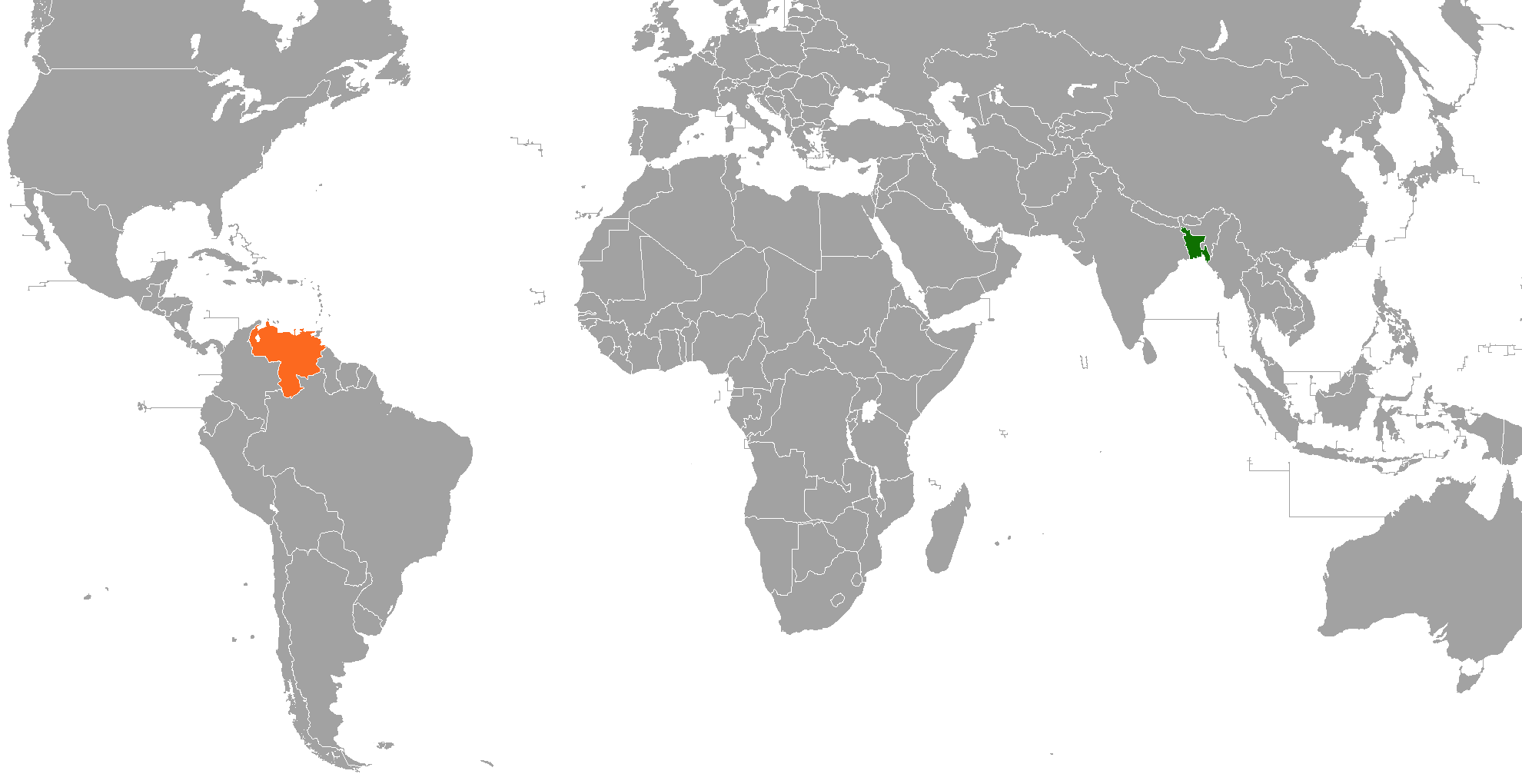

- Bangladesh: Venezuela

Bangladesh–Venezuela relations are the bilateral relations between Bangladesh and Venezuela. Neither country has a resident ambassador. Bangladesh is represented by its ambassador in Brasília.

== High level visits ==
In 2001, President Hugo Chávez became the first Venezuelan head of state to pay an official visit to Dhaka.

== Cooperation ==
=== International forums ===
Bangladesh and Venezuela have been supporting each other at various global forums. In 2006, Venezuela sought Bangladesh's support for its candidature at the United Nations Security Council election for a non-permanent seat. Bangladesh, in return, promised to give due consideration to the request. In 2014, Venezuela assured to support Bangladesh's candidature for Convention on the Elimination of All Forms of Discrimination against Women.

=== Social sectors ===
Inspired by Bangladesh's successes in primary education, women's empowerment, and child and maternal health sectors, Venezuela replicated many social programs of Bangladesh to improve its social indicators. Government of Venezuela has also adopted the microcredit programs of Bangladesh-based Grameen Bank to help eradicate poverty.

=== Economy ===
Both the countries have expressed their interest to strengthen the bilateral economic ties. The need for exchange of business delegations between the two countries have been stressed to explore potential areas for bilateral trade and investment. The energy sector have been identified as a potential field for extensive economic cooperation between Bangladesh and Venezuela. Bangladesh has also sought direct investment from Venezuelan enterprises.

== See also ==
- Foreign relations of Bangladesh
- Foreign relations of Venezuela
