= Bangladesh–Laos relations =

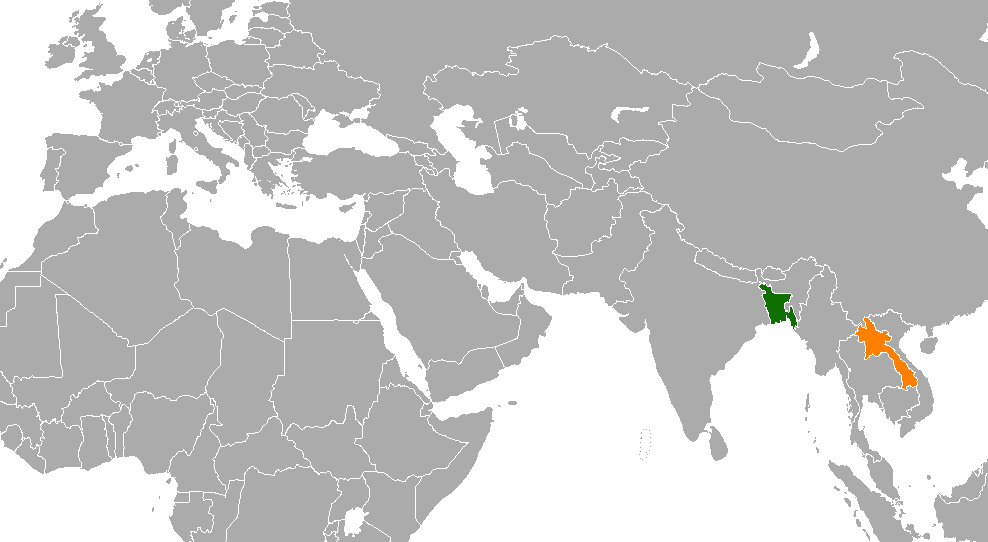

- Bangladesh: Laos

Diplomatic relations between Bangladesh and Laos officially began in 1988. Neither country has a resident ambassador.

== High level visits ==
Bangladeshi Prime Minister Sheikh Hasina paid an official visit to Vientiane in 2012.

== Cooperation on international stage ==
Bangladesh and Laos have been supporting each other at various international forums. In 2012, Laos supported Bangladesh's inclusion in ASEM. They are both part of China's One Belt One Road Initiative.

== Economic cooperation ==
Bangladeshi medicines, cement, ceramic, light engineering products, leather, steel and agro-products have been identified as products with huge demand in Laos. Lack of proper transport links has been one of the major problems for expanding the bilateral trade between the two countries. Both the countries are working towards solving the transport problem and are in process to join the Asian Highway Network which would solve the problems.

== See also ==
- Foreign relations of Bangladesh
- Foreign relations of Laos
