= Bangladesh–Hungary relations =

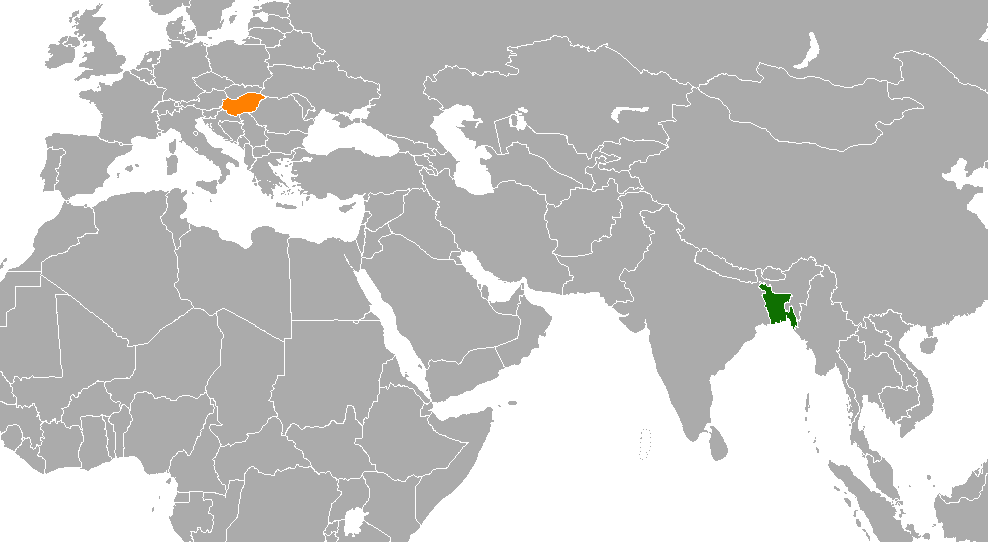

- Bangladesh: Hungary

Bangladesh–Hungary relations are the bilateral relations between Bangladesh and Hungary. Their bilateral relations have been considered cordial, with both countries working towards further strengthening them. Neither country has a resident ambassador.

== Educational cooperation ==
Bangladesh and Hungary have been cooperating with each other in the education sector. Hungary has been providing scholarships to Bangladeshi students. Both the countries have stressed the need for exchange in the education sector.

== Economic cooperation ==
Bangladesh and Hungary have shown their interest in expanding the bilateral economic activities and have been undertaking necessary steps to ensure it. Bangladeshi jute and jute products, leather and leather products, ceramics, pharmaceuticals and ready made garments have been identified as products with huge potential in the Hungarian market. Hungarian businesses have expressed their interest to invest in Bangladesh and have sent their delegations to explore potential ways for the improvement of bilateral trade and investment between the two countries.

== Migrants ==
Asylum seekers and Migrants from Bangladesh along with others from countries in Asia and Africa use Hungary as a transit country to reach Western Europe and Scandinavian countries. Few have settled in Hungary. The UNHCR used a Bangladesh family in campaign to promote multiculturalism and migrants in Hungary.

== Resident diplomatic missions ==
- Bangladesh is accredited to Hungary from its embassy in Vienna, Austria.
- Hungary is accredited to Bangladesh from its embassy in New Delhi, India.

== See also ==
- Foreign relations of Bangladesh
- Foreign relations of Hungary
