= Bangladesh–Chile relations =

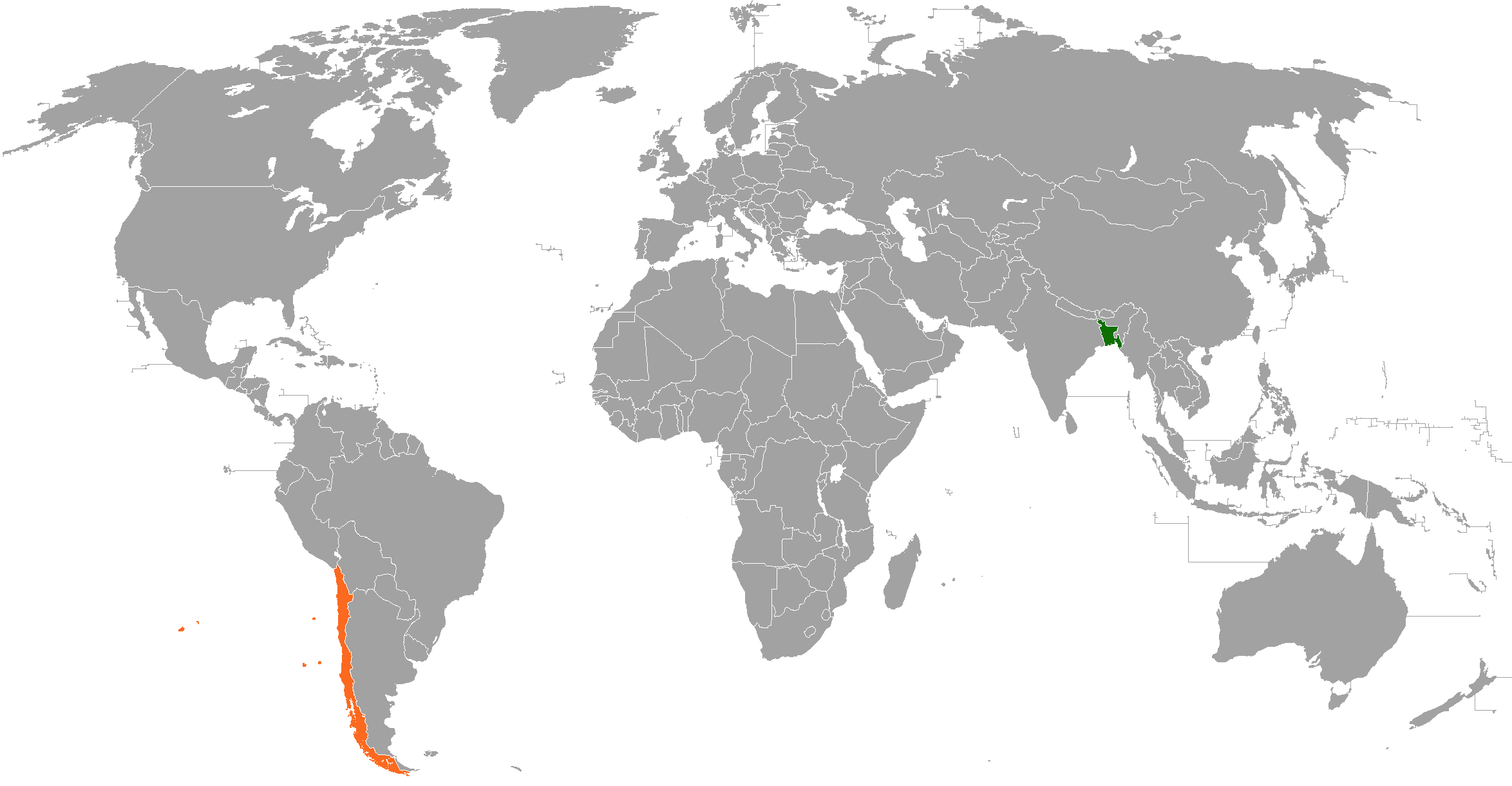

- Bangladesh: Chile

Bangladesh–Chile relations refer to the diplomatic relations between Bangladesh and Republic of Chile. Both countries are members of Group of 77 and Non-Aligned Movement.

== High level visits ==
In 2011, former foreign secretary of Bangladesh Mohamed Mijarul Quayes paid an official visit to Chile.

== Economic cooperation ==
Bangladesh and Chile have always expressed their interest to expand bilateral trade. Because of its strategic location, Chile has been identified as an important market for the expansion of Bangladeshi products in Latin America. Many Bangladeshi companies have entered the Chilean market, the most prominent being Beximco Pharmaceuticals which, after entering the Chilean market, became the first Bangladeshi pharmaceutical company in 2008 to obtain product registration in any Latin American country.

According to a report published by Chilean foreign ministry's General Directorate of International Economic Relations in 2012, Bangladesh was among the leading Asian destinations for Chilean investment.

In 2013, Chile granted duty-free and quota-free access to the Bangladeshi products in order to strengthen bilateral trade between the two countries. The bilateral trade between the two countries stands at $30.37 million as of June 2013, with all of the trade accounting for Bangladeshi export to Chile. About 93% of the Bangladeshi export to Chile was of textiles and ready made garments. The rest included jute yarn, jute fabrics, foot wears, caps and pharmaceuticals products.

== Resident diplomatic missions ==
- Bangladesh is accredited to Chile from its embassy in New Delhi, India.
- Chile is accredited to Bangladesh from its embassy in Brasília, Brazil.

== See also ==
- Foreign relations of Bangladesh
- Foreign relations of Chile
