= Bangladesh–Bulgaria relations =

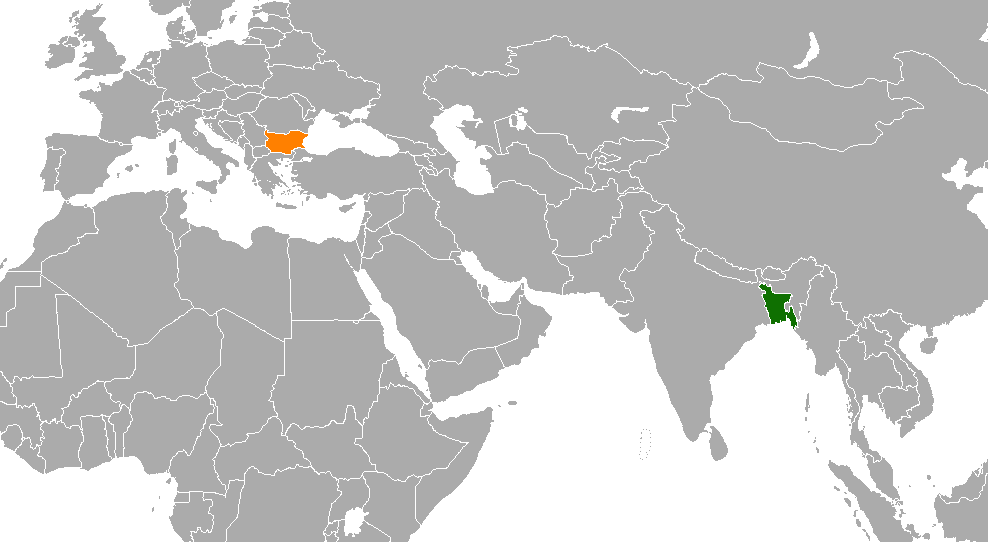

- Bangladesh: Bulgaria

Bangladesh–Bulgaria relations refers to the bilateral relations between Bangladesh and Bulgaria. Relations between the two countries have been regarded as cordial with both the nations showing willingness to strengthen it further. Bulgaria was one of the few countries that recognized Bangladesh soon after its independence in 1971. Neither country has a resident ambassador.

== Cooperation ==
Agriculture, technology and cultural activities are all potential avenues for the advancement of bilateral cooperation. In 2014, Bangladesh and Bulgaria signed an MoU on Foreign Office Consultation to hold regular consultations between both governments in the areas of mutual cooperation.

== Economic relations ==
Bangladesh and Bulgaria have shown mutual interest to expand the bilateral economic activities between the two regions and have been working toward this end. Bangladeshi ready made garments, leather and jute products, ceramic and pharmaceuticals have been identified as having huge potential in Bulgarian market. Besides, ready made garments, textile, energy, petroleum, leather, ceramic, pharmaceuticals and aggro-processing industries have been identified as potential sector where Bulgarian entrepreneurs could invest.

== See also ==
- Foreign relations of Bangladesh
- Foreign relations of Bulgaria
