= Bangladesh–United Arab Emirates relations =

- Bangladesh: United Arab Emirates

Bangladesh–United Arab Emirates relations refer to the bilateral relations between Bangladesh and United Arab Emirates.

== History ==
Muhammad Imran is the resident ambassador of Bangladesh to UAE. In 2014 Bangladesh announced visa on arrival for UAE nationals. UAE has announced golden visa for bangladeshis working there and visiting.

== Economic ==
As of December 2016, there are an estimated 700,000 thousand Bangladeshi migrants in UAE. Trade between the Bangladesh and UAE stood at 967 million dollar in the 2012-2013 period. UAE has investments of $2.9 billion in Bangladesh.

== See also ==
- Foreign relations of Bangladesh
- Foreign relations of the United Arab Emirates
