= Bangladesh–Mali relations =

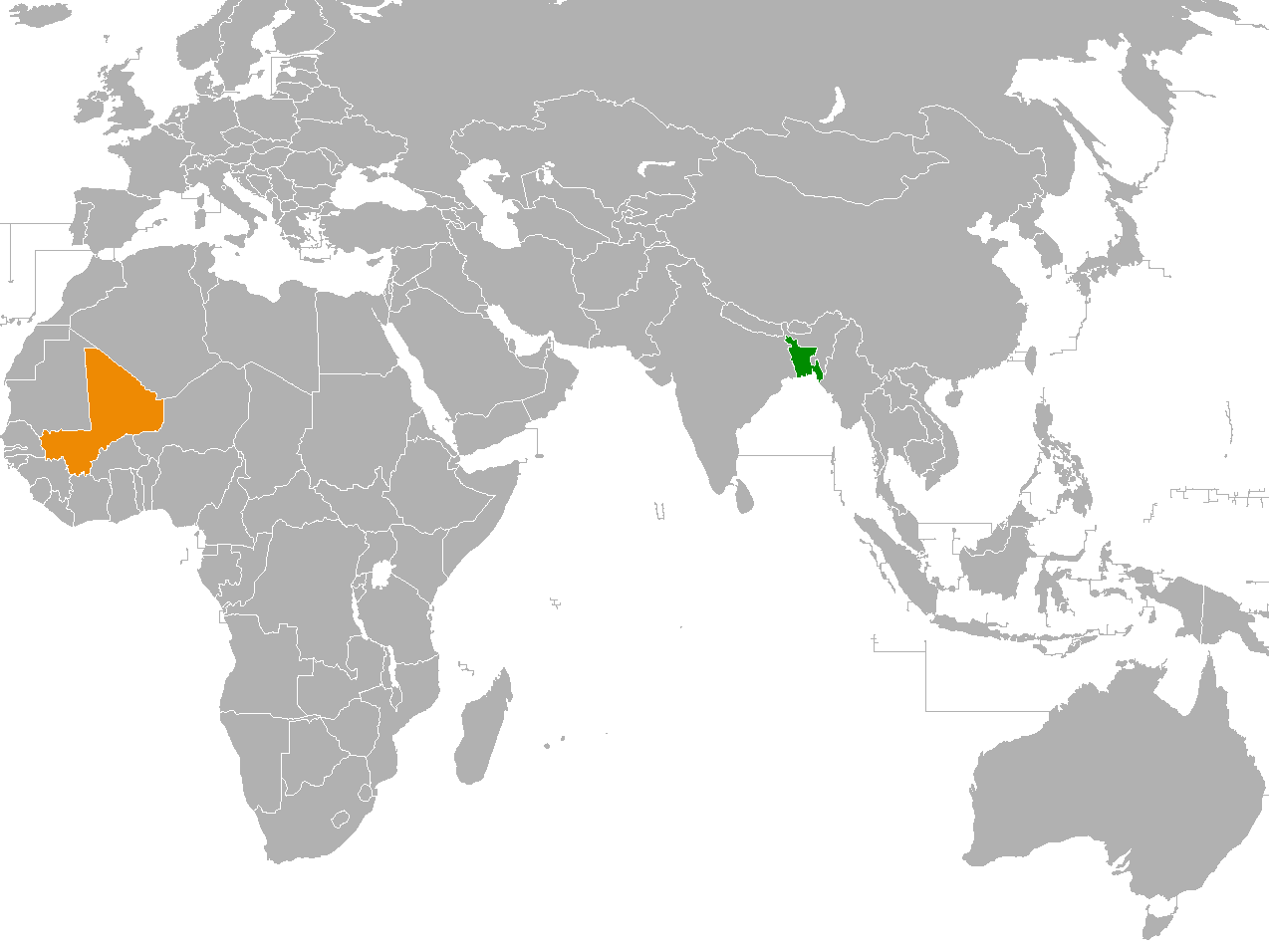

- Bangladesh: Mali

Bangladesh–Mali relations refer to the bilateral relations between Bangladesh and Mali.

Both countries are members of Non-Aligned Movement and Organisation of Islamic Cooperation.

== Peacekeeping operations in Mali ==
As part of the United Nations Multidimensional Integrated Stabilization Mission in Mali, Bangladeshi peacekeepers have been deployed in Mali since April 2014, when the first contingent of 112 Bangladesh Army personnels left Dhaka for Mali. Ultimately six Bangladeshi contingents will be deployed in the mission through phases, consisting of 1,446 personnels. The contingents include a battalion of Bangladesh Army and a naval unit. Besides, two signal units, one engineering unit and one transport unit will also be serving in the mission.

== Economic relations ==
Bangladesh and Mali have shown mutual interest in expanding their bilateral trade and investments. Mali has shown keen interest to import fertilizer from Bangladesh. On the other hand, as Mali is a large producer of cotton, Bangladesh expressed its deep interest to import huge quantity of cotton for its large textile industry. Bangladeshi garments, pharmaceuticals, jute and tea have been identified as potential products in the Malian market. The need for the exchange of business delegations between the two countries have been stressed to strengthen the bilateral economic relations. Besides, formation of a joint economic council have been proposed.

In 2014, Bangladesh Tariff Commission prepared a feasibility study for the benefits of signing new Free/Preferential trade agreements with African states and recommended that Mali along with Nigeria are the most promising countries for signing such agreements.

== Diplomatic missions ==
Neither country has a resident embassy or consulate in each other's territory. The Malian embassy in New Delhi has non-resident accreditation to Bangladesh.

== See also ==
- Foreign relations of Bangladesh
- Foreign relations of Mali
