= Like-Minded Developing Countries =

Negotiating block at UN and WTO

The Like-Minded Group of Developing Countries (LMDC) is a group of developing countries who organise themselves as a block of negotiators in international organizations such as the United Nations and the World Trade Organization, they represent more than 50% of the world's population.

According to a statement by the Chinese diplomat Sha Zukang in 2005, the member countries of the Like Minded Group are Algeria, Bangladesh, Belarus, Bhutan, China, Cuba, Egypt, India, Indonesia, Iran, Malaysia, Myanmar, Nepal, Pakistan, the Philippines, Sri Lanka, Sudan, Syria, Vietnam, and Zimbabwe.

However, following the LMDC countries who negotiate in the United Nations Framework Convention on Climate Change fora, the members are Algeria, Bangladesh, Bolivia, China, Cuba, Ecuador, Egypt, El Salvador, India, Indonesia, Iran, Iraq, Jordan, Kuwait, Malaysia, Mali, Nicaragua, Pakistan, Saudi Arabia, Sri Lanka, Sudan, Syria, Venezuela and Vietnam.

== Members ==
- Algeria
- Bangladesh
- Bolivia
- China
- Cuba
- Ecuador
- Egypt
- El Salvador
- India
- Indonesia
- Iran
- Iraq
- Jordan
- Kuwait
- Malaysia
- Mali
- Nicaragua
- Pakistan
- Saudi Arabia
- Sri Lanka
- Sudan
- Syrian Arab Republic
- Venezuela
- Vietnam
