= Bangladesh–Ghana relations =

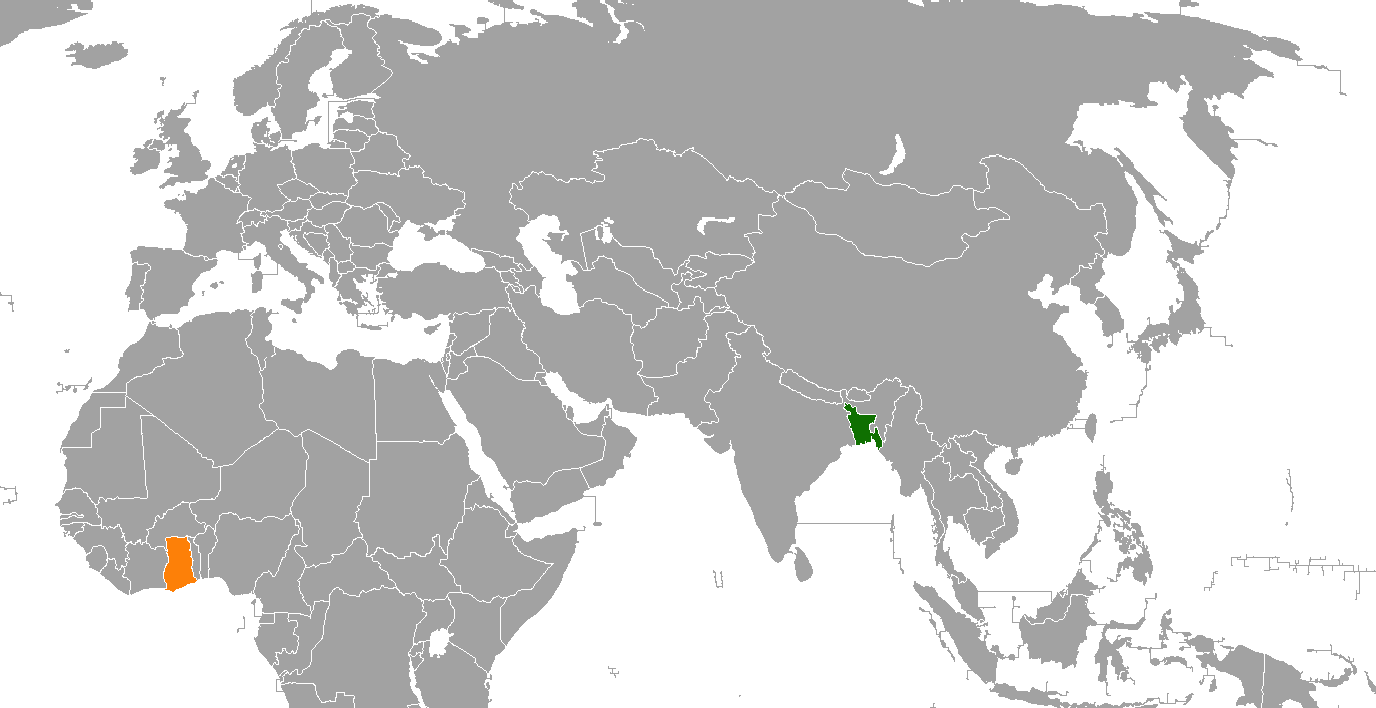

- Bangladesh: Ghana

Bangladesh–Ghana relations refer to the bilateral relations between Bangladesh and Ghana. Neither country has a resident ambassador. Bangladesh and Ghana enjoys warm diplomatic relations and both are interested to strengthen them further.

== High level visits ==
In 2010, former foreign secretary Mohamed Mijarul Quayes paid an official visit to Accra.

== Economic cooperation ==
Both the countries have been exchanging business and official delegations and have been holding trade fairs to boost the bilateral economic cooperation. In 2012, a high-profile Bangladeshi business delegation led by Shubhashish Bose, Vice Chairman of Bangladesh Export Promotion Bureau, visited Ghana to explore ways for expanding bilateral trade between Bangladesh and Ghana. Bangladeshi investors have shown their interest to invest in Ghana because of its strategic location in West Africa and steady economic growth. Bangladeshi products especially the ready made garments and pharmaceuticals have been identified as products with huge potential in the Ghanaian market.

== Cultural exchange ==
Many Ghanaian footballers regularly play for various major Bangladeshi football clubs. Bangladesh has now become a major destination for Ghanaian footballers willing to play overseas.
