= Bangladesh–Belarus relations =

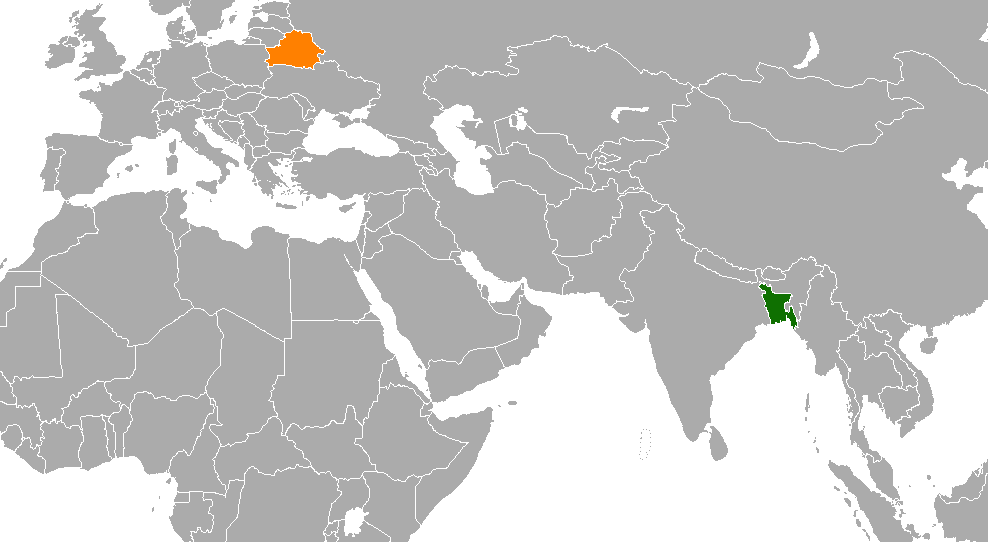

- Bangladesh: Belarus

The Byelorussian Soviet Socialist Republic recognized Bangladesh's independence on 24 January 1972. Official diplomatic relations between Bangladesh and Belarus were established in 1992. Neither country has a resident ambassador.

Belarusian businessman Aliaksandr Shakutsin is the honorary consul of Bangladesh in Belarus.

== High level visits ==
Relations witnessed a significant boost when Belarus Prime Minister Mikhail Myasnikovich visited Bangladesh in November 2012. Prime Minister of Bangladesh Sheikh Hasina visited the Republic of Belarus on 8 July 2013.

== Cooperation ==
The two countries have signed agreements for cooperation on various fields such as trade, education, agriculture, technology and defence.

== Aid ==
The Belarusian government will provide $15 million to Bangladesh as long-term assistance for the development of country's readymade garment (RMG) sector.

== Trade ==
The first agreement on trade and economic cooperation between the two countries was signed in 2007 aimed at expanding bilateral trade. A more comprehensive agreement was reached in May 2012 when a Bangladesh delegation led by former foreign minister Dipu Moni paid a visit to Minsk. Titled "Intergovernmental agreement on trade and economic cooperation", the agreement proved to be effective when the amount of bilateral trade grew rapidly in 2013.

== Defence ==
Military cooperation between the two countries dates back to 2005. It received major reinforcements through an agreement on transfer of crucial defence technologies which was signed by the two countries during Mikhail Myasnikovich's official visit to Dhaka in 2012. The areas of cooperation in this field include "production and modernisation of military equipment and control, communication and electromagnetic warfare systems.." In 2013, a joint commission was also formed in this regard.
