= Bangladesh–Kyrgyzstan relations =

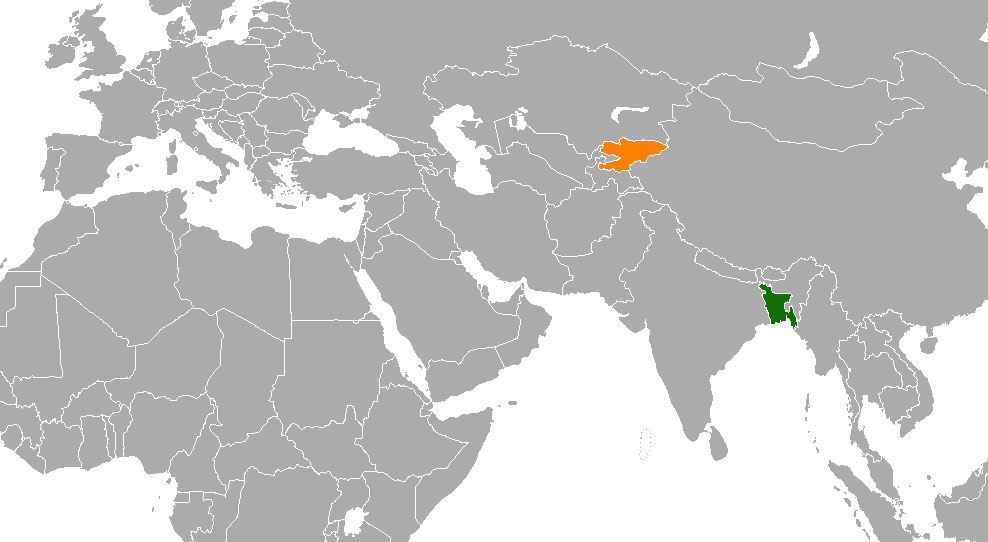

- Bangladesh: Kyrgyzstan

Bangladesh–Kyrgyzstan relations refer to the bilateral relations between Bangladesh and Kyrgyzstan. Relations between the two countries have been described as strong. Neither country has a resident ambassador.

== Education ==
The education sector has been recognised as a potential field for furthering the bilateral cooperation. Kyrgyzstan has shown interest in providing scholarships to Bangladeshi students who intend to pursue higher education.

== Culture ==
Bangladesh and Kyrgyzstan have identified cultural cooperation as an important way of expanding their bilateral ties. In 2014, a memorandum of understanding was signed between the two countries to organise the Days of Culture of Kyrgyzstan in Bangladesh, with the roles reversing in 2015.

== Economy ==
Bangladesh and Kyrgyzstan have both shown a strong interest in expanding bilateral economic activities. Bangladesh has shown interest in importing cotton in bulk from Kyrgyzstan for its textile industry. Ready-made garments, pharmaceuticals, and agricultural products have been identified as potential sectors to increase bilateral trade and investment. The jewelry industry is also promising.

In 2013, a Bangladeshi trade delegation, led by former commerce secretary Mahbub Ahmed, visited Kyrgyzstan to explore potential ways for increasing bilateral trade and investment. The imposition of double taxation has been identified as a hurdle to the expansion of bilateral trade.
