= Bangladesh–Colombia relations =

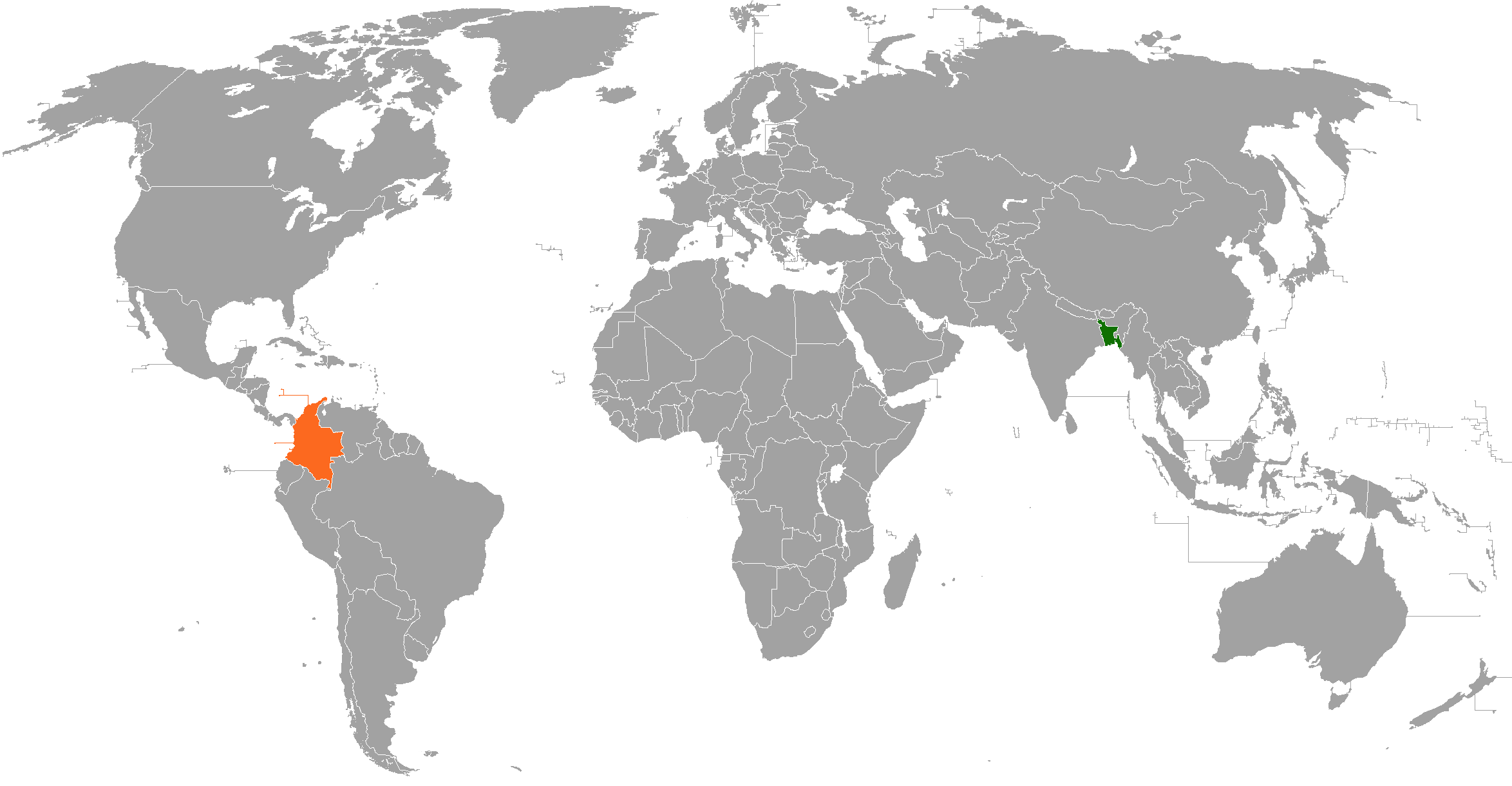

- Bangladesh: Colombia

Bangladesh–Colombia relations refer to the bilateral relations between Bangladesh and Colombia. Colombia and Venezuela jointly recognized Bangladesh on May 2, 1972. Both countries are members of the Non-Aligned Movement. Neither country has a resident ambassador.

== High level visit ==
In 2011, Bangladesh Foreign Secretary Mohamed Mijarul Quayes paid an official visit to Bogotá to explore ways to expand bilateral trade with Colombia.

== Areas of cooperation ==
Some common issues between the two countries such as climate change adaptation, disaster management, and vulnerable group protection have been identified as areas for cooperation. In 2009, Bangladesh President Zillur Rahman called for the transfer of technology between the two countries in the agriculture sector.

== Trade ==
Both countries have expressed their interest in expanding bilateral trade. In 2009, Colombia proposed to sign a memorandum of understanding with Bangladesh to boost bilateral trade and commerce. Bangladeshi apparels, jute products, pharmaceuticals and handicrafts have been identified as potential products with huge demand in Colombia. The two countries have signed a visa waiver agreement to ensure smooth travel of businessmen.

== Religion ==
Colombia has sent priests for the Roman Catholic community of Bangladesh.
