= Bangladesh–Qatar relations =

- Qatar: Bangladesh

Bangladesh–Qatar relations refer to the bilateral relations between Bangladesh and Qatar. Both countries are members of the Organisation of Islamic Cooperation.

== History ==
Bangladesh has an embassy in Doha. The Bangladeshi ambassador is Jashim Uddin. Bangladesh and Qatar agreed to boost defense ties. Qatar Charity runs schools, orphanages and training centres in Bangladesh. In 2014, Women's Association of Bangladesh-Qatar was formed in Doha. Bangladeshs' foreign minister Abul Hassan Mahmud Ali visited Qatar in 2016 to discuss trade and bilateral ties.

== Economic relations ==
Bangladesh signed a deal in November 2013 to import LNG from Qatar with negotiations going back to 2010. Bangladesh exported goods worth 1.8 million dollar in 2013. Bangladeshi newspaper Prothom Alo started weekly publications of its paper in Qatar in October 2014, the first Bangladeshi daily to publish outside the country. In June 2017, Bangladesh signed an agreement with Qatari company QatarEnergy LNG to receive 2.5 million tonnes of LNG annually for the following 15 years. Shipments were to begin in 2018.

== Diaspora ==
In 2015, the largest group of migrant workers from Bangladesh went to Qatar. Approximately 123,000 Bangladeshi expatriates were working in Qatar in 2015, mainly in the construction sector.
