= Bangladesh–Kazakhstan relations =

Bilateral relations between Bangladesh and Kazakhstan

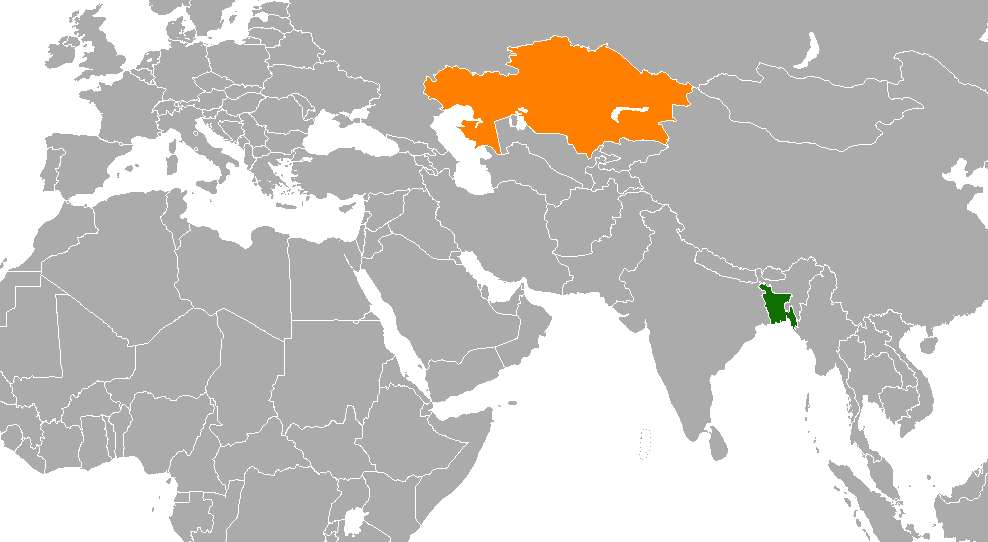

- Bangladesh: Kazakhstan

Bangladesh–Kazakhstan relations refer to the bilateral relations between Bangladesh and Kazakhstan. The Bangladeshi President Iajuddin Ahmed said that the two countries enjoy cordial diplomatic relations and are working towards strengthen it further. Both the countries are members of Organisation of Islamic Cooperation. Neither country has a resident ambassador. In 2009, Kazakhstan announced it intended to open a consulate in Dhaka.

== High level visits ==
Former foreign minister of Bangladesh Dipu Moni paid a visit to Astana in 2012.

== Economic cooperation ==
Both Bangladesh and Kazakhstan are keen to expand bilateral trade and have been undertaking various measures in this regard. Bangladeshi products including jute, jute goods, tea, medicine and garments have been identified as products with high potential in Kazakhstani market. In 2008, the two countries formed joint economic commission to increase the economic activities between the two countries. In 2012, Bangladesh was granted duty-free access to Kazakhstan's market. In 2013, a high level business delegation from Bangladesh, led by former commerce secretary Mahbub Ahmed, paid a visit to Kazakhstan to explore ways for increasing bilateral trade.
