= Bangladesh–Oman relations =

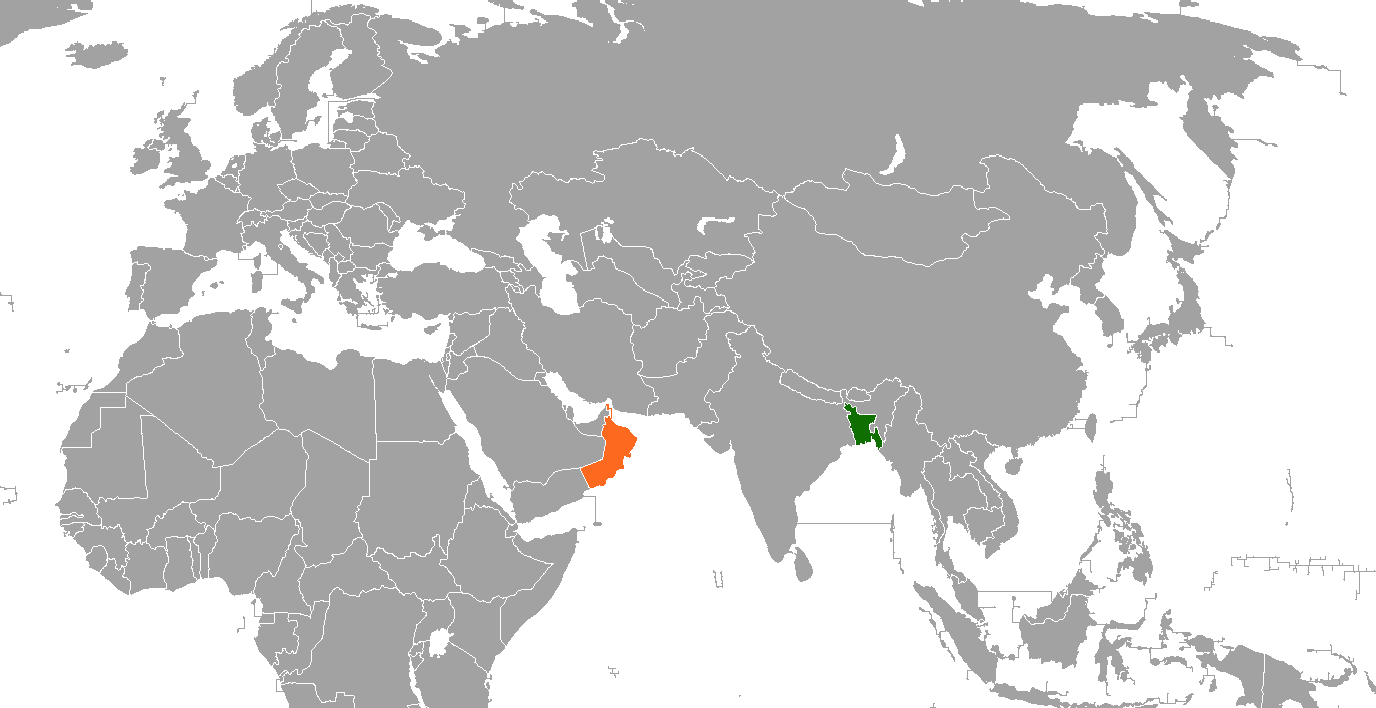

- Bangladesh: Oman

Bilateral relations between Bangladesh and Oman were established in 1983.

== History ==
The Sultanate of Oman recognized Bangladesh in 1974. Bangladesh established her diplomatic mission in Oman in March 1983. Since then the two countries have been maintaining cordial relations. Oman was one of the first Arab countries to extend support to Bangladesh's membership at the UN and other international organizations. Bangladesh upgraded its mission in Oman in 1996 at the level of Ambassador. The Sultanate of Oman established its full-fledged embassy in Dhaka in 2012.

Bangladesh has a resident embassy in Oman. Bangladeshi employees fall under the Kafala system, which bounds them to their employers and according to Human Rights Watch it leaves them vulnerable to abuse. In 2013, some 134,028 Bangladeshi workers entered Oman with different categories of work permits and the Mission remains vigilant in facilitating the process. In 2014, 105,748 Bangladeshis came to Oman on different categories of visas. Approximately US$700 million has been remitted by Bangladeshi expatriates living in Oman during the FY July 2013-June 2014.

=== Diplomatic visits ===
- Dipu Moni, former foreign minister of Bangladesh paid an official visit to Oman from 25 to 26 April 2012. She met with Omani foreign minister Yousuf Bin Alawi Bin Abdullah, Inspector General of Police and Customs Hassan bin Mohseen Al Sheraiqi, Minister of Commerce and Industry Ali bin Masood Al Sunaidi, Minister of Agriculture and Fisheries Fuad bin Jafer Al Sagwani and Minister of Oil and Gas Mohammed Bin Hamad bin Saif Al Rumhi. During bilateral talks, both sides identified agriculture, fisheries, trade and investment as key areas of interest for mutual cooperation. The Omani authorities were further ready to handover a plot in the diplomatic enclave of Muscat, on reciprocal basis, during the visit by Bangladesh Foreign Minister.
- Khandker Mosharraf Hossain visited Oman on 4–9 May 2013 at the invitation of the Omani minister Shaikh Abdullah bin Nasser bin Abdullah Al Bakri.
- A four-member Omani Agriculture Delegation visited Bangladesh in March 2013 to explore opportunities for potential collaboration in the field of agriculture, fisheries and allied sectors.
- An Omani delegation comprising members from the Ministry of Manpower visited Bangladesh in March 2014 to attend the third Joint Committee Meeting under the auspices of the Agreement on Manpower.
- In early 2013, the Omani minister of foreign affairs accepted an invitation by his Bangladeshi counterpart to visit Bangladesh, which was subsequently deferred to a later date.
