= Bangladesh–Trinidad and Tobago relations =

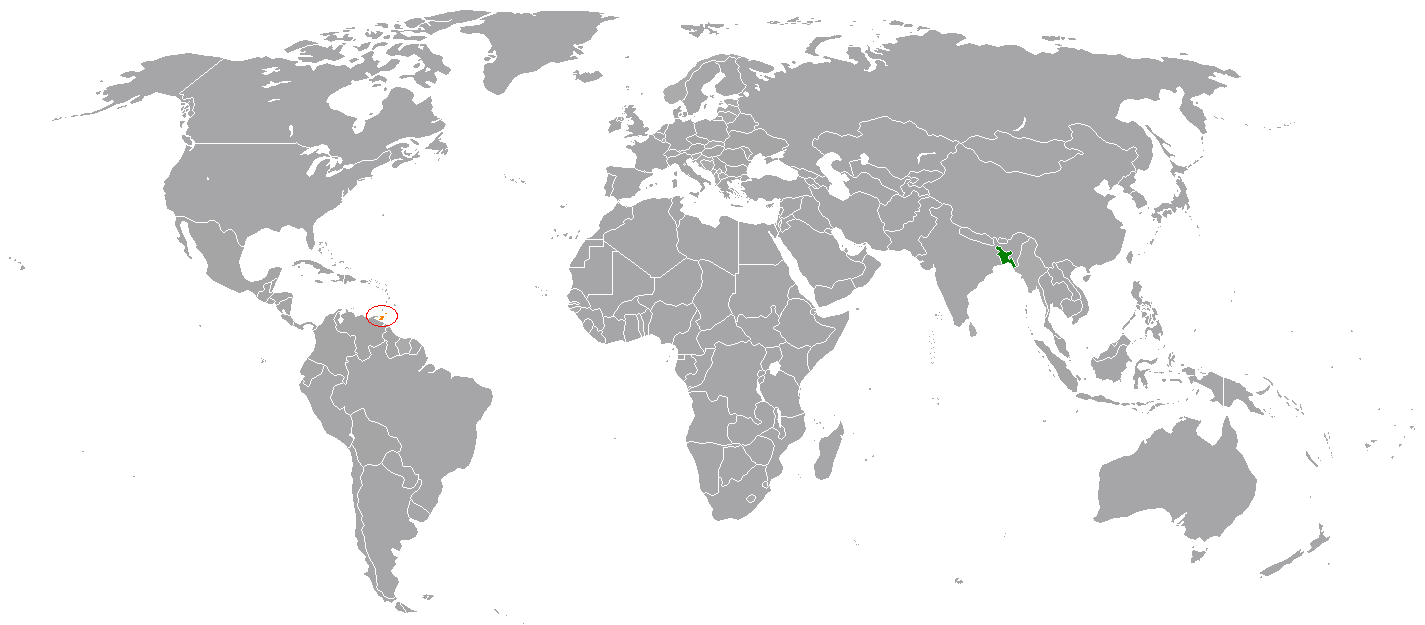

- Bangladesh: Trinidad and Tobago

Bangladesh–Trinidad and Tobago relations refer to the bilateral relations between Bangladesh and Trinidad and Tobago. Neither country has a resident ambassador.

== High level visits ==
Bangladeshi Prime Minister Sheikh Hasina paid an official visit to Port of Spain in 2009.

== Economic cooperation ==
Bangladesh and Trinidad and Tobago have shown interest in expanding the bilateral economic ties and have been cooperating with each other in this regard. Bangladeshi leather products, jute products, ceramics and pharmaceuticals have been identified as having huge potential in Trinidad and Tobago. In 2009, "Bangladesh Trade Center" was established by the Bangladesh Export Promotion Bureau at Port of Spain to facilitate the bilateral trade and investment between Bangladesh and Trinidad and Tobago, as well as the foreign trade of Bangladesh in the greater Caribbean and nearby Latin American markets.
