= Bangladesh–Rwanda relations =

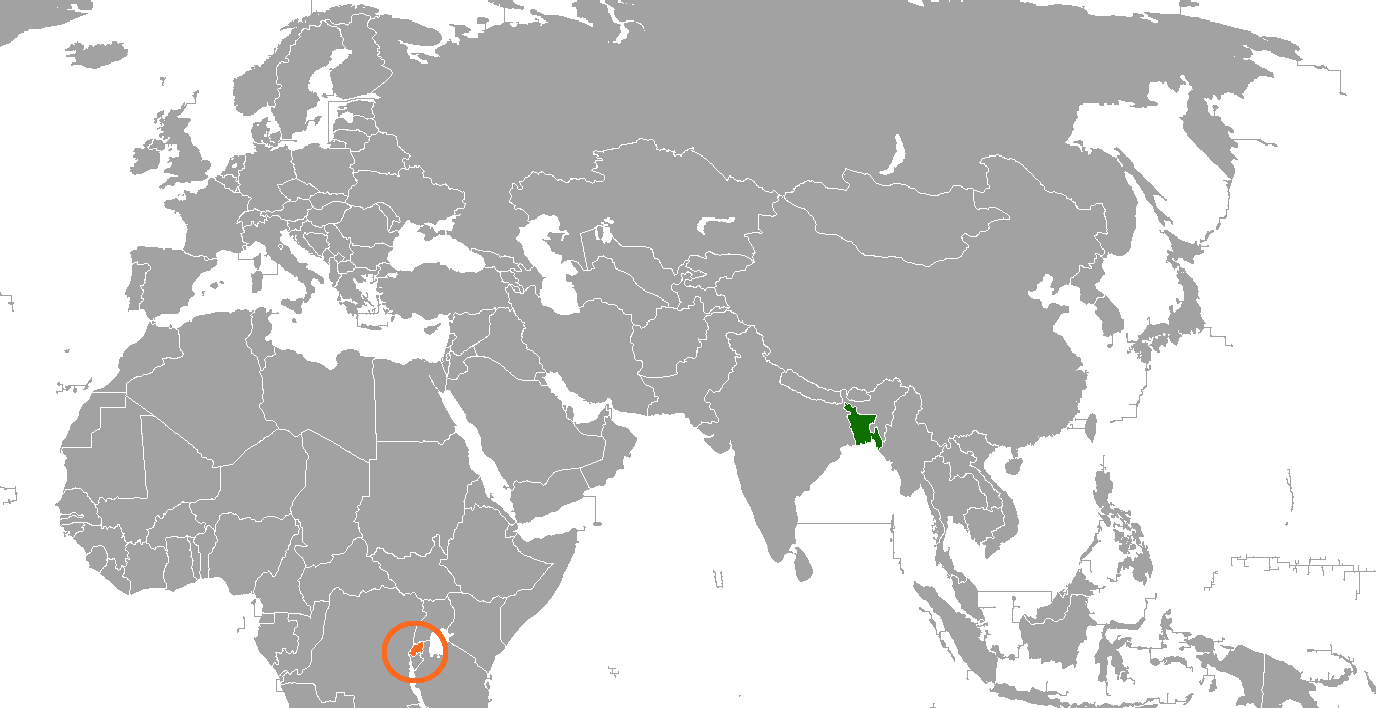

- Bangladesh: Rwanda

Bangladesh–Rwanda relations refer to the bilateral relations between Bangladesh and Rwanda. Both the countries are members of Non-Aligned Movement, Group of 77 and Commonwealth of Nations. Neither country has a resident ambassador.

== History ==
In 1994, Bangladesh provided roughly 900 UN peacekeepers, including soldiers and medical personnel, to Rwanda to aid in keeping the peace during the Rwandan genocide, one of more than 40 countries to do so.

In 2012, there was a delegation sent from Bangladesh to Rwanda. At that time, Rwanda sought investment from Bangladeshi businessmen.

Rwanda is situated at a strategic location in Central Africa which would ensure easier access for Bangladeshi businesses to Central Africa.

Bangladeshi ready-made garments, ceramics and pharmaceutical products have been identified as having huge demand in Rwanda.

Bangladesh's experiences in the areas of mechanized agriculture, food processing, textile, garments, ceramics and shipbuilding industries have also been sought to replicate them in Rwanda.

In 2015, Rwanda expressed hopes to strengthen ties to Bangladesh, including exchanging "trade and investment, textile and jute industry development and exchange of experience, training, and capacity development in international peacekeeping." In response, Bangladesh promised to arrange a visit to Rwanda in the first quarter of 2015 as part of an ongoing effort to strengthen ties between the two nations.
