= List of diplomatic missions of Bangladesh =

Embassies, High Commissions & Consulates of Bangladesh worldwide

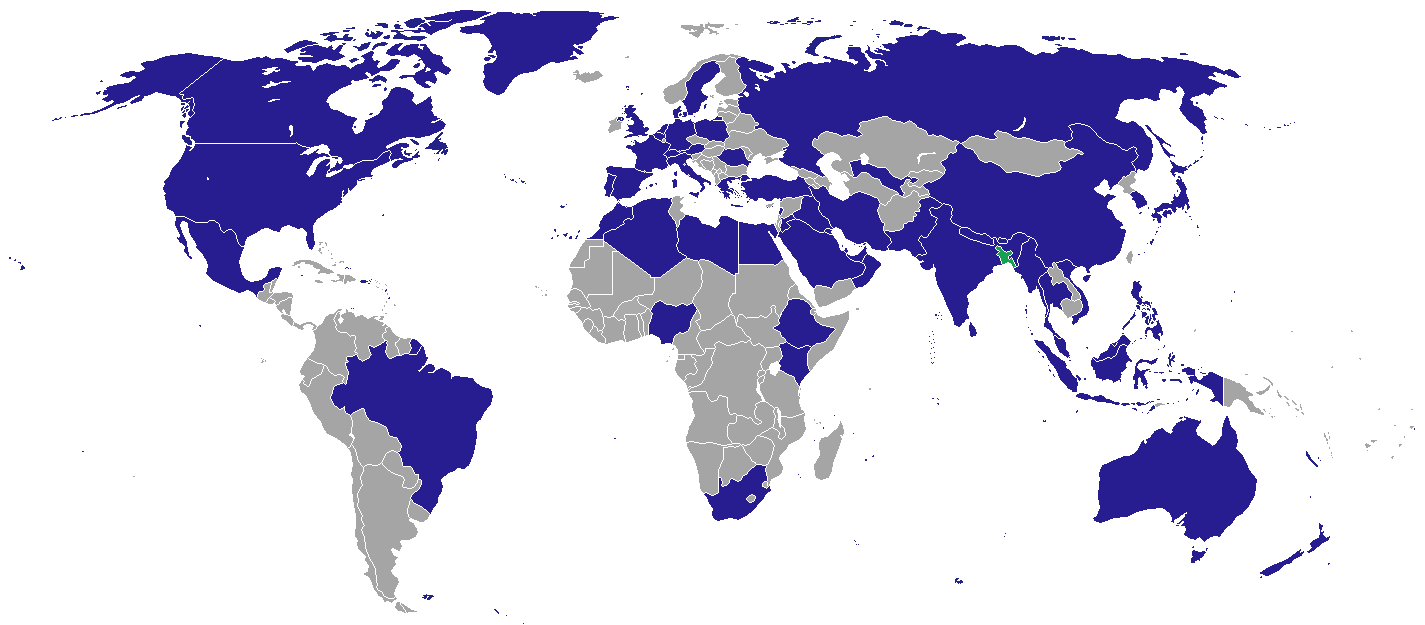
Map of countries and territories with current diplomatic missions of Bangladesh People's Republic of Bangladesh Hosts a Bangladeshi embassy/high commission

Bangladesh has a growing number of diplomatic and consular missions around the world. As of 2026, Bangladesh has over 83 missions around the world, of which 60 are embassies or high commissions; 20 are consular missions; and two permanent missions to the United Nations in New York City and Geneva.

Notably, Bangladesh is one of only three countries that maintain a resident embassy in the isolationist South Asian country of Bhutan.

As a member of the Commonwealth of Nations, Bangladeshi diplomatic missions in the capital cities of fellow Commonwealth countries are known as "High Commissions" instead of Embassies. In some cities of Commonwealth countries, Bangladeshi consular missions are called "Assistant High Commissions" or "Deputy High Commissions".

== History ==
The first diplomatic mission of the future state of Bangladesh was founded in Kolkata on 18 April 1971 after M Hossain Ali, the deputy high commissioner of Pakistan, and the other ethnic Bengali staff at the mission defected to the Bangladeshi provisional government amidst a spate of similar defections around the world during the Bangladesh Liberation War. Although it was not officially recognized by India at the time, it was allowed to function under Bangladeshi control. Another mission in New Delhi was opened ten days later with the knowledge of the Indian Ministry of External Affairs. Later that year, offices similar to trade missions were opened in countries such as the Soviet Union, Czechoslovakia, and Romania to represent Bangladesh until the country gained diplomatic recognition.

In recent years, the government had decided to expand the country's diplomatic network to increase international trade and better serve Bangladeshis abroad, with plans to open over twenty new missions by the end of 2021 and add over thirty diplomatic missions by 2024.

== Current missions ==
=== Africa ===
Host country	Host city	Mission	Year opened	Concurrent accreditation	Ref(s)
Algeria	Algiers	Embassy	1973 (Note: Closed from 1993 to 2016.)	Countries: Cameroon; Gabon; Mali; Mauritania	
Egypt	Cairo	Embassy	1973	Countries: Congo-Kinshasa; Eritrea	
Ethiopia	Addis Ababa	Embassy	2016	Countries: Burundi; South Sudan; Sudan; International organizations: African Union (Note: Accredited as an observer mission.); United Nations Economic Commission for Africa	
Kenya	Nairobi	High Commission	1978	Countries: Rwanda; Somalia; Tanzania; Uganda; International organizations: United Nations; United Nations Environment Programme; United Nations Human Settlements Programme	
Libya	Tripoli	Embassy	1975	Countries: Burkina Faso; Tunisia	
Mauritius	Port Louis	High Commission	2012	Countries: Comoros; Madagascar; Seychelles	
Morocco	Rabat	Embassy	1990		
Nigeria	Abuja	High Commission	2016	Countries: Angola; Congo-Brazzaville; Gambia; Liberia	
Sierra Leone	Freetown	High Commission	2026		
South Africa	Pretoria	High Commission	1995	Countries: Botswana; Mozambique; Namibia; Zambia; Zimbabwe	

=== Americas ===
Host country	Host city	Mission	Year opened	Concurrent accreditation	Ref(s)
Brazil	Brasília	Embassy	2012	Countries: Chile; Paraguay; Uruguay	
Canada	Ottawa	High Commission	1972	Countries: Bahamas; Cuba; Nicaragua; Trinidad and Tobago; International organizations: International Civil Aviation Organization	
Canada	Toronto	Consulate-General	2018	Countries: Bahamas; Cuba; Nicaragua; Trinidad and Tobago; International organizations: International Civil Aviation Organization	
Mexico	Mexico City	Embassy	2012	Countries: Costa Rica; Ecuador; Guatemala; Honduras	
United States	Washington, D.C.	Embassy	1972	Countries: Belize; Colombia; Dominican Republic; Guyana; Haiti; International organizations: Organization of American States	
United States	Los Angeles	Consulate-General	1994	Countries: Belize; Colombia; Dominican Republic; Guyana; Haiti; International organizations: Organization of American States	
United States	Miami	Consulate-General	2021	Countries: Belize; Colombia; Dominican Republic; Guyana; Haiti; International organizations: Organization of American States	
United States	New York City	Consulate-General	1990	Countries: Belize; Colombia; Dominican Republic; Guyana; Haiti; International organizations: Organization of American States	

=== Asia ===
Host country	Host city	Mission	Year opened	Concurrent accreditation	Ref(s)
Bahrain	Manama	Embassy	1983		
Bhutan	Thimphu	Embassy	1980		
Brunei	Bandar Seri Begawan	High Commission	1985 (Note: Closed between 1988 and 1997.)		
China	Beijing	Embassy	1976		
China	Hong Kong	Consulate-General	1976		
China	Kunming	Consulate-General	2013		
India	New Delhi	High Commission	1972		
India	Chennai	Deputy High Commission	2021		
India	Kolkata	Deputy High Commission	1971		
India	Mumbai	Deputy High Commission	2013		
India	Agartala	Assistant High Commission	2015 (Note: Originally opened as a visa office in 1974.)		
India	Guwahati	Assistant High Commission	2017		
Indonesia	Jakarta	Embassy	1972		
Iran	Tehran	Embassy	1974	Countries: Armenia	
Iraq	Baghdad	Embassy	1973 (Note: Reopened in 2010.)		
Japan	Tokyo	Embassy	1972		
Jordan	Amman	Embassy	1998	Countries: Palestine; Syria	
Kuwait	Kuwait City	Embassy	1974		
Lebanon	Beirut	Embassy	2013	Countries: Cyprus	
Malaysia	Kuala Lumpur	High Commission	1972		
Maldives	Malé	High Commission	1998		
Myanmar	Yangon	Embassy	1972		
Nepal	Kathmandu	Embassy	1971		
Oman	Muscat	Embassy	1983		
Pakistan	Islamabad	High Commission	1976		
Pakistan	Karachi	Deputy High Commission	1976		
Philippines	Manila	Embassy	1981	Countries: Palau	
Qatar	Doha	Embassy	1975		
Saudi Arabia	Riyadh (Note: Moved from Jeddah)	Embassy	1976	Countries: Djibouti	
Saudi Arabia	Jeddah	Consulate-General	1985	Countries: Djibouti	
Singapore	Singapore	High Commission	1983 (Note: Started as trade mission in 1972; upgraded into a high commission in 1983.)		
South Korea	Seoul	Embassy	1987		
Sri Lanka	Colombo	High Commission	1976		
Thailand	Bangkok	Embassy	1975	Countries: Cambodia; International organizations: UNESCAP	
Turkey	Ankara	Embassy	1977	Countries: Azerbaijan; Georgia; Turkmenistan	
Turkey	Istanbul	Consulate-General	2012	Countries: Azerbaijan; Georgia; Turkmenistan	
United Arab Emirates	Abu Dhabi	Embassy	1974		
United Arab Emirates	Dubai	Consulate-General	1980		
Uzbekistan	Tashkent	Embassy	1996	Countries: Afghanistan; Kyrgyzstan; Tajikistan	
Vietnam	Hanoi	Embassy	1993	Countries: Laos	

=== Europe ===
Host country	Host city	Mission	Year opened	Concurrent accreditation	Ref(s)
Austria	Vienna	Embassy	2014	Countries: Hungary; Slovakia; Slovenia	
Belgium	Brussels	Embassy	1973	Countries: Luxembourg; Multilateral organizations: European Union	
Denmark	Copenhagen	Embassy	2015	Countries: Estonia; Iceland	
France	Paris	Embassy	1972	Countries: Ivory Coast; Multilateral organizations: UNESCO	
Germany	Berlin	Embassy	1972	Countries: Czechia; Kosovo	
Greece	Athens	Embassy	2009	Countries: Albania; Malta	
Ireland	Dublin	Embassy	2026		
Italy	Rome	Embassy	1973	Countries: Montenegro; Serbia; Multilateral organizations: Food and Agriculture Organization; International Fund for Agricultural Development; World Food Programme	
Italy	Milan	Consulate-General	2011	Countries: Montenegro; Serbia; Multilateral organizations: Food and Agriculture Organization; International Fund for Agricultural Development; World Food Programme	
Netherlands	The Hague	Embassy	1995	Countries: Bosnia and Herzegovina; Croatia; International organizations: Organisation for the Prohibition of Chemical Weapons	
Poland	Warsaw	Embassy	1972 (Note: Closed from 2002 to 2015.)	Countries: Latvia; Lithuania; Ukraine	
Portugal	Lisbon	Embassy	2012	Countries: Guinea-Bissau	
Romania	Bucharest	Embassy	1975 (Note: Closed from 1995 to 2020.)	Countries: Bulgaria; Moldova; North Macedonia	
Russia	Moscow	Embassy	1972	Countries: Belarus; Kazakhstan	
Spain	Madrid	Embassy	1996		
Sweden	Stockholm	Embassy	1972	Countries: Finland; Norway	
United Kingdom	London	High Commission	1972	Multilateral organizations: International Maritime Organization	
United Kingdom	Birmingham	Assistant High Commission	1974	Multilateral organizations: International Maritime Organization	
United Kingdom	Manchester	Assistant High Commission	1973	Multilateral organizations: International Maritime Organization	

=== Oceania ===
Host country	Host city	Mission	Year opened	Concurrent accreditation	Ref(s)
Australia	Canberra	High Commission	1972	Countries: Fiji	
Australia	Sydney	Consulate-General	2018	Countries: Fiji	
New Zealand	Wellington	Embassy	2026		

=== Multilateral organisations ===
Organization	Host country	Host city	Mission	Year opened	Concurrent accreditation	Ref(s)
Organisation of Islamic Cooperation	Saudi Arabia	Jeddah	Permanent Mission			
United Nations	United States	New York City	Permanent Mission	1972	Countries: Panama; Peru	
United Nations	Switzerland	Geneva	Permanent Mission	1972	Countries: Switzerland; Holy See	

== Gallery ==
Bangladeshi Embassies and High Commissions

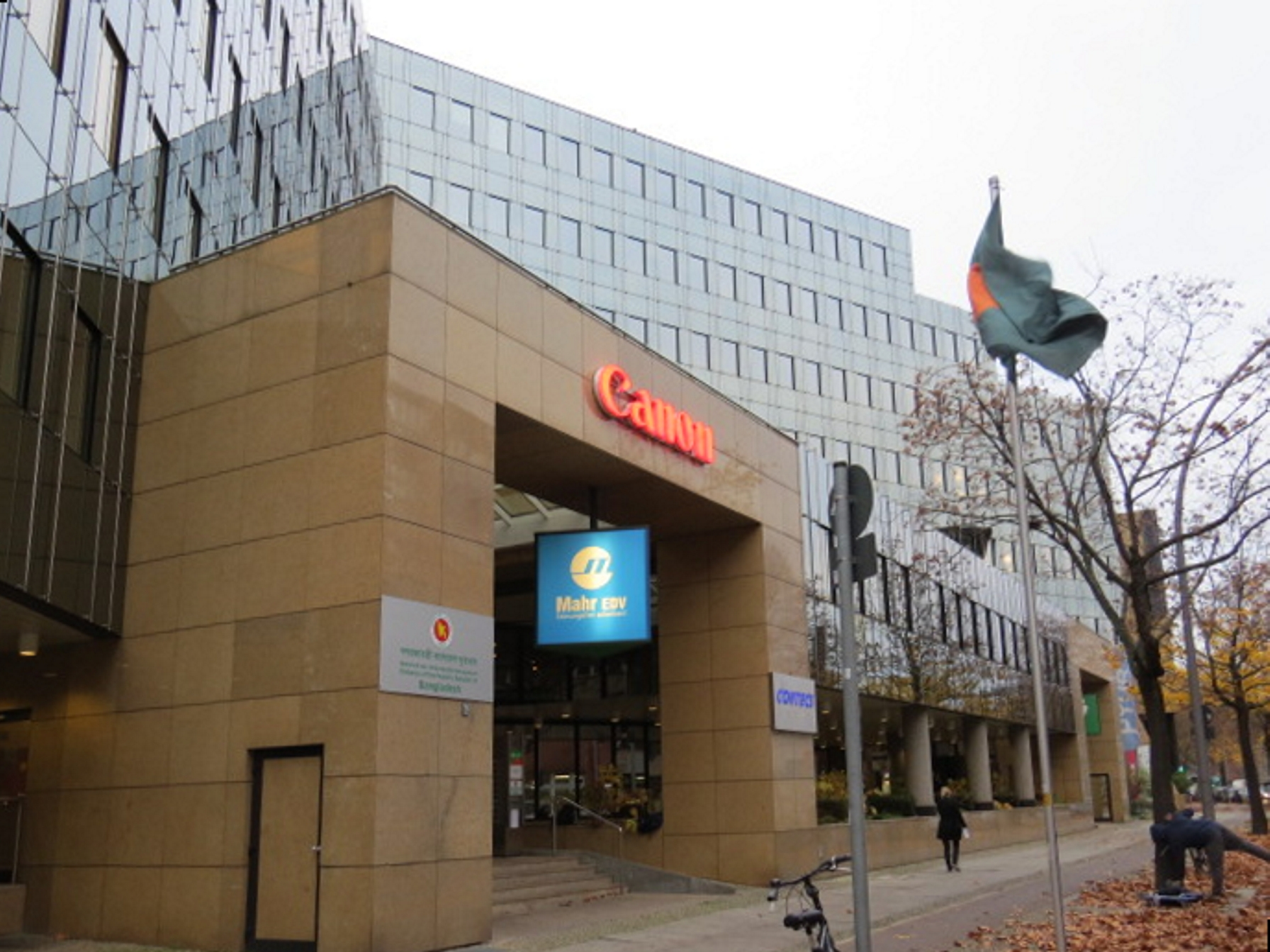
Embassy in Berlin

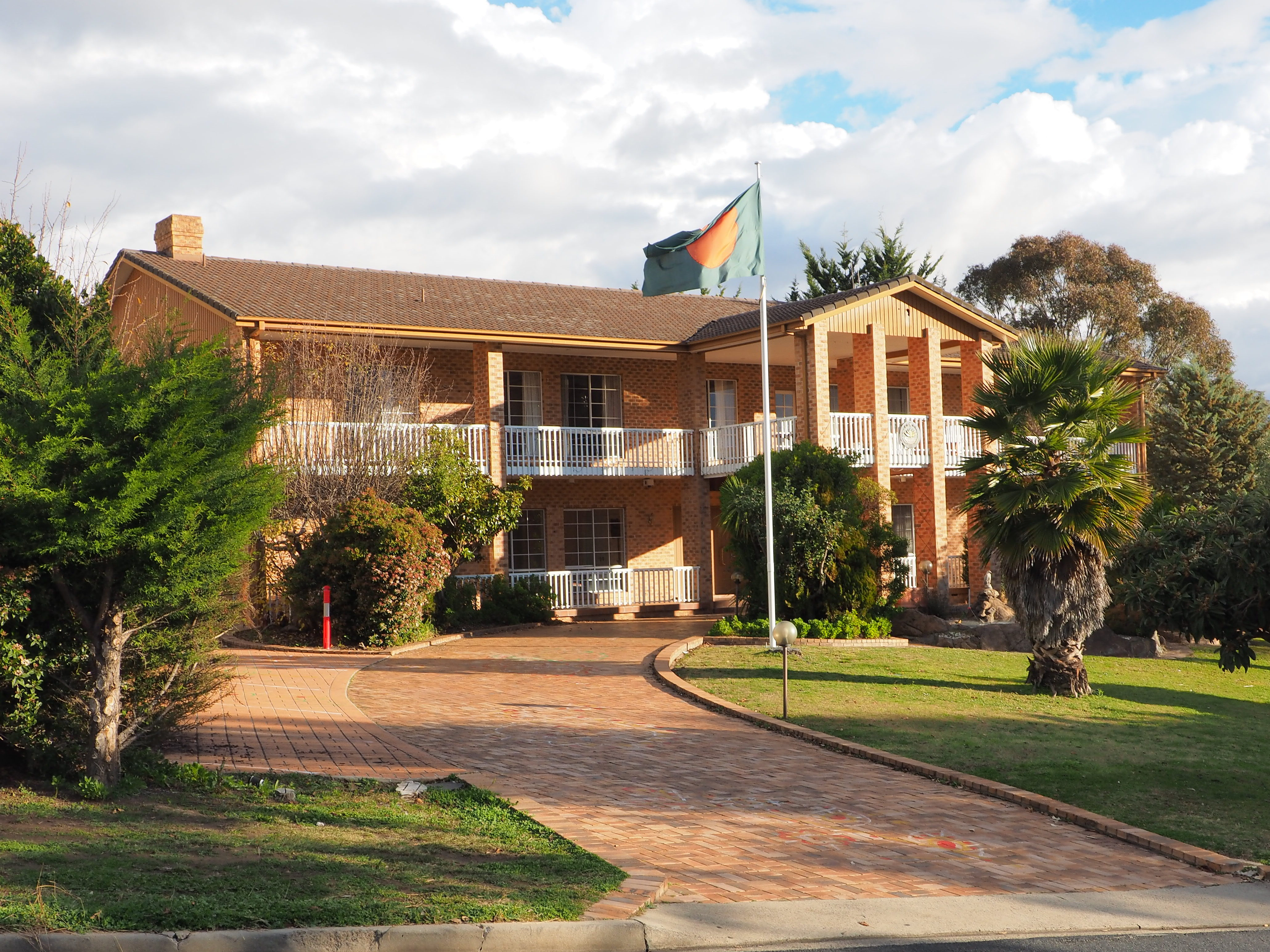
High Commission in Canberra

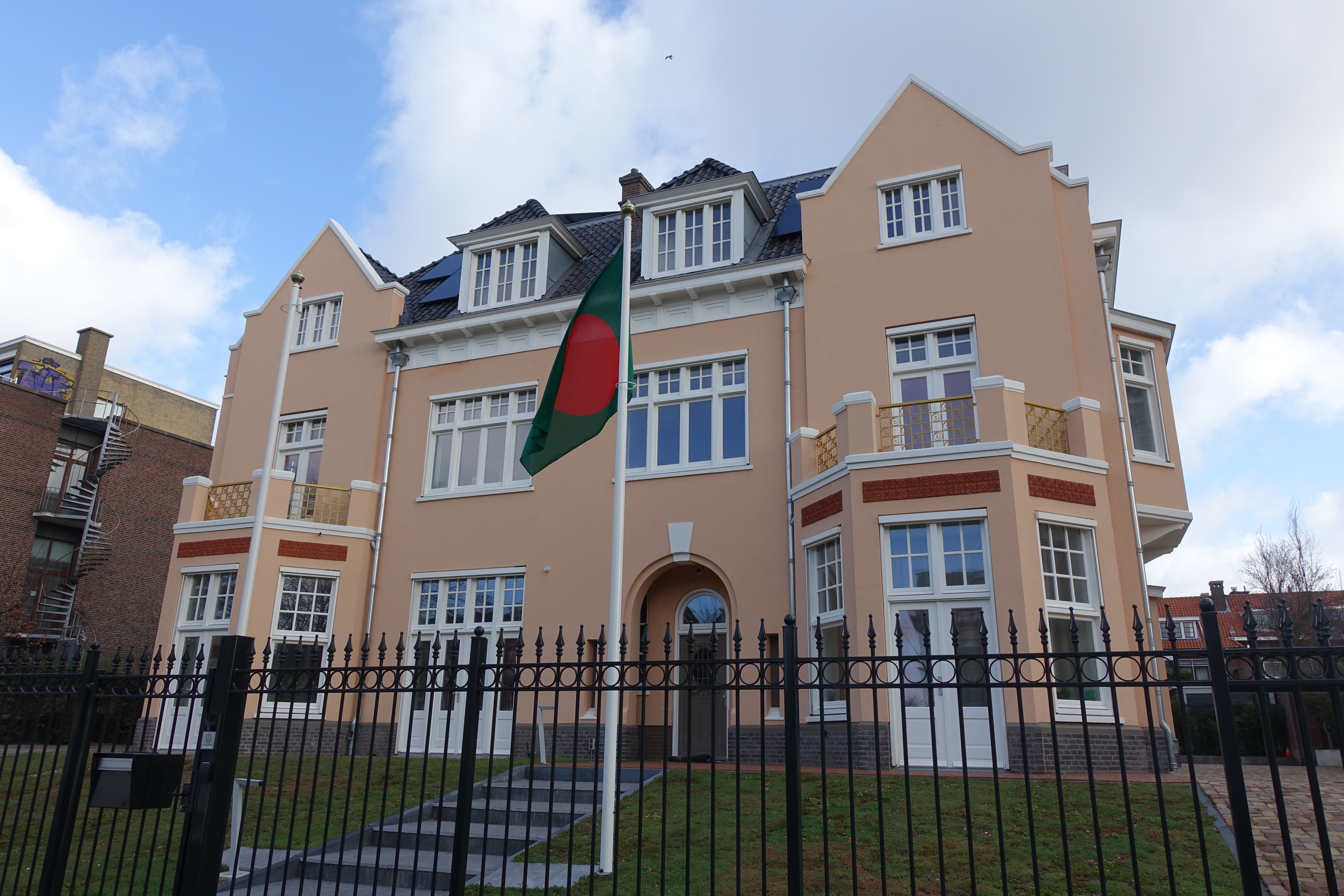
Embassy in The Hague

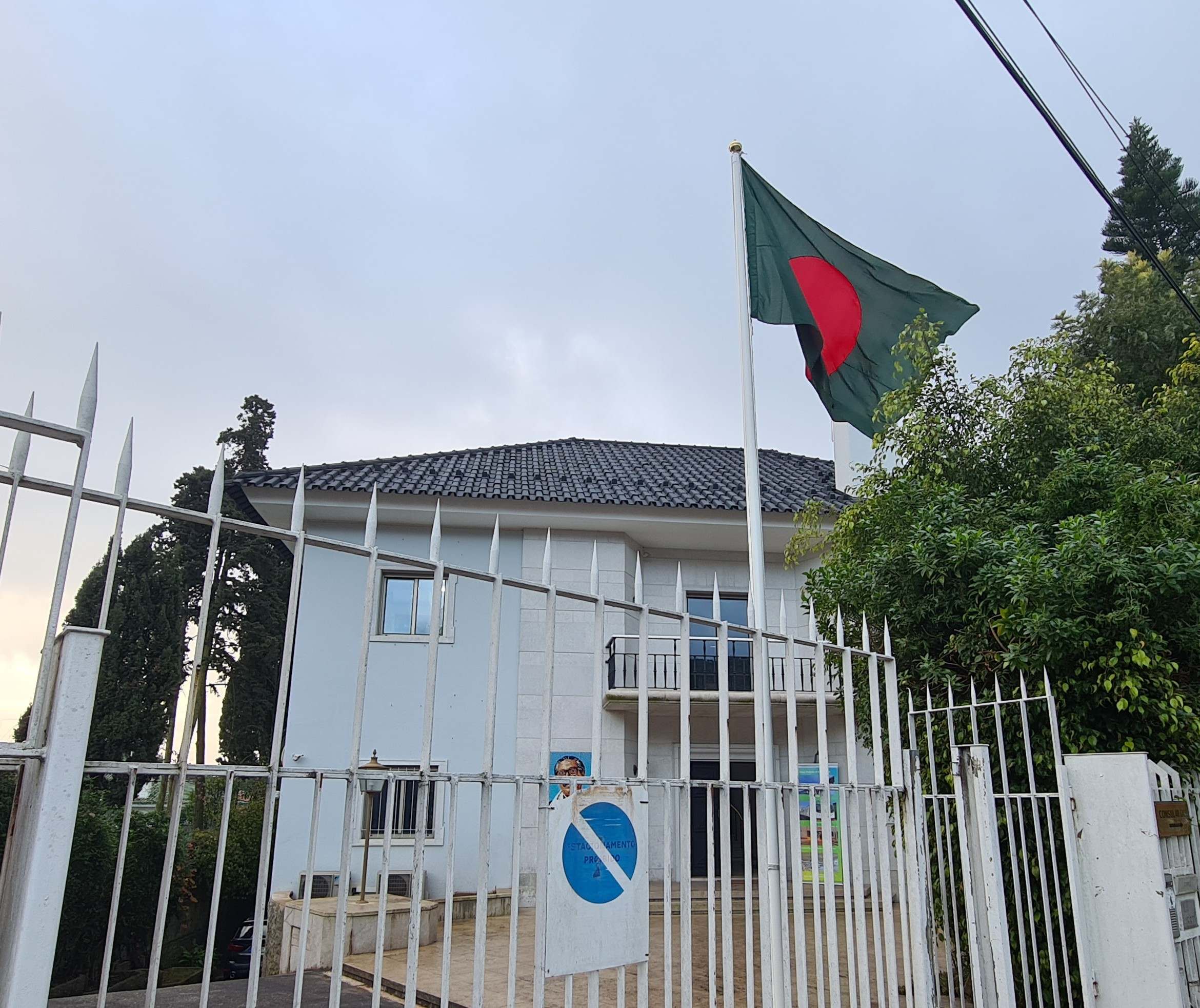
Embassy in Lisbon

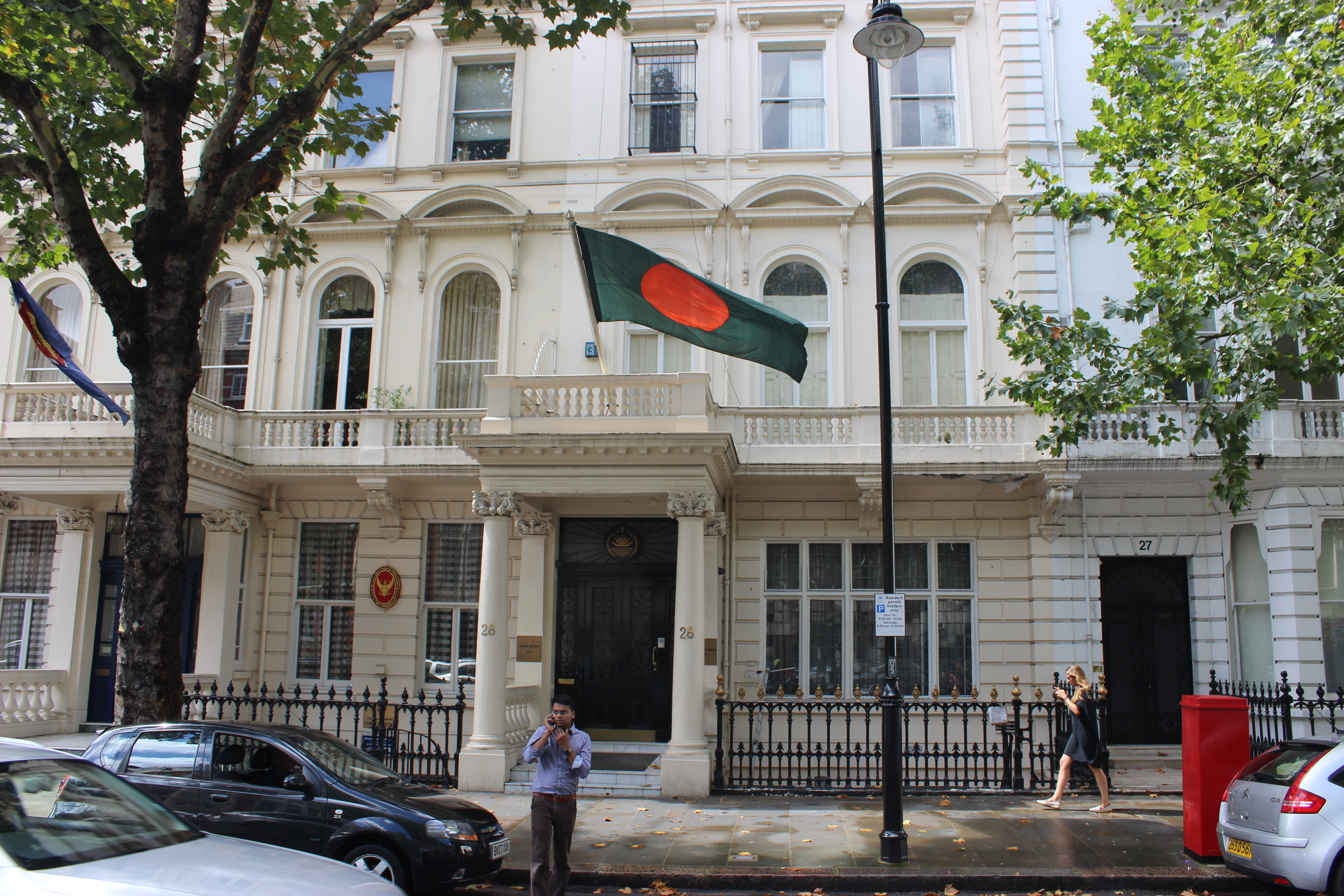
High Commission in London

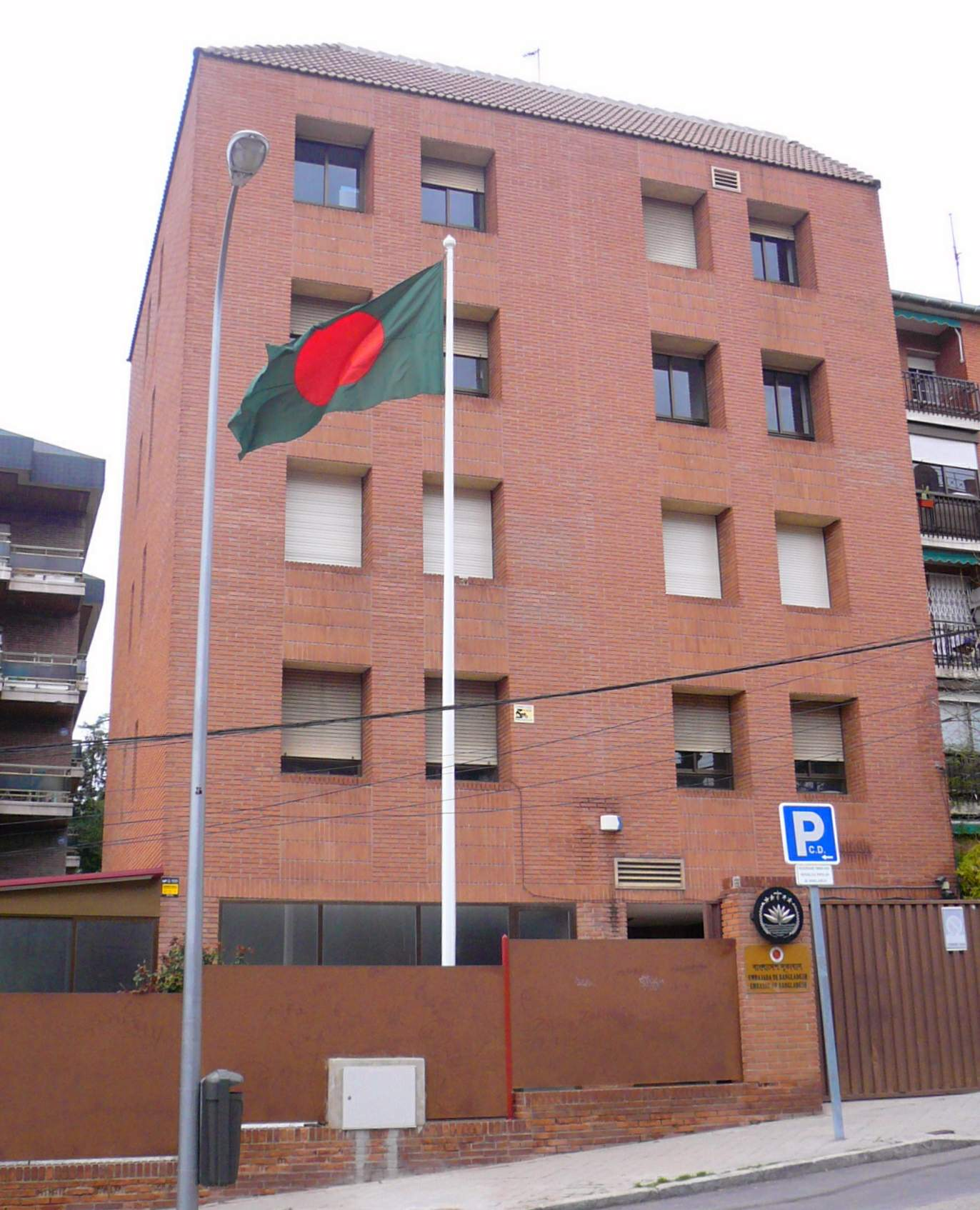
Embassy in Madrid

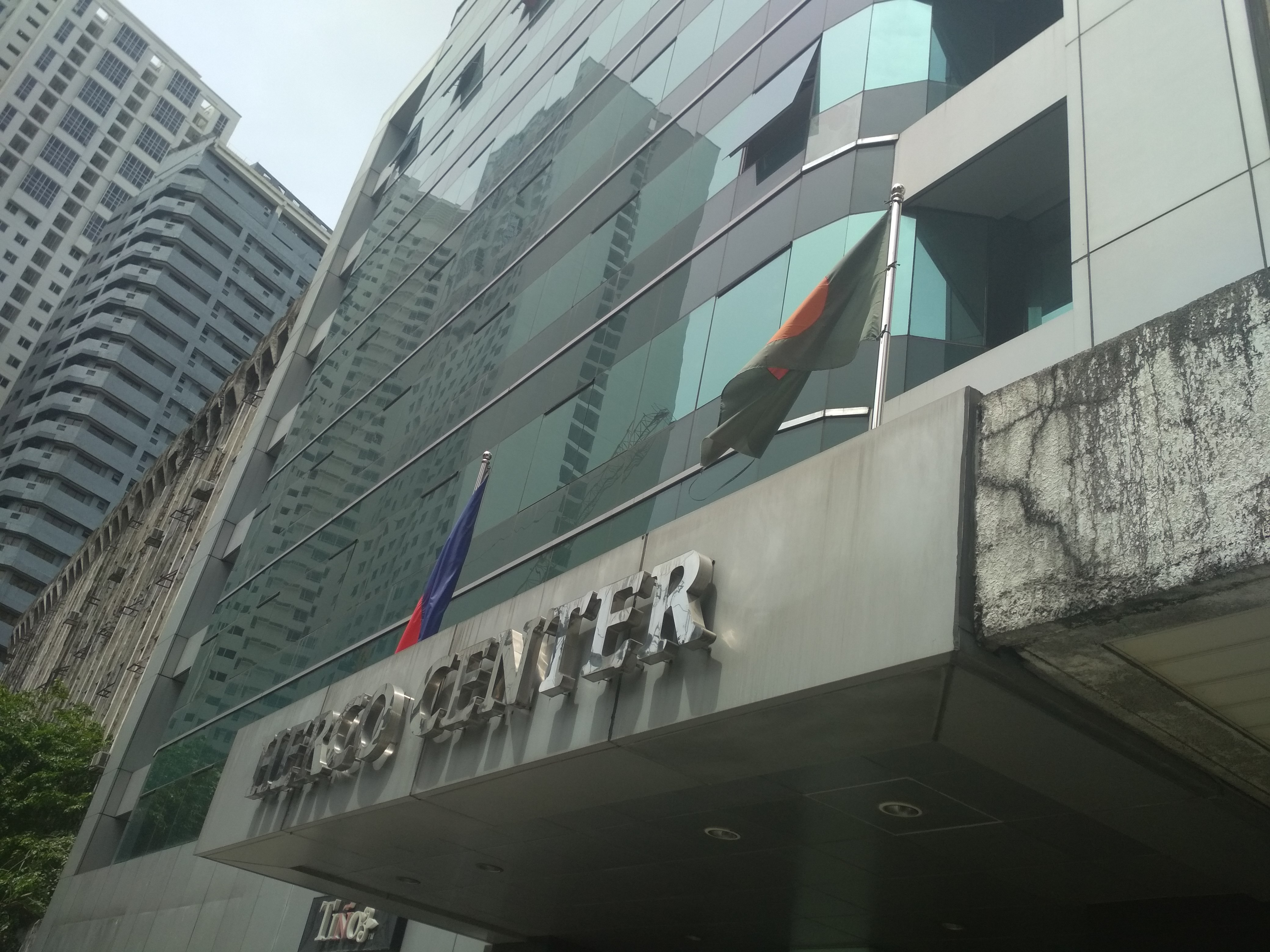
Building hosting the embassy in Manila

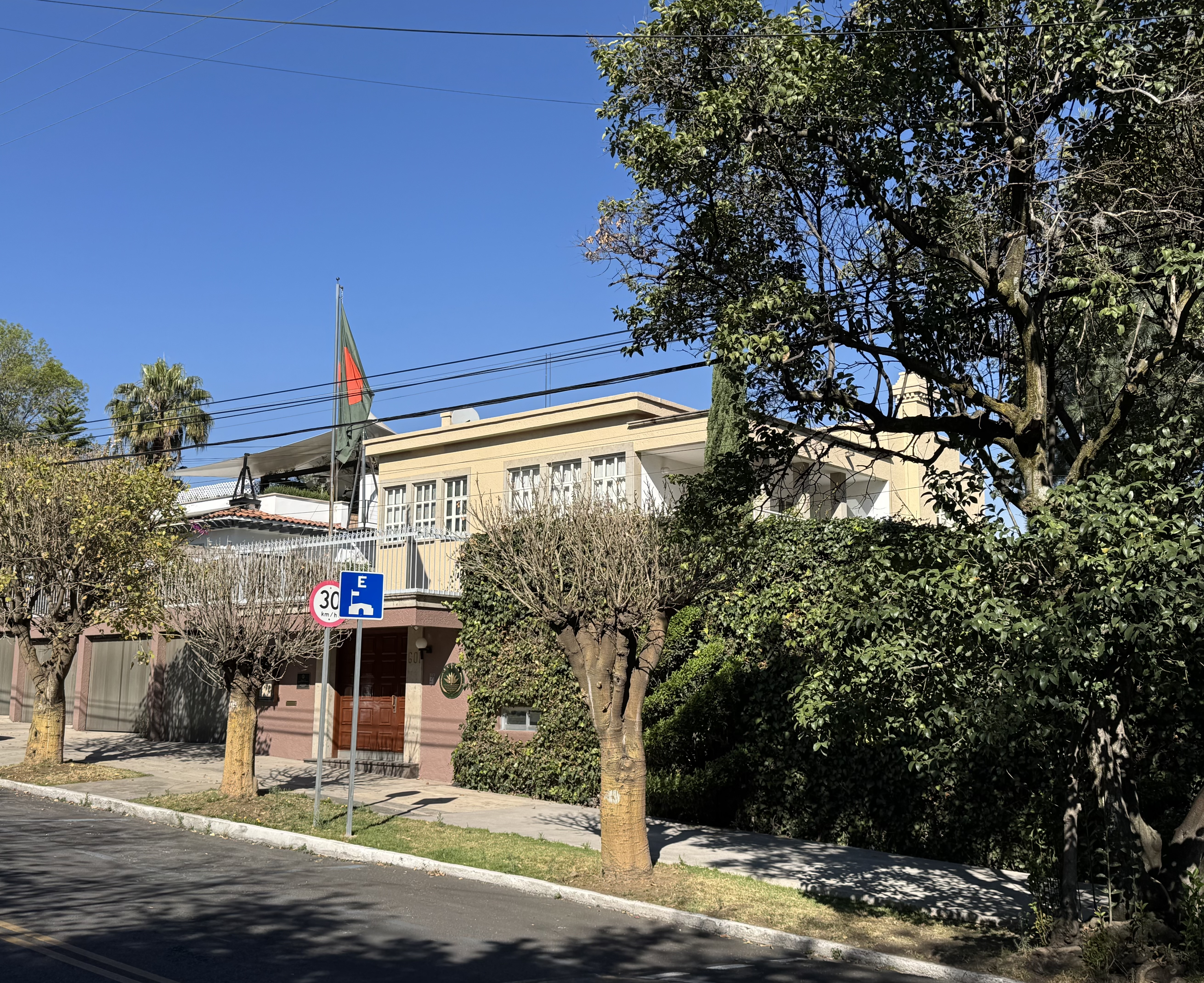
Embassy in Mexico City

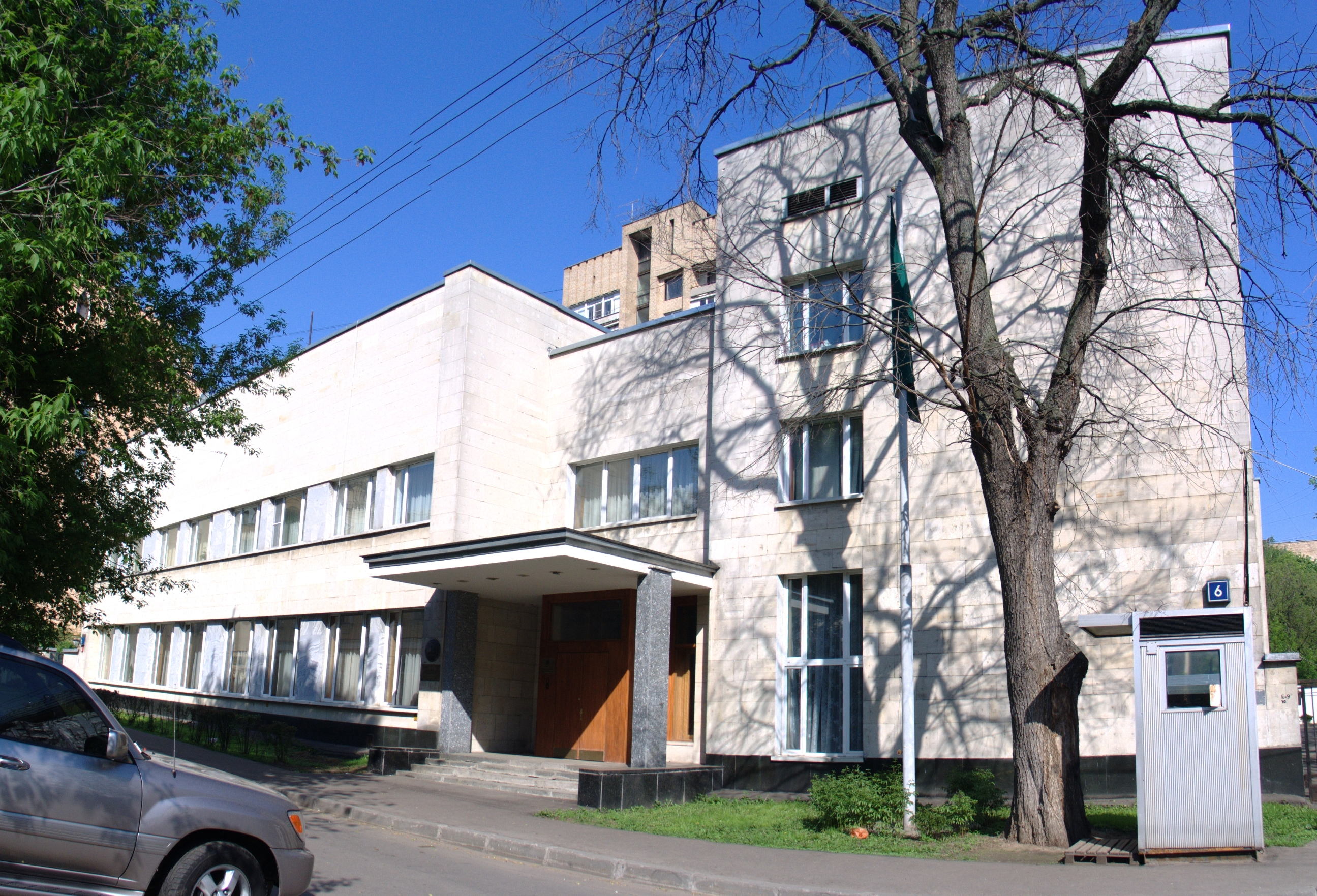
Embassy in Moscow

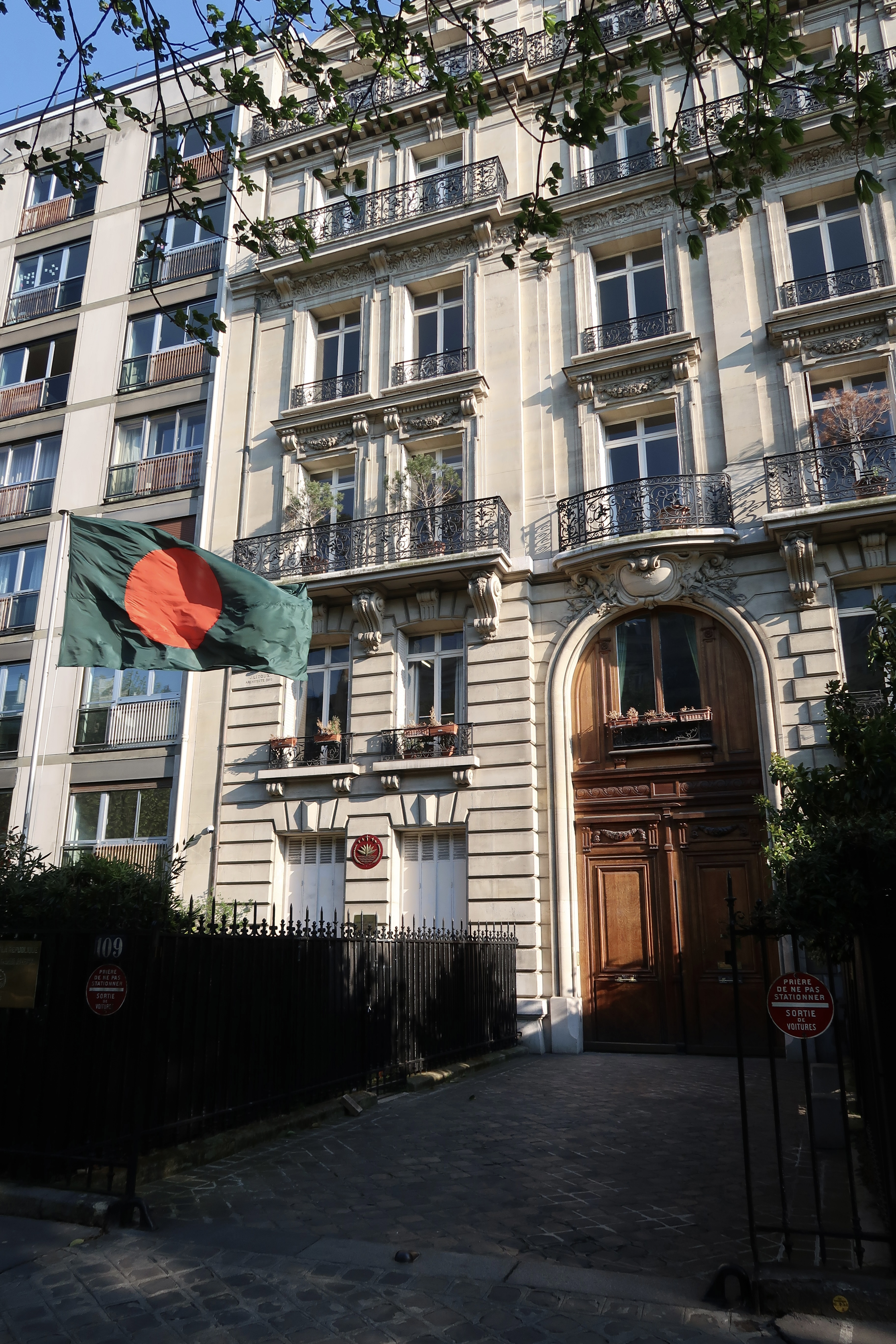
Embassy in Paris

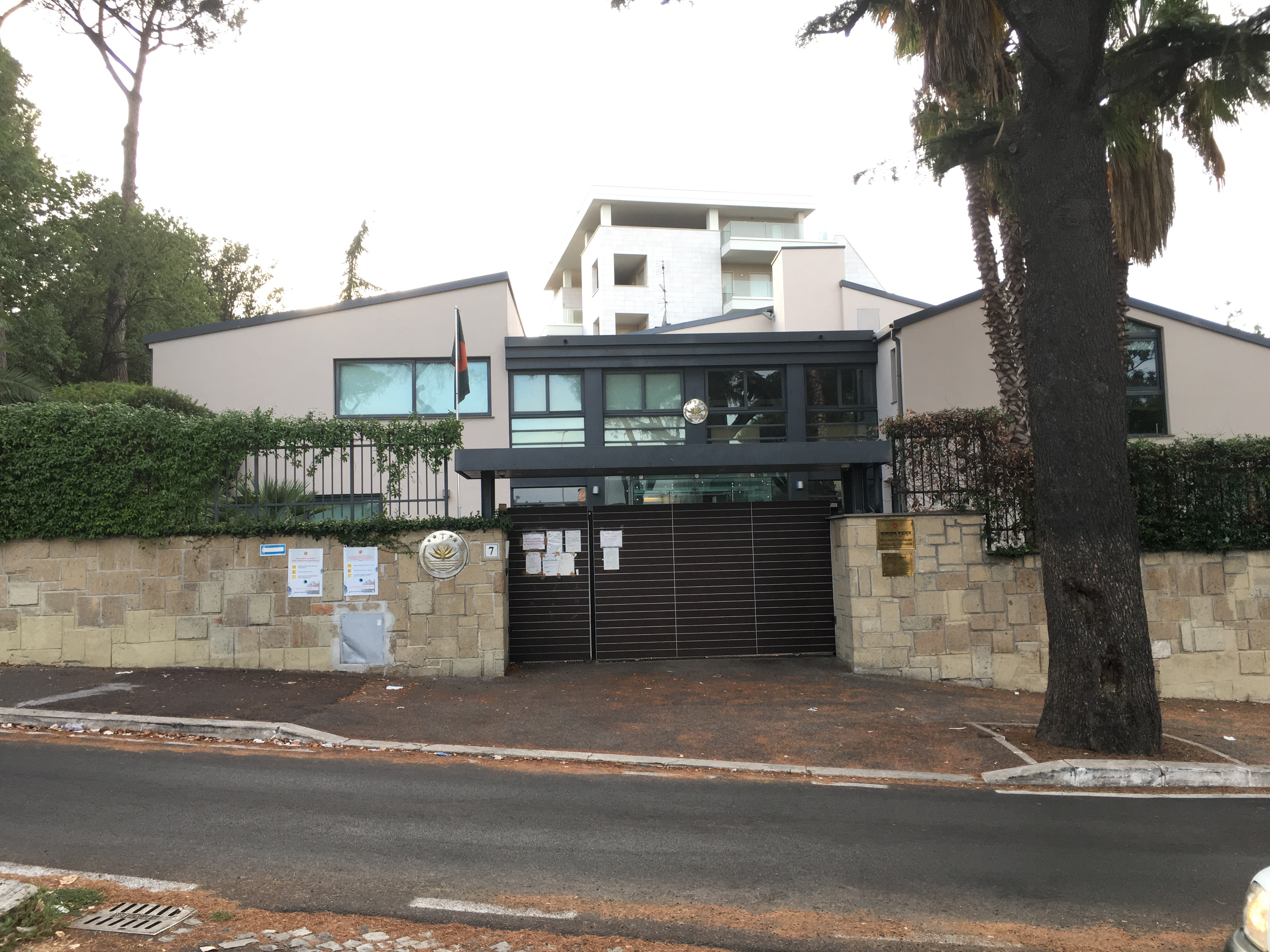
Embassy in Rome

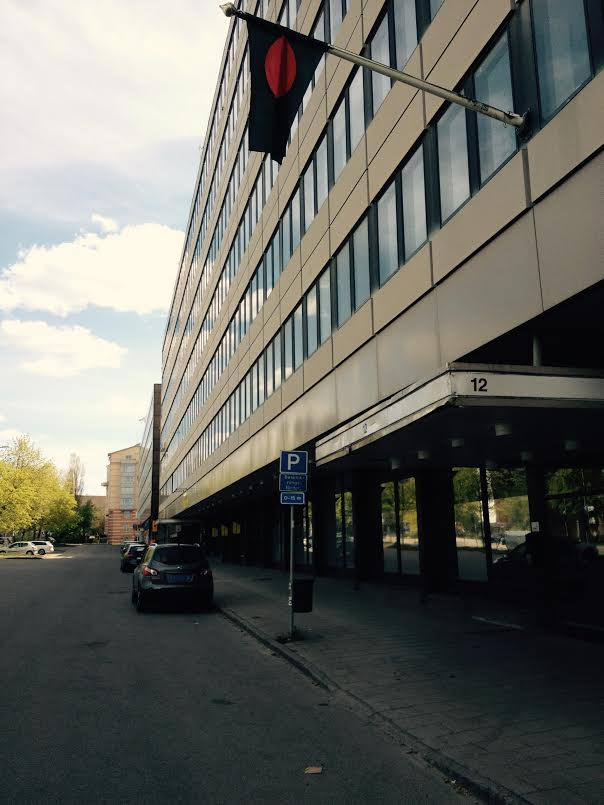
Embassy in Stockholm

Embassy in Tokyo

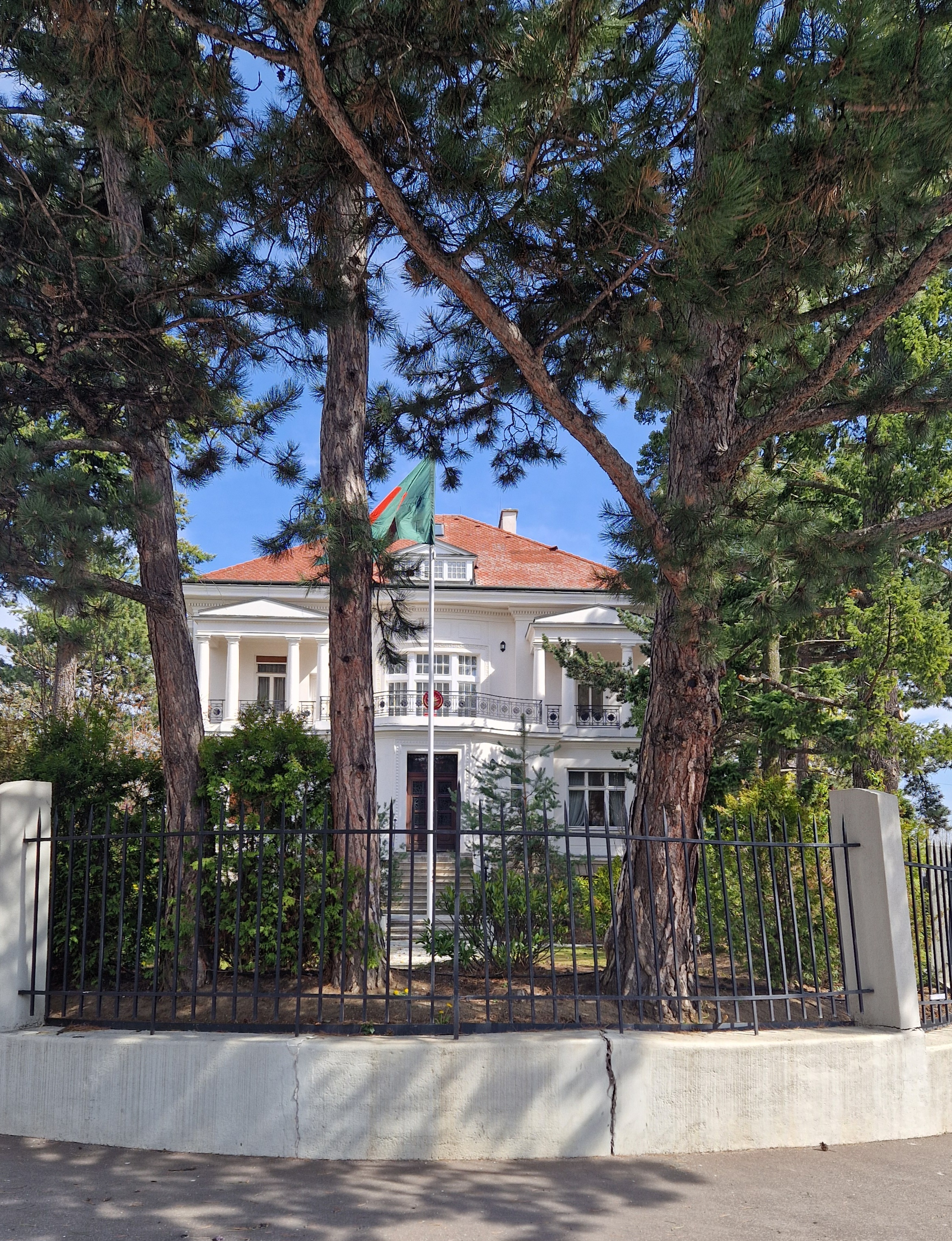
Embassy in Vienna

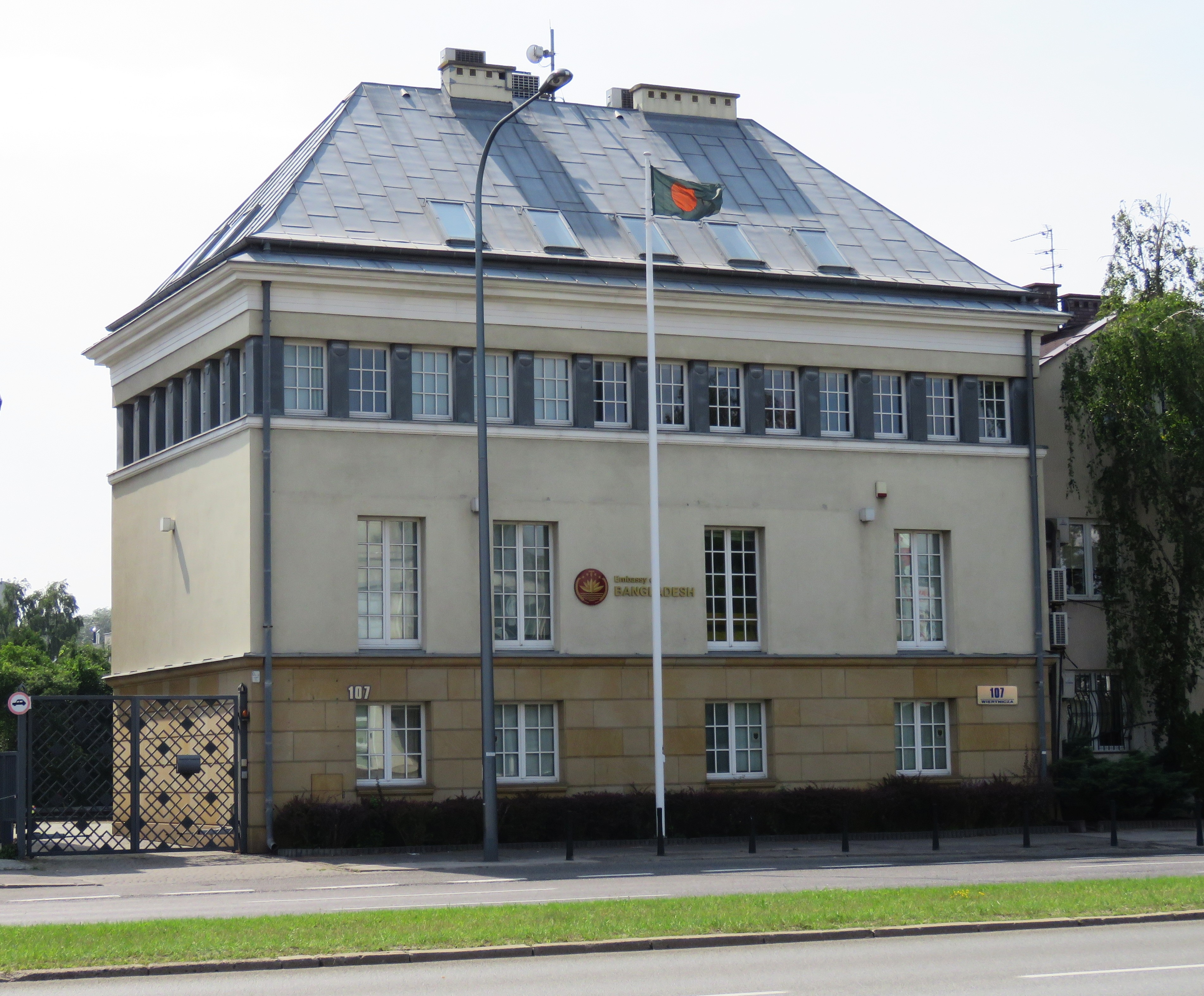
Embassy in Warsaw

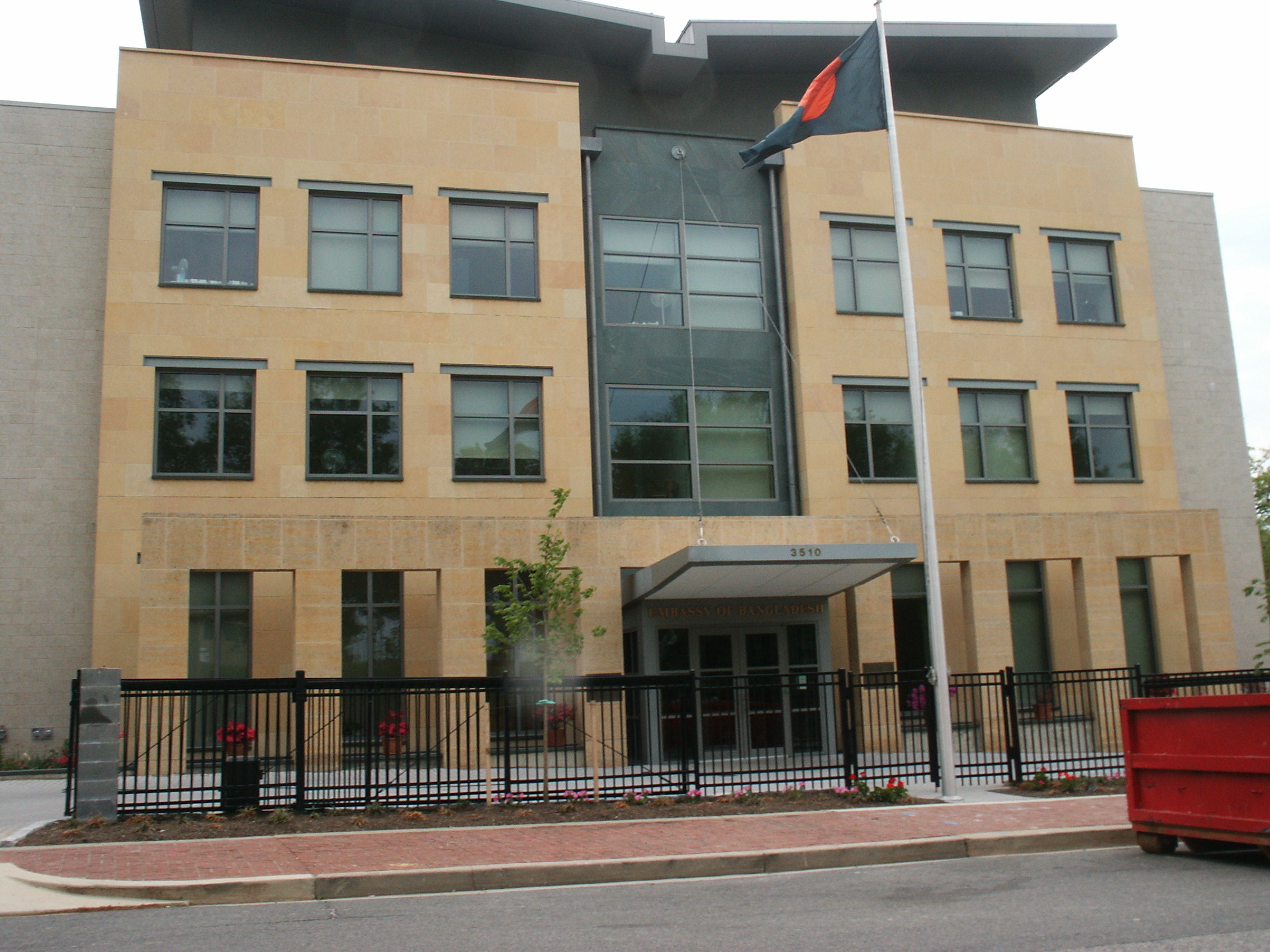
Embassy in Washington, D.C.

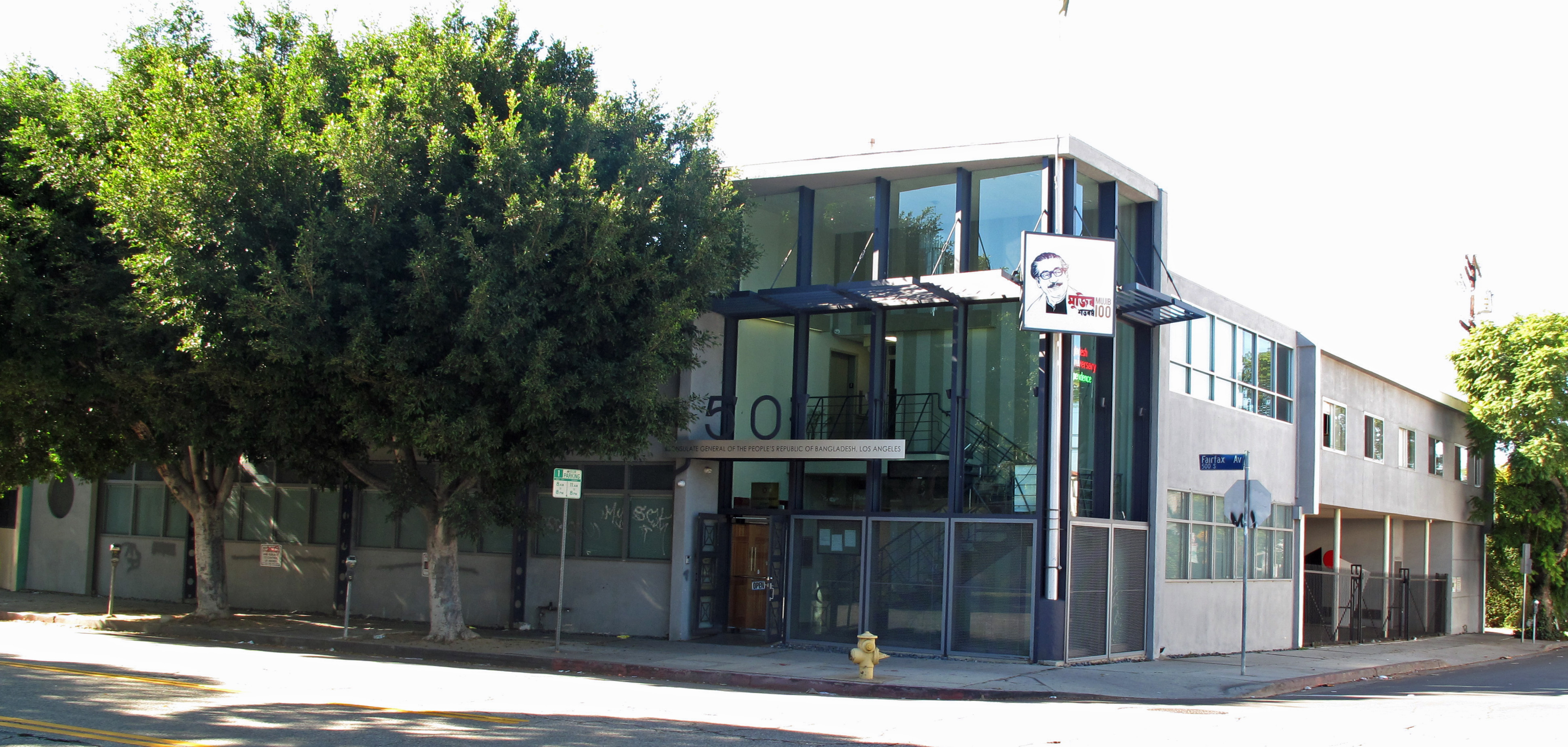
Consulate-General in Los Angeles

== Missions to open ==
Host country	Host city	Mission	Ref.
Argentina	Buenos Aires	Embassy	
Brazil	São Paulo	Consulate-General	
Germany	Frankfurt	Consulate-General	
Guyana	Georgetown	High Commission	
Norway	Oslo	Embassy	
Switzerland	Bern	Embassy	
United States	Detroit	Consulate-General	
Zimbabwe	Harare	Embassy	

== Closed missions ==
=== Africa ===
Host country	Host city	Mission	Year opened	Year closed	Ref.
Senegal	Dakar	Embassy	1973	Unknown	
Sudan	Khartoum	Embassy	2021	2023	

=== Asia ===
Host country	Host city	Mission	Year opened	Year closed	Ref.
Myanmar	Sittwe	Consulate	1972	2024	

=== Europe ===
Host country	Host city	Mission	Year opened	Year closed	Ref.
Yugoslavia	Belgrade	Embassy	1972	1992	

== See also ==
- Foreign relations of Bangladesh
- List of diplomatic missions in Bangladesh
- Visa policy of Bangladesh
- Ambassadors of Bangladesh
