= F-Minor (band) =

F-Minor এফ মাইনর
- Origin: Dhaka, Bangladesh
- Genres: Folk rock, Acoustic rock
- Years active: 2016–present
- Members: Pinky Chiran; Nadia Ritchil; Gloria Manda; Diba Chicham; Akiu Marma
- Past members: Oishorjo Chakma

F-Minor (Bengali: এফ মাইনর) is an all-female band from Bangladesh, formed in Dhaka on October 28, 2016. It is Bangladesh's first all-female band from ethnic minority communities. The group preserves and promotes the traditional music of Bangladesh's ethnic minority using modern instruments. They perform original and folk songs in Bengali and several other languages, including Garo, Marma, Hajong, and Tripura.

== History ==
=== Formative Years (2016–2018) ===
On 28 October 2016, F-Minor was officially formed in Dhaka. The concept for the band originated during a gathering in the Farmgate area involving musician Jadu Ritchil and Antar Sku, a guitarist for the band Madol. The band was established to preserve the folk music and heritage of Bangladesh's ethnic minority communities, and present these ethnic songs using modern musical instruments. The group initially debuted as a trio consisting of vocalists and guitarists Pinky Chiran, Nadia Ritchil, and Oishorjo Chakma

The band's name is derived from the F minor guitar chord. The letter "F" stands for "Female," "Freedom," "Fighter," and "Five," while the word "Minor" represents the members' minority ethnic communities. The F minor chord was selected over the F major chord because the members stated its tone reflected the history, realities, and struggles of ethnic minority communities in Bangladesh.

The band faced financial challenges during its early years. The band lacked the funds to purchase musical equipment. They initially relied on two acoustic guitars gifted by founder Jadu Ritchil and lyricist Babul D. Nokrek. In late 2016, they made their debut stage performance at the Garo Wangala Festival in Banani, Dhaka. The band eventually financed their first professional electric guitars and drum sets using earnings from live performances.

In 2018, founding member Oishorjo Chakma left the group after relocating outside Dhaka. The lineup was subsequently expanded to a five-member group, with the addition of Akiu Marma on keyboards, Diba Chicham on cajon and drums, and Gloria Manda on lead guitar. Following these changes, the lineup consisted of four members from the Garo community (Pinky Chiran, Nadia Ritchil, Gloria Manda, and Diba Chicham) and one member from the Marma community (Akiu Marma).

=== Mainstream breakthrough and Activism (2019–present) ===
In 2019, The band gained wider recognition following the release of their original track "Jongla Phool", which received widespread circulation on social media platforms. On 9 November 2019, They performed on the Nazrul stage at the Dhaka Lit Fest held at the Bangla Academy premises. The band performed multiple songs, including a folk Garo song, a Hajong song, a tune from the tea garden labour community, and their original track "Jongla Phool".

In January 2020, The band partnered with Plan International Bangladesh to release "Rukhey Darai Nirbhoy", a track addressing violence against women. The band joined the 2022 "Nodi Rocks" initiative, a project supported by the Swiss Embassy in Bangladesh and UNDP focused on climate change impacts on Bangladesh's rivers, for which they recorded and performed the track "Dahuk" at Jahangirnagar University. In August 2024, they performed at the "Joruri Shongjog" concert at Dhaka University, an event that raised over Tk 2.1 million and collected 20 truckloads of relief materials for flood-affected communities. In December 2024, the band produced the theme song "Banglar Meyera" for the Netherlands Embassy's "Mukho Kholo, Awaz Tolo" campaign against gender-based violence in Bangladesh.

In January 2025, F-Minor joined a cultural protest rally organized by the Indigenous Artists' Unity at Dhaka University. The demonstration opposed attacks on indigenous students and demanded that the term "Adivasi" (indigenous) be reinstated in national school textbooks for classes 9 and 10.

The band played at multiple public and state-sponsored events throughout 2025. In February 2025, they performed a multi-language fusion of "Ekusher Gaan" at the UNESCO Headquarters in Paris for the International Mother Language Day silver jubilee. In May 2025, the Kabi Nazrul Institute selected the band to perform at the "Nazrul Concert" on Manik Mia Avenue to launch a rock tribute album for National Poet Kazi Nazrul Islam. They appeared at the 'July Punarjagoran' concert at the Central Shaheed Minar and the Victory Day Concert at Suhrawardy Udyan in December 2025.

== Musical style ==
F-Minor fuses traditional ethnic folk music with modern rock and acoustic instrumentation, using electric guitars, keyboards, the cajon, and the ukulele. The band performs in the Bengali language as well as several other languages, including Garo, Marma, Hajong, and Tripura.

== Band members ==
=== Current members ===
Pinky Chiran – Lead vocals, acoustic guitar (2016–present)
Nadia Ritchil – Rhythm guitar, ukulele, backing vocals (2016–present)
Gloria Manda – Lead electric guitar (2018–present)
Akiu Marma – Keyboards (2018–present)
Diba Chicham – Cajon, drums, percussion (2018–present)

=== Past members ===
Oishorjo Chakma – Vocals, acoustic guitar (2016–2018).

== Discography ==
- Jongla Phool (2019)
- Poran Priyo (2019)
- Nachbe Pahar
- Somosto Din
- Rukhey Darai Nirbhoy (2020)
- Dahuk (2022)
- Meye Ami Somane Soman
- Banglar Meyera (2024)
- Turu Rutu Turu Ru

== Awards ==
Year	Award	Category	Result
2019	Anannya Top Ten Awards	Music	Won
2023	18th Sunsilk-Channel i Music Awards	Special Recognition	Won
