= Embassy of Bangladesh, Rome =

Diplomatic mission of Bangladesh

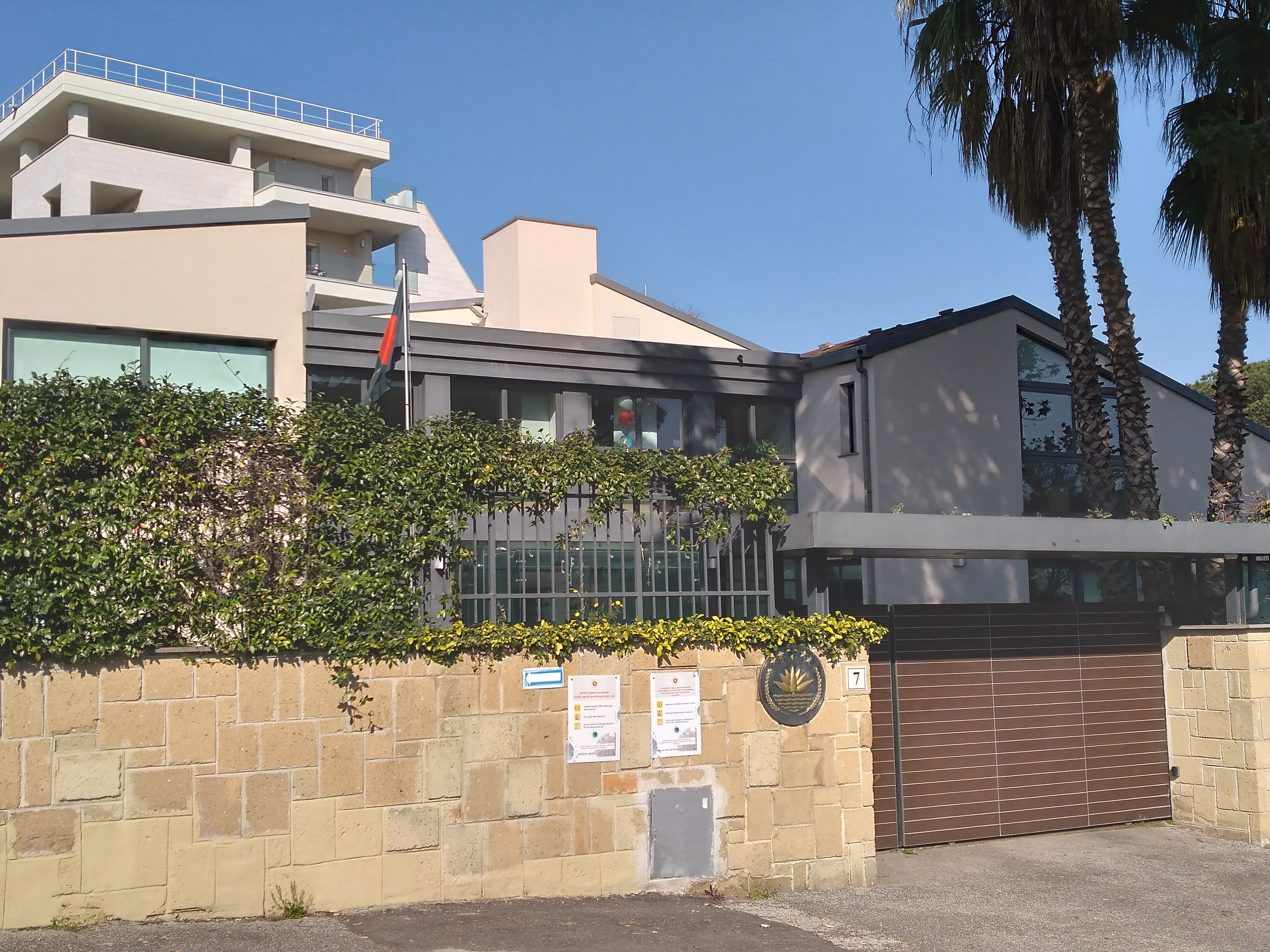
- Embassy of Bangladesh, Rome
- Location: Rome, Italy
- Address: Via dell'Antartide, 00144, EUR
- Coordinates: 41°49′31.22″N 12°27′51.15″E
- Opened: January 1973
- Ambassador: A. T. M. Rokebul Haque
- Website: Official website

The Embassy of Bangladesh, Rome is the diplomatic mission of Bangladesh to Italy. It is located at EUR, Rome, Italy. The embassy also operates Consulates-General in Milan, Venice and Naples. The ambassador is Md Shameem Ahsan, who is also the ambassador to Montenegro and Serbia.

== See also ==
- Bangladesh-Italy relations
- Bangladesh Diplomatic Missions
