= Mahbub Hassan Saleh =

- মাহবুব হাসান সালেহ
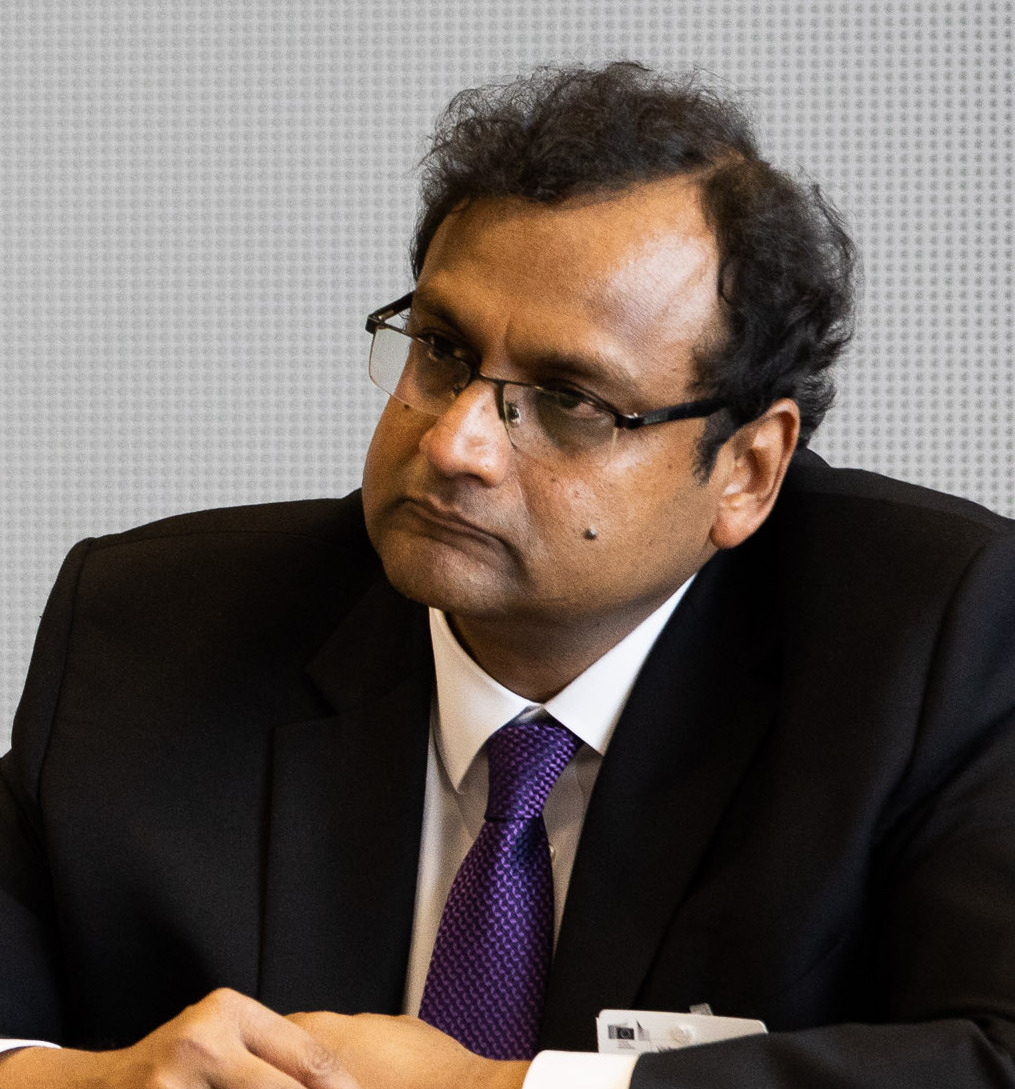
- Saleh in 2023

Ambassador of Bangladesh to Belgium
- In office 30 June 2020 – November 2024
- Succeeded by: Khandaker Masudul Alam

Personal details
- Education: Bangladesh University of Engineering and Technology; Monash University

Mahbub Hassan Saleh is a Bangladeshi diplomat and a former ambassador of Bangladesh to Belgium, Luxembourg, and the European Union.

== Early life ==
Saleh got his undergraduate degree from Bangladesh University of Engineering and Technology in civil engineering. He completed his Master's Diplomacy and Trade in Monash University.

== Career ==
Saleh joined the foreign service branch of the 16th Bangladesh Civil Service batch. He had served in the Bangladesh Embassies in South Korea and Australia.

Saleh was the acting high commissioner of Bangladesh in India in 2013. He was the deputy high commissioner of Bangladesh in India in 2014.

In August 2016, Saleh spoke at an event of the Potomac Institute for Policy Studies.

On 30 June 2020, Saleh was made the ambassador of Bangladesh to Belgium. He had been the deputy chief of mission to the Embassy of Bangladesh in the United States. He is also the ambassador of Bangladesh to the European Union. He had worked to move Bangladesh in the GSP Plus scheme of the European Union. In December 2022, he defended the human rights record of the government of Bangladesh at the Briefing on the Human Rights Situation in Bangladesh hosted by Fabio Massimo Castaldo. In April 2023, he met Fu Cong, Head of the Chinese Mission to the European Union and discussed Bangladesh–China relations.
