= Embassy of Bangladesh, Brussels =

Diplomatic mission of Bangladesh in Brussels, Belgium

- Address: Rue Jacques Jordaens 29, 1000 Brussels, Belgium
- Coordinates: 50°49′16″N 4°22′04″E
- Opened: 1973
- Ambassador: Khandaker Masudul Alam
- Jurisdiction: Belgium; Luxembourg; European Union
- Website: brussels.mofa.gov.bd

The Embassy of Bangladesh in Brussels is the diplomatic mission of Bangladesh to Belgium and Luxembourg. The embassy also served as Mission of Bangladesh to the European Union. It is headed by the ambassador of Bangladesh to Belgium.

== History ==
Bangladesh established diplomatic mission with Belgium in 1972. The following year, Bangladesh's first ambassador to Belgium, Sanaul Huq, was appointed on 15 May 1973 and served until 30 December 1976.
