= Bangladesh–Saudi Arabia relations =

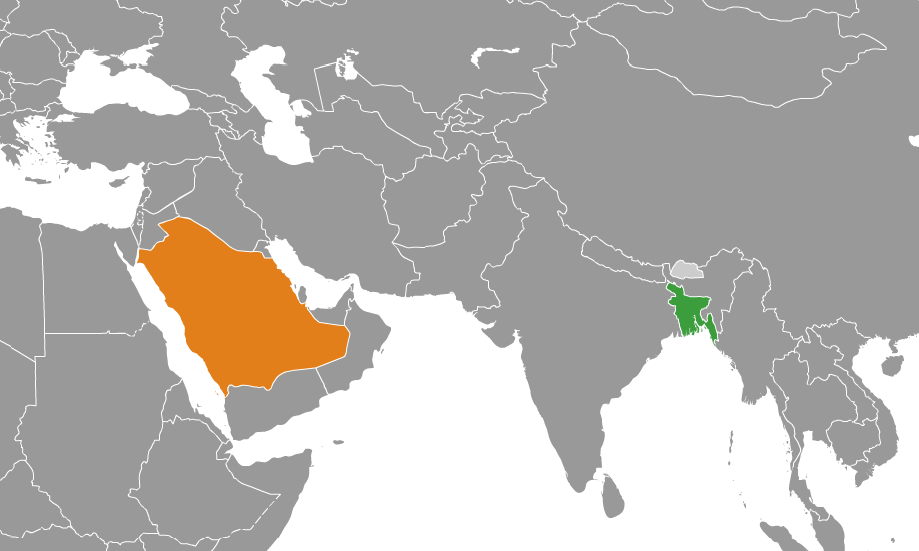

- Bangladesh: Saudi Arabia

Diplomatic mission
- Embassy of Bangladesh, Riyadh: Embassy of Saudi Arabia, Dhaka

Envoy
- Ambassador Md. Delwar Hossain: Ambassador Abdullah Zafer H. Bin Abiyah

Bangladesh–Saudi Arabia relations are the diplomatic and bilateral relations between Bangladesh and Saudi Arabia. Relations between the two nations had a strained beginning but have grown strong since then. Being a Muslim-majority state, Bangladesh attaches a special importance to its ties with Saudi Arabia, which is the birthplace of Islam. Both nations are members of the Organisation of Islamic Cooperation (OIC) and Saudi Arabia hosts a large proportion of the global Bangladeshi diaspora.

== History ==
The Sultan of Bengal, Ghiyasuddin Azam Shah, sponsored the construction of madrasas in the Hejaz. The schools became known as Bangaliyyah madrasas. Taqi al-Din al-Fasi, a contemporary Arab scholar, was a teacher at the madrasa in Makkah. A madrasa in Madinah was built at a place called Husn al-Atiq near the Prophet's Mosque. Several other Bengali Sultans also sponsored madrasas in the Hejaz, including Sultan Jalaluddin Muhammad Shah, who had close relations with the Sharif of Makkah and would gift him and other residents of the two holy cities with presents and robes of honours.

The introduction of Islam to the Bengali people has generated a connection to Saudi Arabia, as Muslims of means are required to visit the land once in their lifetime to complete the Hajj pilgrimage. Some Bengalis even settled in present-day Saudi Arabia and an early example is that of Haji Shariatullah's teacher Mawlana Murad, who was permanently residing in the city of Mecca in the early 1800s.

=== Liberation War ===
United States diplomat Kissinger sent letters to King Faisal, encouraging its participation in the Bangladesh Liberation War. F-86 aircraft were sent from Saudi Arabia to help camouflage the extent of PAF aircraft losses and perhaps as a potential training unit to prepare Pakistani pilots for an influx of more F-5s from Saudi Arabia.

== Establishment of diplomatic relations ==
Saudi Arabia and Bangladesh formally established diplomatic relations in 1975–76, after the Assassination of Sheikh Mujibur Rahman by mutinous officers in Bangladesh Army. The military regimes of Ziaur Rahman and Hussain Muhammad Ershad took steps to forge strong commercial and cultural ties with Saudi Arabia. Since the late 1980s, many both skilled and unskilled Bangladeshi workers have moved to Saudi Arabia; the number of Bangladeshis living in Saudi Arabia today exceeds 2.5 million. Many Muslim religious students and clerics also regularly travel to Saudi Arabia for study and religious work. As one of the most populous Muslim countries, Bangladesh is a major source of Hajj pilgrims. Saudi Arabia has become a major source of financing and economic aid to Bangladesh. In August 2014, Saudi Arabia banned Bangladeshi women from marrying Saudi nationals.

== See also ==
- Bangladeshis in Saudi Arabia
- Foreign relations of Bangladesh
- Foreign relations of Saudi Arabia
