= Bangladesh–Ivory Coast relations =

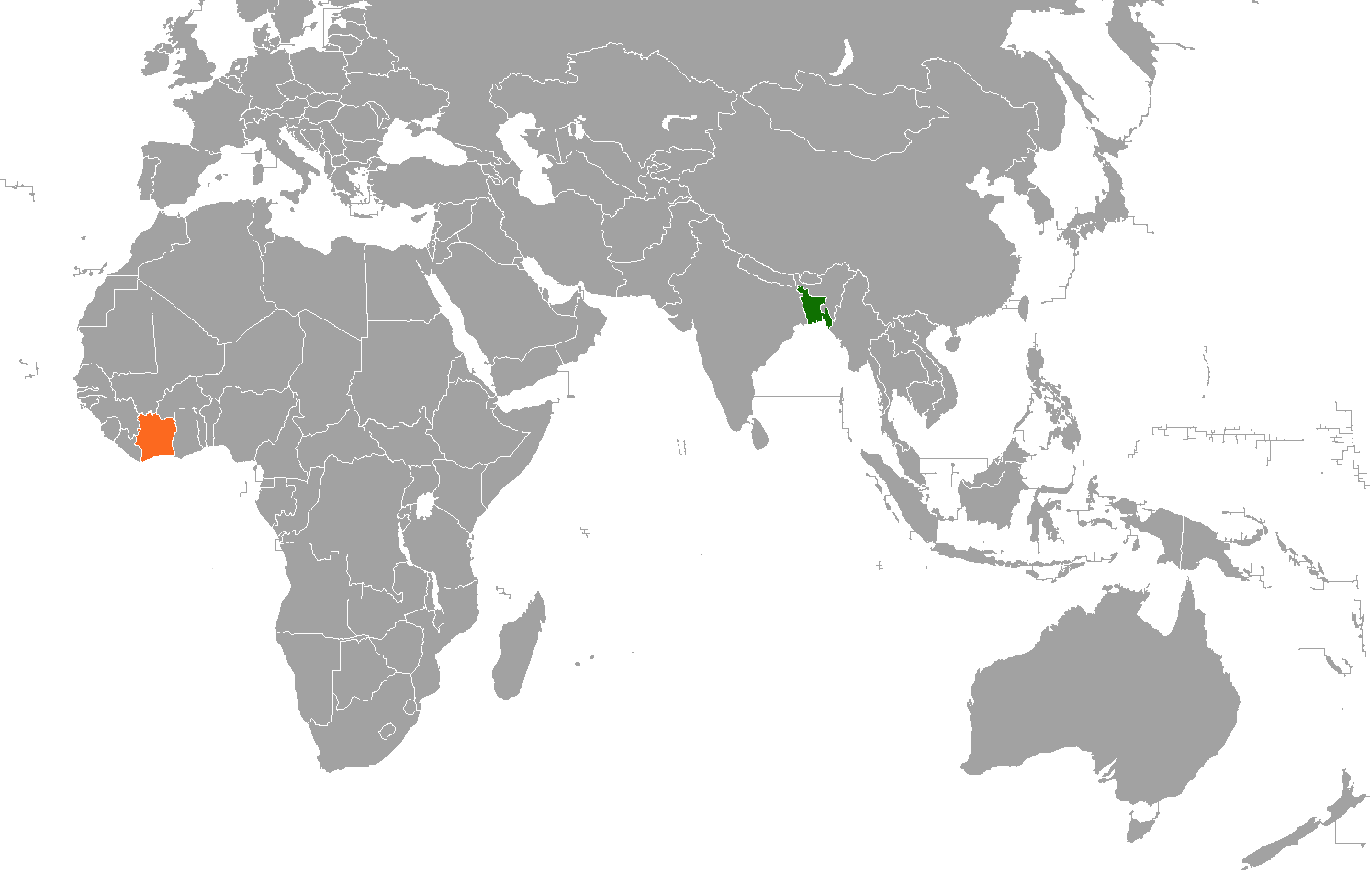

- Bangladesh: Ivory Coast

Bangladesh–Ivory Coast relations refer to the bilateral relations between Bangladesh and Ivory Coast.

== Quayes visit ==
Former foreign secretary of Bangladesh Mohamed Mijarul Quayes paid an official visit to Abidjan in 2010.

== Contributions of Bangladesh peace keepers ==
Bangladeshi peacekeepers have been serving in Ivory Coast since 2004 as part of the United Nations Operation in Côte d'Ivoire and are the largest contributor to the mission. Bangladeshi peace keepers provide security services and medical aid. In 2008 and 2013, the peace keepers were awarded the United Missions medal. In 2010, Major General Abdul Hafiz from the Bangladesh Army was appointed the Force Commander of the UN mission in Ivory Coast. The Bangladesh Air Force has also contributed troops to the mission and, as of 2014, has 104 personnel and three Bell-212 helicopters stationed in Ivory Coast.

== Agricultural cooperation ==
Ivory Coast has been identified as one of a number of West African countries, that might provide opportunities for Bangladeshi businesses to lease unused cultivable lands as part of food security programs. Ivory Coast businesses have also expressed an interest in implementing Bangladeshi agricultural technologies.

== Economic cooperation ==
Bangladeshi investors have expressed an interest in establishing fruit-processing industries in Ivory Coast. Bangladeshi medicines and ready made garments have been identified as products with significant demand in Ivory Coast.

== See also ==
- Foreign relations of Bangladesh
- Foreign relations of Ivory Coast
