= Austria–Bangladesh relations =

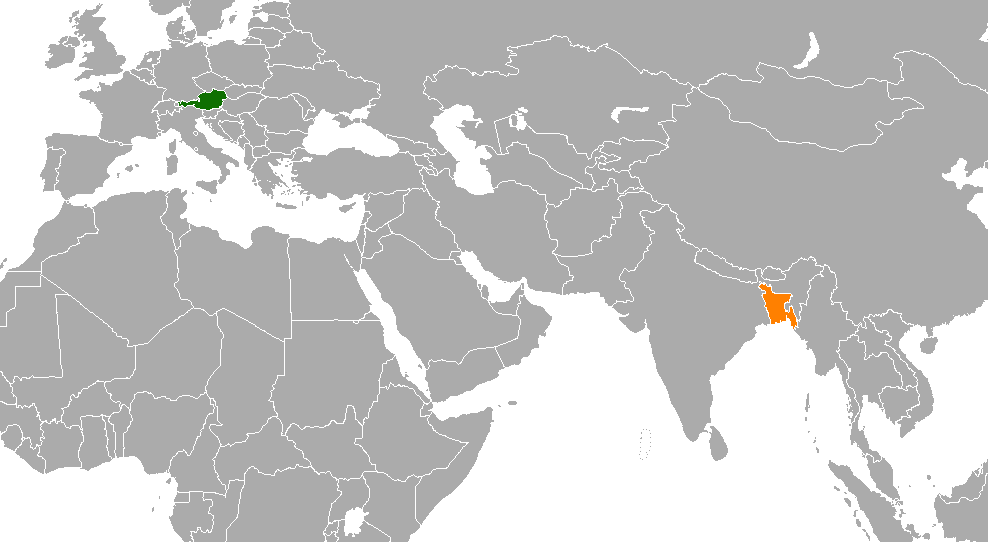

- Austria: Bangladesh

Bilateral relations exist between Bangladesh and Austria. Relations between the two countries have been considered cordial with both the countries working towards further strengthen it. Bangladesh has an embassy in Vienna which also serves as the Permanent Mission of Bangladesh to the United Nations and other international organizations.

== History ==
Because of the roughly 7000 km long distance, historical contacts between the two countries have been rather small. Following the establishment of the Ostend Company, Austrian ships began to travel to Bengal where they opened factories. The early history of ties between Austria and Bangladesh can be seen when a number of Bangladeshis travelled to the Austria for further education starting in the 20th century; namely Abdullah Al-Mamun Suhrawardy.

Large quantities of jute used to be transported from Bengal to Austria due to the efforts of the Ralli Brothers in the early 1800s. The two countries fought the two World Wars against each other, with Austria (as Austria-Hungary) being one of the dominant Central Powers in World War I and part of Adolf Hitler's national socialist Third Reich in World War II and Bangladesh being a part of the British Raj, a colony of the United Kingdom, which fought Austria (respectively Germany, which Austria was a part of from 1938 to 1945) on both occasions. Abdul Motaleb Malik, a notable Bengali politician, was the Pakistani ambassador to Austria in the 50s, long before the Independence of Bangladesh in 1971.

Prior to the security printing press's commissioning in 1989, the Bangla Post got some of their stamps printed in Austria.

== High level visits ==
Former foreign minister of Bangladesh Dipu Moni paid a visit to Vienna in 2013.

== Areas for cooperation ==
Bangladesh and Austria have identified power and energy, health, education, tourism, human resource development and waste management as promising sectors for bilateral cooperation between the two countries.

The education sector have been seen as a potential area for bilateral cooperation between the two countries. Bangladesh and Austria have put emphasis on educational exchange programs between the two countries. Bangladesh has sought Austria's cooperation to increase the number of Austrian scholarship for Bangladeshi students.

Bangladesh and Austria have shown their deep interest to expand the bilateral economic activities between the two countries and have been taking necessary steps in this regard. As of 2013, the volume of bilateral trade between the two countries stands at €400 million. About 30 Austria based multinational firms are operating in Bangladesh.

== Resident diplomatic missions ==
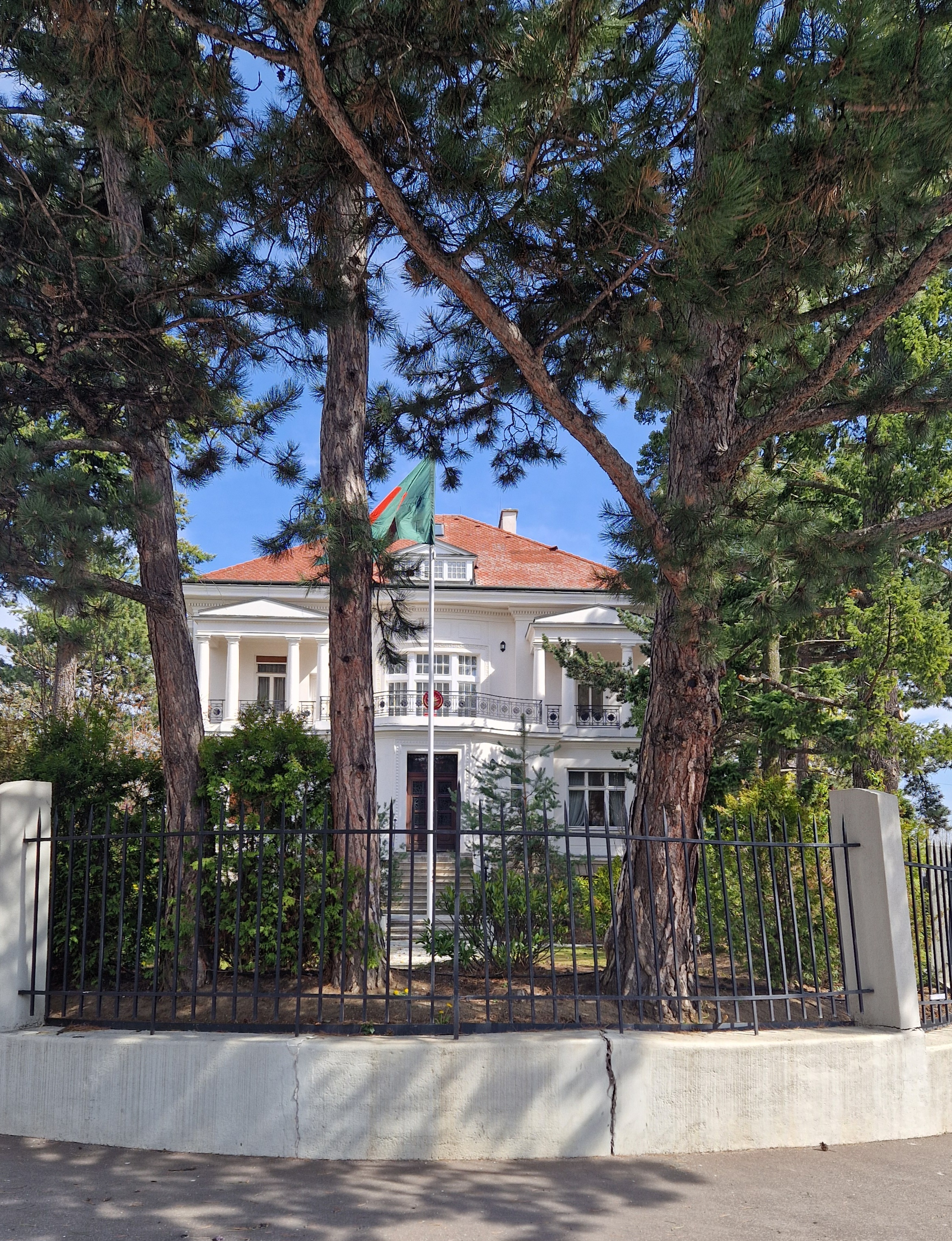
Embassy of Bangladesh in Vienna

- Austria is accredited to Bangladesh from its embassy in New Delhi, India.
- Bangladesh has an embassy in Vienna.

== See also ==
- Foreign relations of Austria
- Foreign relations of Bangladesh
