= Bangladesh–Liberia relations =

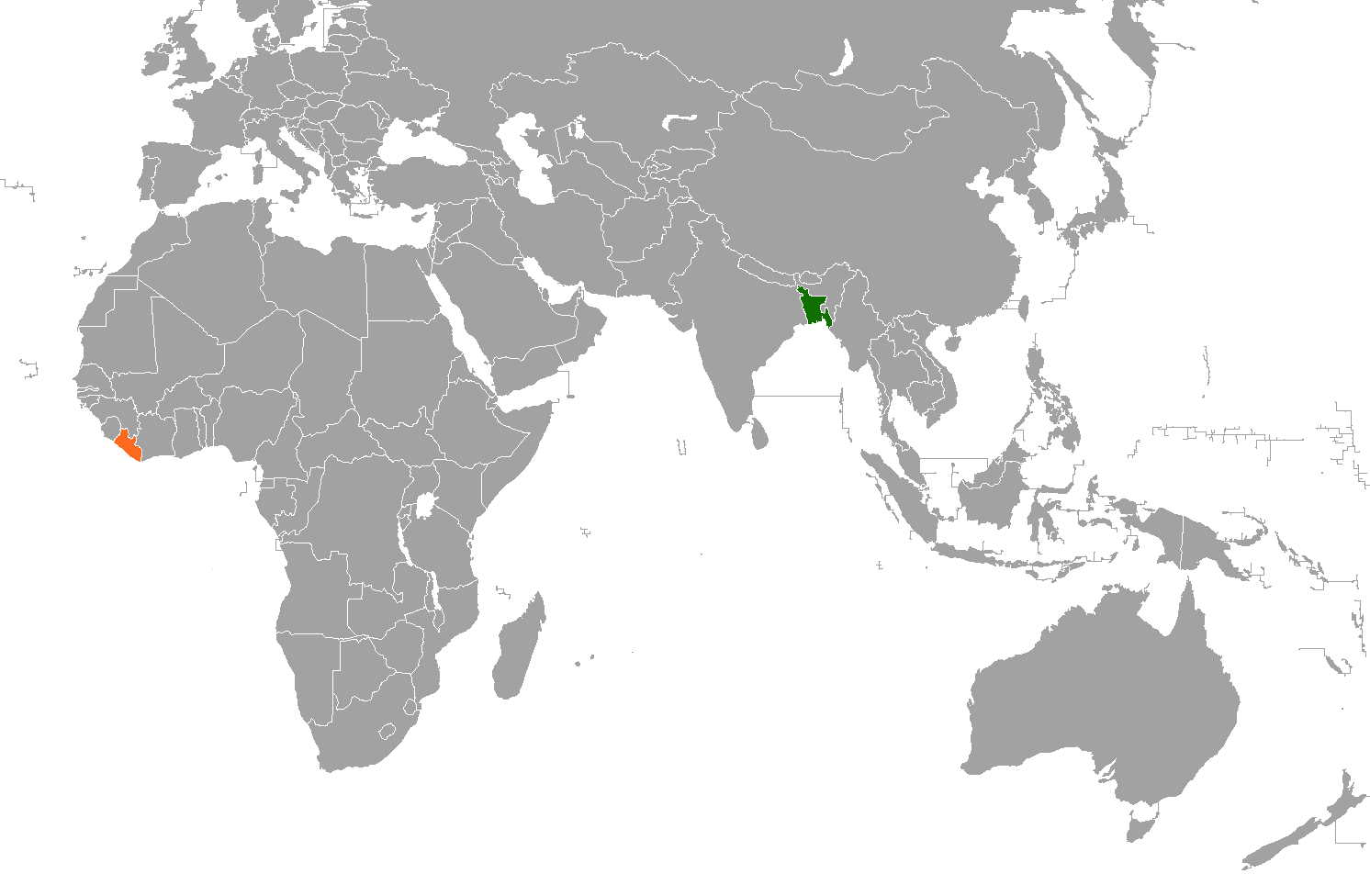

- Bangladesh: Liberia

Bangladesh–Liberia relations refer to the bilateral relations between Bangladesh and Liberia.

== Involvement of Bangladeshi peacekeepers ==
Bangladeshi peacekeepers have been deployed in Liberia since 2003 as part of United Nations Mission in Liberia (UNMIL). The peacekeepers have also been providing free medical treatment to the Liberians. There have also been some training programs by Bangladeshi peacekeepers for the skill development of the young Liberians, especially in the areas of computer/IT, tailoring, generator repair and maintenance, etc. Bangladeshi engineering battalion have been involved in constructing, repairing and maintaining several key infrastructural establishments. In 2008, Bangladeshi peacekeepers established "Bangladesh Square", a recreational and educational complex made up of a vocational training centre and a children's playground in the city of Gbarnga.

The peacekeepers have also provided medical treatment to over 5,000 Liberians. Liberian security officials complained that the Bangladeshi UNMIL contingent stationed at Logatuo border took with them two electricity generators and a water treatment plant when they withdrew in May 2013. It was also claimed the peacekeepers dismantled a housing structure, which previously housed about 20 UNMIL officials and gave the materials to the Muslim community at the Logatuo Border post. This has led to claims that the Bangladeshi contingent has favoured its fellow Muslims.

== Social development of Liberia ==
Several Bangladesh based NGOs are operating in Liberia most notably BRAC which is mainly working in the areas of microfinance, poultry farming, livestock, rural development etc.

== Trade and investment ==
In 2011, a Bangladeshi delegation visited Liberia to explore ways for trade and investment. Export Promotion Bureau of Bangladesh said it would invest some $3 million in both private and public sectors in Liberia. Bangladeshi investors have shown their interest in establishing pharmaceutical industries in Liberia which would create intensive white collar employment for the Liberians.

== See also ==
- Foreign relations of Bangladesh
- Foreign relations of Liberia
