= Embassy of Bangladesh, Madrid =

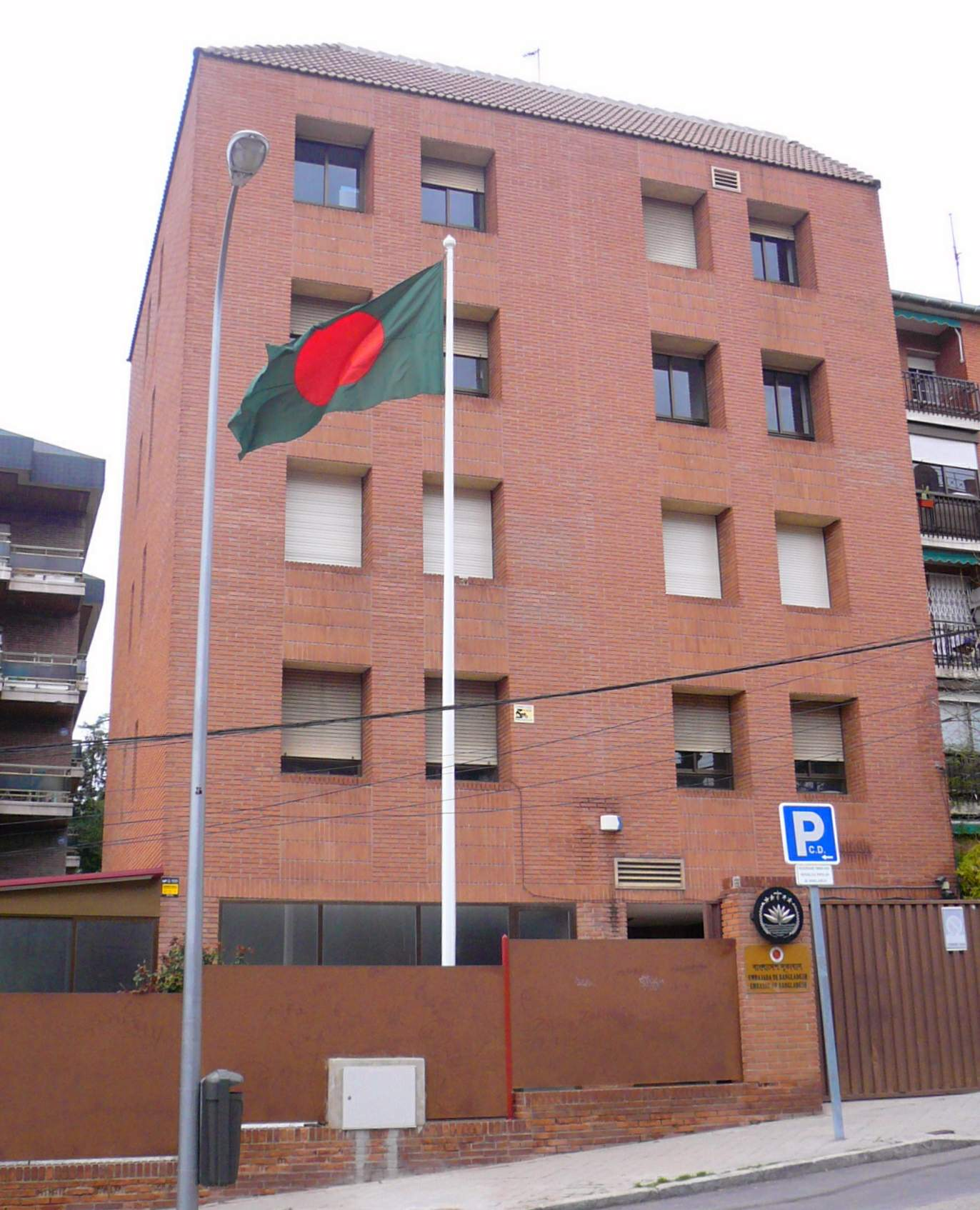
- Embassy of Bangladesh, Madrid
- Address: C/ de Manuel Marañón, 13, Cdad. Lineal, 28043 Madrid, Spain
- Coordinates: 40°27′26″N 3°39′21″W
- Opened: 1996
- Ambassador: Masudur Rahman
- Jurisdiction: Spain
- Website: Embassy, Madrid

The Embassy of Bangladesh, Madrid is a diplomatic mission of Bangladesh located in Spain. It is headed by the ambassador of Bangladesh to Spain.

== History ==
Bangladesh established its full diplomatic relationship with Spain in 1972. Since then until 1996 Bangladesh maintained its relationship through the Bangladesh Embassy at Paris. In 1996 Bangladesh opened an embassy at Madrid.
