= Embassy of Bangladesh, Paris =

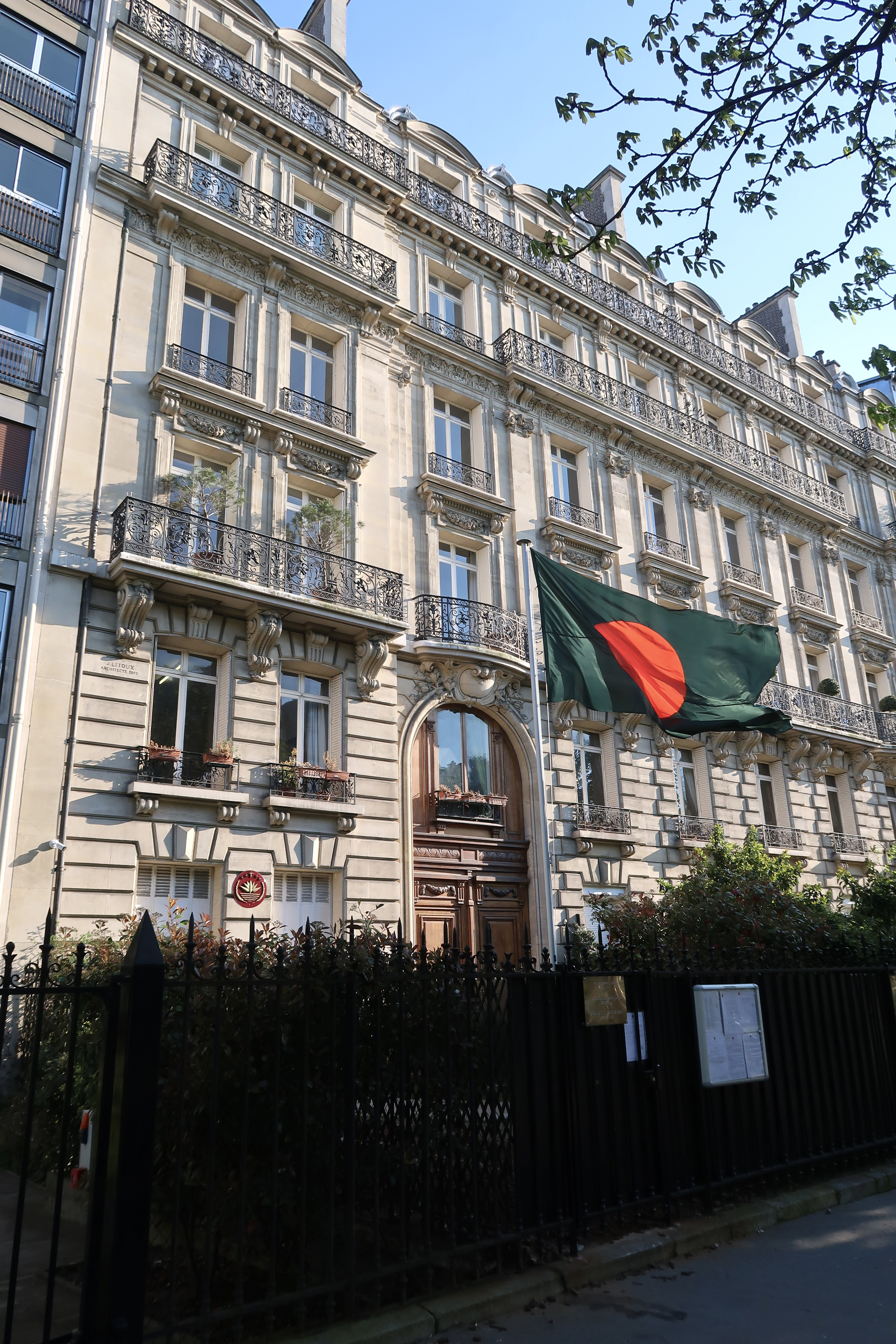
- Embassy of Bangladesh, Paris
- Address: 109 Avenue Henri-Martin, Paris, France
- Coordinates: 48°51′50″N 2°16′21″E
- Opened: 1972
- Ambassador: Khondker M. Talha
- Jurisdiction: France, Ivory Coast, UNESCO
- Website: Embassy, Paris

The Embassy of Bangladesh, Paris is the diplomatic mission of Bangladesh in France. The embassy also served as Permanent Mission of Bangladesh to UNESCO. It is headed by the ambassador of Bangladesh to France.

== History ==
The French Government formally recognized Bangladesh on February 14, 1972. The formal relationship on March 17, 1972. The same year Bangladesh opened its embassy at Paris to strength the relationship.
