= Bangladesh–Iraq relations =

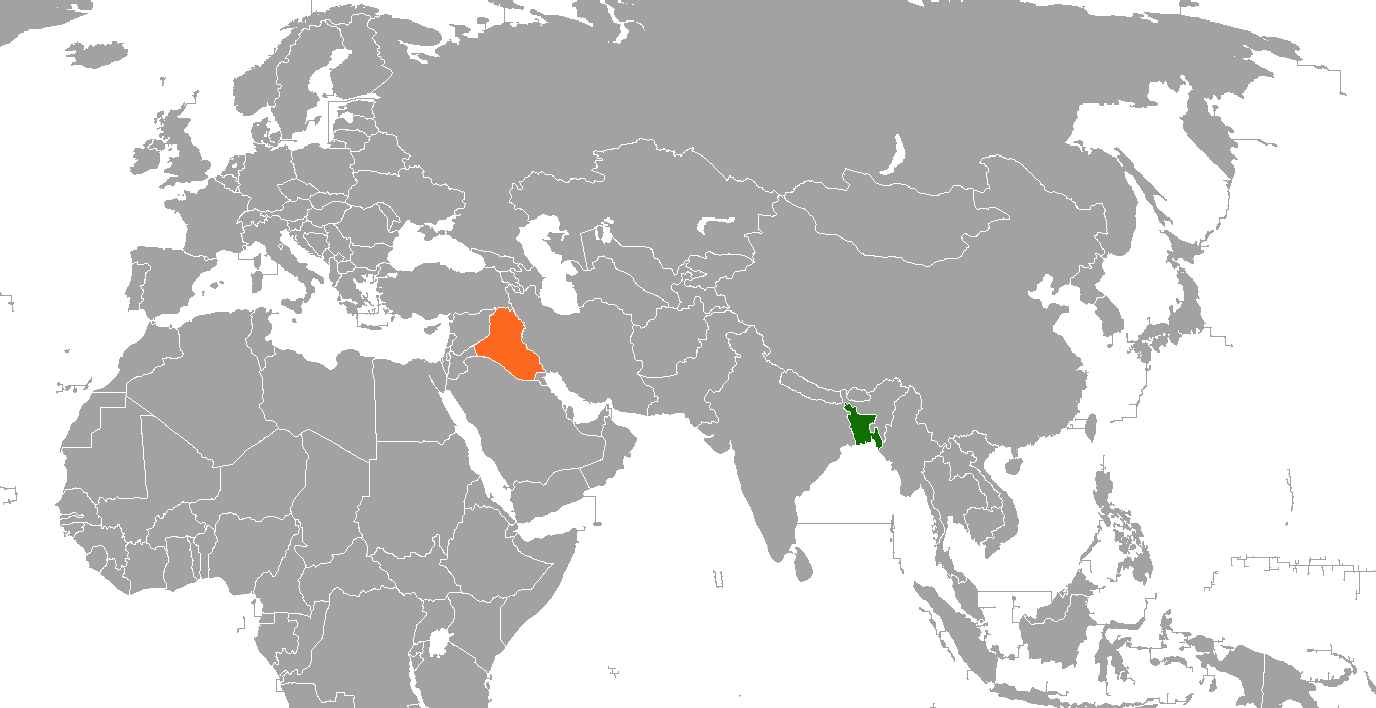

- Bangladesh: Iraq

Bangladesh–Iraq relations refer to the bilateral relations between Bangladesh and Iraq. Bangladesh has an embassy in Baghdad and Iraq has one in Dhaka. Muhammad Maksudul Haque is the Ambassador of Bangladesh to Iraq.

== History ==
After the Independence of Bangladesh in 1971, Iraq recognized Bangladesh as a sovereign country on 8 July 1972, becoming the first Arab country to do so. Bangladesh provided soldiers for patrolling the Iran–Iraq border in the aftermath of the Iran–Iraq War as part of the United Nations Iran–Iraq Military Observer Group. Bangladesh Army was part of the coalition in Operation Desert Storm that liberated Kuwait from Iraq.

Bangladesh's Expatriates Welfare and Overseas Employment Minister Khandaker Mosharraf Hossain and Iraq's Labour and Social Affairs Minister Nassar-Al-Rubaiee signed an Memorundam of Understanding to import labour from Bangladesh in 2009. Iraq has a resident embassy in Bangladesh. Bangladesh has expressed support for the territorial integrity of Iraq in 2008.

== Economic relations ==
Bangladesh has sent migrant workers to Iraq, before the Second Gulf War but stopped after the war. In 2009, Bangladesh started to send workers to Iraq again. Bangladeshi workers in Iraq have faced harassment and violence from both security forces and rebels. As of 2016, 43 thousand Bangladeshis are employed in Iraq.

== Expatriate relation ==
As with many other countries, many Bangladeshis migrate to gulf countries like Iraq for work.

== Resident diplomatic missions ==
- Bangladesh has an embassy in Baghdad.
- Iraq has an embassy in Dhaka.

== See also ==
- Foreign relations of Bangladesh
- Foreign relations of Iraq
