= Bangladesh–Kuwait relations =

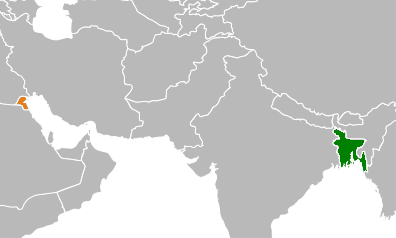

- Bangladesh: Kuwait

Bangladesh–Kuwait relations refer to the bilateral relations between Bangladesh and Kuwait.

== History ==
The Emir of Kuwait Sabah Al-Salim Al-Sabah visited Bangladesh in 1974. Bangladesh has a resident embassy in Kuwait. In 1991 after Iraq had invaded Kuwait, Bangladesh sent soldiers for the United Nations-led Operation Desert Shield to protect Saudi Arabia. Bangladeshi troops also fought in the First Gulf War as part of the international coalition. Bangladesh army lost 59 soldiers in the war as well as the mine-clearing operations after the war.

By 2016, 72 Bangladeshi soldiers had died and 152 were injured clearing landmines left behind by the Iraqi forces in the Gulf war under “Operation Reconstruction Kuwait”.

In March 2016 both nations signed a treaty to allow diplomatic passport holders of each country to travel without entry visas. The Kuwaiti NGO Revival of Islamic Heritage Society was banned in Bangladesh for financing terrorism.

Mohammad Shahid Islam, Member of Parliament of Bangladesh, was detained by CID in Kuwait on Human trafficking allegations. S.M. Abul Kalam is the Ambassador of Bangladesh to Kuwait.

== Economic relations ==
In 2000 there were an estimated two lakh (200,000) migrant Bangladeshi workers in Kuwait. Kuwait placed a ban on the import of Bangladeshi workers in 2006 over alleged malpractices in recruitment by Bangladeshi private recruitment agencies. In July 2008, 2000 Bangladeshi workers protested over living conditions and low wages which were 18 Kuwaiti dinar per month in Kuwait. Some of the workers were arrested for the protests but the Kuwait's labour ministry agreed to raise wages to 40 Kuwaiti dinar.

In February 2015 Kuwait again allowed the entry of Bangladeshi workers after a ban of 7 years; this was done after India placed new restriction on the migration of Indian workers to Kuwait. The total number of Bangladeshi migrant workers had been reduced to 190 thousand by 2014. By 2016 number has come to 200 thousand migrant workers. In May 2016 the Government Kuwait agreed to help the Government of Bangladesh establish an oil refinery in Bangladesh.
