= Khandaker Masudul Alam =

Bangladeshi diplomat (born 1972)

Khandker Masudul Alam
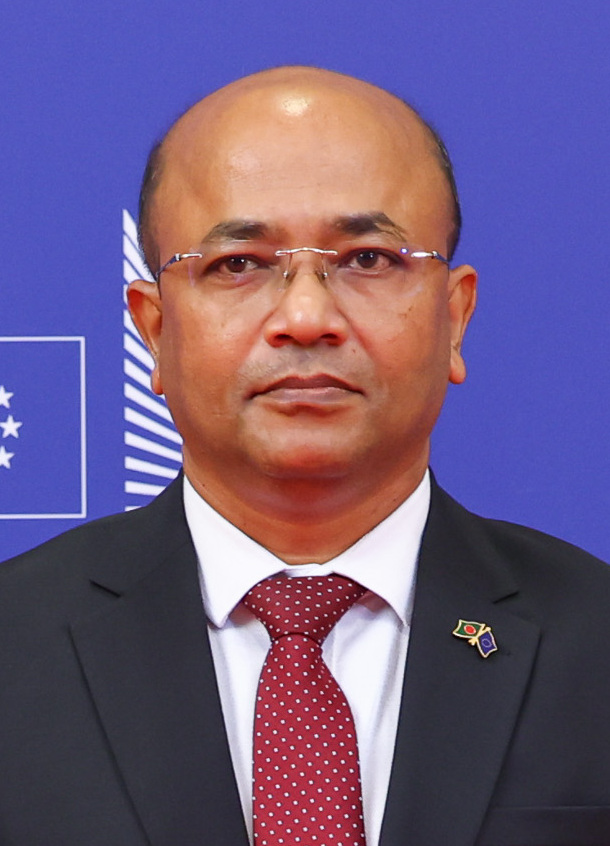
- Alam in 2025

Ambassador of Bangladesh to Belgium
- Incumbent
- Assumed office March 2025
- President: Mohammed Shahabuddin
- Prime Minister: Muhammad Yunus (Chief Adviser)
- Preceded by: Mahbub Hassan Saleh

Personal details
- Born: 15 June 1972 (age 54) Bangladesh
- Education: Bangladesh University of Engineering and Technology; University of Dhaka; Hiroshima University
- Occupation: Diplomat

Khandker Masudul Alam (born 15 June 1972) is a Bangladeshi career diplomat and the incumbent ambassador of Bangladesh to Belgium, Luxembourg and European Union since March 2025. He served as the Chief of Protocol at the Ministry of Foreign Affairs of Bangladesh. He was the Director General (North America) at the Ministry of Foreign Affairs.

== Early life and education ==
Alam was born on 15 June 1972. He completed his Bachelor of Science in Electrical and Electronics Engineering from the Bangladesh University of Engineering and Technology in 1997. He completed an MBA in Finance at the Institute of Business Administration, University of Dhaka, in 2002. Alam later earned a Master of Arts in International Relations from Hiroshima University in Japan in 2008. He also underwent intensive Japanese language training at Hiroshima University between 2005 and 2006, complementing his academic and diplomatic capabilities.

== Career ==
Alam entered the Bangladesh Foreign Service in 2003. From 2003 to 2009, he served in the Ministry of Foreign Affairs in Dhaka as Assistant Secretary and later as Senior Assistant Secretary. In 2009, he was posted to the Embassy of Bangladesh in Stockholm, Sweden, where he worked successively as Second Secretary, First Secretary, and Counsellor until 2012. He was then transferred to the Embassy of Bangladesh in Seoul, South Korea, where he served as Counsellor from 2012 to 2016.

Throughout his career, Alam has participated in multiple training programs. He completed the Foundation Training Course at the Bangladesh Public Administration Training Centre in 2002 and received Specialised Diplomatic Training at the Bangladesh Foreign Service Academy in 2003. He later attended an E-Governance Training Programme at the National University of Singapore in 2008, enhancing his knowledge of digital governance in international affairs.

Returning to Dhaka, Alam served as Director at the Ministry of Foreign Affairs from 2016 to 2019. He was subsequently appointed as the Consul General at the Bangladesh Consulate General in Sydney, Australia, a role he held from 2019 to 2022. Following this overseas posting, he was promoted to the position of Director-General at the Ministry of Foreign Affairs, where he served from 2022 to 2024. He was the Director General (North America) when he received Donald Lu, Assistant Secretary of State for South and Central Asian Affairs, at the airport, who had arrived to meet the head of the interim government, Muhammad Yunus. He held talks with Afreen Akhter, Deputy Assistant Secretary in the Bureau of South and Central Asian Affairs (SCA) for Nepal, Sri Lanka, Bangladesh, Bhutan, and the Maldives. He was appointed Chief of Protocol in September 2024 after the fall of the Sheikh Hasina-led Awami League government, replacing Nayem Uddin Ahmed.

In November 2024, the government decided to appoint Alam as the Ambassador of Bangladesh to Belgium and the permanent representative to the European Union.

== Personal life ==
Alam is fluent in Bengali and English and has working knowledge of Japanese and French. He is married and has two sons.
