= Bangladesh–Jordan relations =

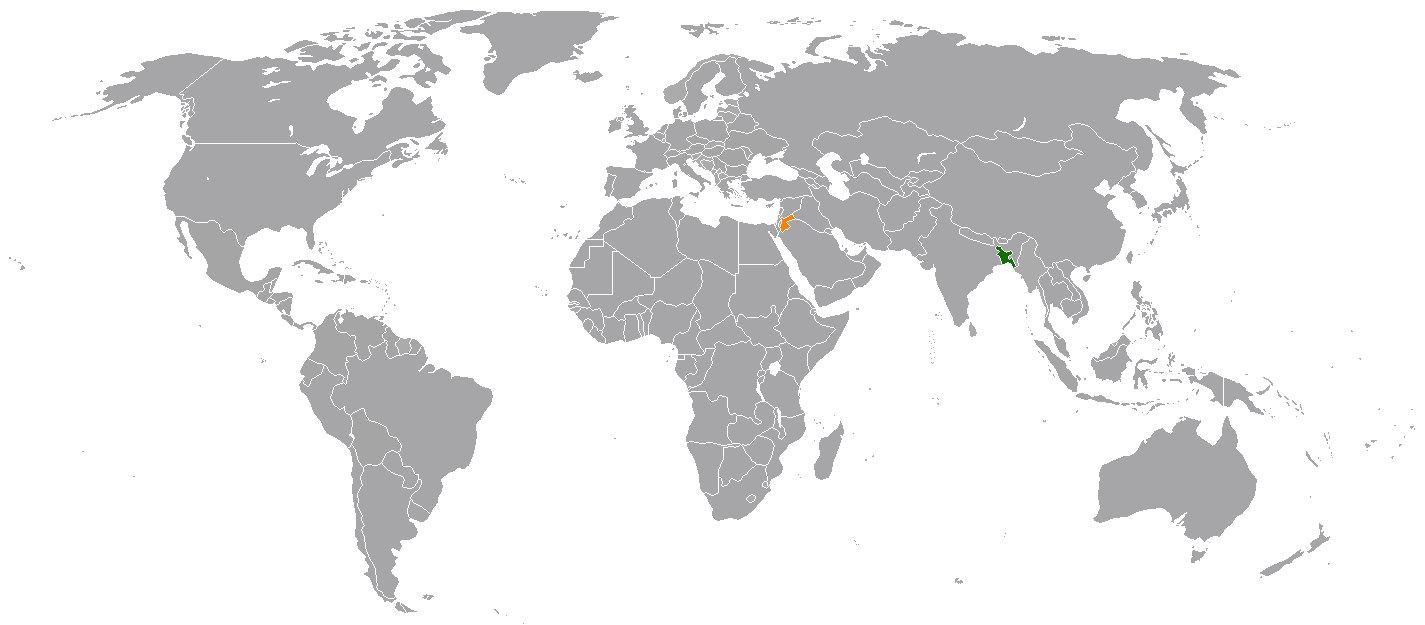

- Bangladesh: Jordan

Bangladesh–Jordan relations refer to the bilateral relations between Bangladesh and Jordan. Both countries are members of the Non-Aligned Movement, the Organisation of Islamic Cooperation and the United Nations.

== History ==
During the Indo-Pakistani War of 1971, Jordan maintained a pro-Pakistani position. Jordan dispatched ten F-104 aircraft to Masroor Air Base in Karachi, Pakistan to bolster Pakistani air defenses late into the conflict.

Following Bangladesh's independence in 1971, relations gradually developed as Bangladesh established diplomatic ties with several Middle Eastern countries. Jordan and Bangladesh formally established diplomatic relations in October 1973. Bangladesh subsequently joined the United Nations in September 1974.

After establishing relations, the two countries developed ties primarily through multilateral diplomacy, including those through membership in international organizations such as the Non-Aligned Movement and the Organization of Islamic Cooperation.

A major development of relations happened when Bangladesh established its resident embassy in Amman in 1998, which increased diplomatic engagement and fostered the development of new economic and labor ties between the two countries.

In 2023, Bangladesh and Jordan marked the 50th anniversary of the establishment of diplomatic relations, emphasizing continued cooperation in economic, political, and social fields.

== Agricultural cooperation ==
In 2011, Bangladesh and Jordan signed a memorandum of understanding on agricultural cooperation. According to the MoU, the two countries "will exchange scientific materials and information and exchange visits of scientists and engineers in the areas of agricultural science and technology, field level extension, agricultural production and agro-processing." Under the MoU, Bangladesh and Jordan plan to form a joint working group consisting of experts from both countries to facilitate cooperation in the sector.

== Economic relations ==
Bangladesh and Jordan have expressed interest in expanding trade and investment. Jordan is one of the largest Bangladeshi labour export markets. In 2011, Jordan lifted a ban on the importation of labour from Bangladesh but tightened the recruitment process soon after as a result of some cases of sexual exploitation of the female workers and labor strikes. In 2012, Bangladesh and Jordan signed a memorandum of understanding in order to monitor migration, ensure the safety of migrants and reduce migration costs. In the same year, Bangladesh and Jordan prepared a draft agreement to enhance cooperation on trade. According to the agreement, the two countries will grant "Most Favored Nation" status to each other and establish a joint trade committee. In 2023, a memorandum of understanding was signed between Bangladeshi and Jordani pharmaceutical business bodies. The MOU outlines that recruitment and employment of Bangladeshi workers will be conducted through official contracts documented by both countries' authorities which emphasizes preserving the rights of workers and employers in accordance with relevant legislation, laws, and international standard.

== Bangladeshi labour in Jordan ==
As of 2011, there were about 30,000 Bangladeshis living in Jordan, with most working in service industries.

== Diplomatic missions ==
The Bangladeshi embassy is located in Amman. and the ambassador is Nahida Sobhan.

== See also ==
- Foreign relations of Bangladesh
- Foreign relations of Jordan
