= Bangladesh–Italy relations =

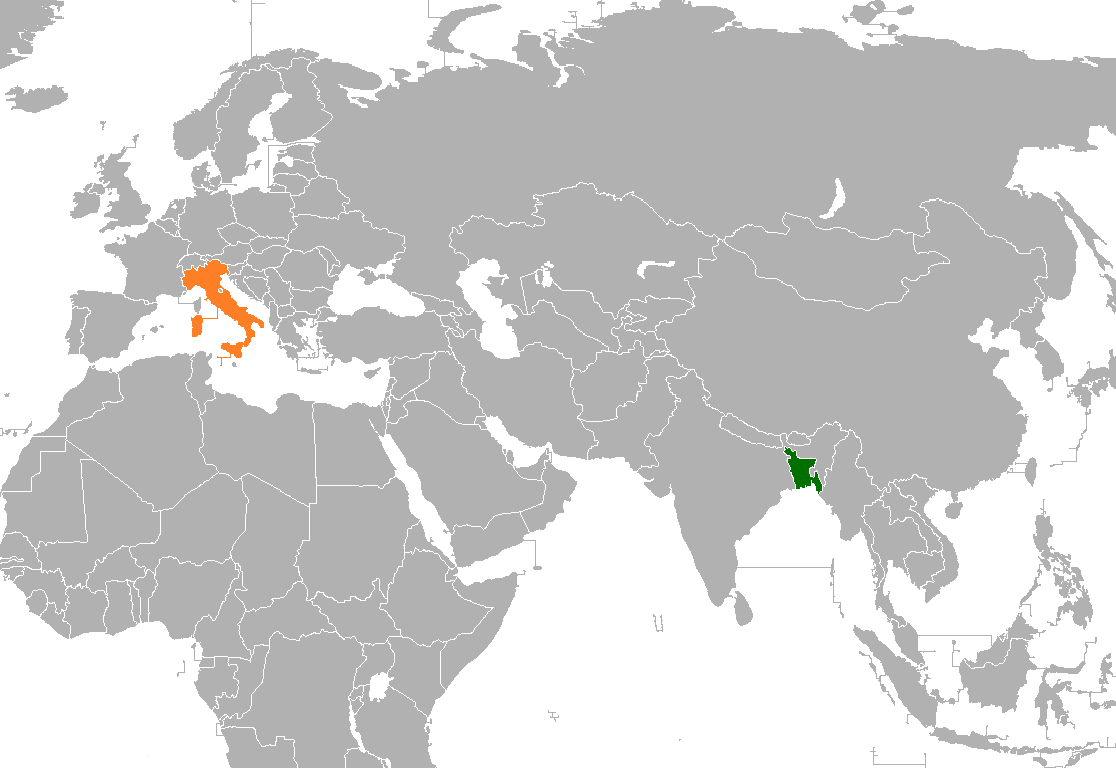

- Bangladesh: Italy

Bangladesh–Italy relations are the bilateral relations between Bangladesh and Italy. Bangladesh maintains its embassy in Rome while Italy has an embassy in Dhaka.

== History ==
Italy established official relations with Bangladesh in 1972, after gaining independence from Pakistan. In 1974, Italy was one of the countries that sponsored the admission of Bangladesh to the United Nations. In 2014, Bangladesh Prime Minister Sheikh Hasina paid an official visit to Italy.

== Educational and technological cooperation ==
In 2000, an agreement on "Scientific and Technological Cooperation" was signed between Bangladesh and Italy. As per the agreement, the two countries have been exchanging scientists, researchers and technicians as well as providing study grants. Italy has been accommodating an average of 25 Bangladeshi researchers annually to study at the Abdus Salam International Centre for Theoretical Physics.

== Economic relations ==
Bangladesh and Italy have formed the 'Italy-Bangladesh Chamber of Commerce and Industry (IBCCI)' to boost bilateral economic relations. Between 2000 and 2006, the bilateral trade between the two countries increased by more than 200%. As of 2012, the total amount of the bilateral trade stood at $1.286 billion, of which Bangladesh's export to Italy accounts for $1.036 billion. Bangladesh's main export items to Italy include frozen food, agri-products, tea, leather, raw jute, jute goods, knitwear, woven garments etc. Italy's chief export items to Bangladesh include machineries, electronic products, vehicles, aircraft, vessels and associated transport equipments. Bangladesh and Italy have reached an agreement to address the issue of unauthorized migration to Italy. As part of a bilateral migration and mobility arrangement, Italy has agreed to welcome skilled workers from Bangladesh, with a focus on industries such as construction, shipbuilding, and hospitality. This collaboration aims to regulate migration between the two countries and ensure that the process is conducted legally and with mutual benefits in mind.

== Bangladeshi diaspora in Italy ==
As of 2016, there were 142,000 Bangladeshis living in Italy.

== See also ==
- Foreign relations of Bangladesh
- Foreign relations of Italy
