= Embassy of Bangladesh, Riyadh =

- Address: 8039 Dareen St, Al Safarat, Riyadh 12512, Saudi Arabia
- Coordinates: 24°41′9″N 46°37′53″E
- Opened: 1973
- Ambassador: Md. Delwar Hossain
- Jurisdiction: Saudi Arabia, Djibouti
- Website: Embassy, Riyadh

The Embassy of Bangladesh, Riyadh is a diplomatic mission of Bangladesh located in Saudi Arabia. It is headed by the ambassador of Bangladesh to Saudi Arabia. The mission also served for Djibouti.

== History ==
Bangladesh established a representative office at Jeddah in 1972 to Organisation of Islamic Cooperation and Saudi Arabia. In 1975 Saudi Arabia recognized Bangladesh as a sovereign state, the mission become Embassy of Bangladesh in the same year. The following year Embassy of Bangladesh moved to Saudi Arabia's capital Riyadh. And the post at Jeddah formally closed that year.

10 years later in 1985 Bangladesh again opened a consulate and Permanent Mission to OIC in Jeddah.

== Consulate and Permanent Mission ==
Bangladesh has a Consulate General in Jeddah which also served as permanent mission to OIC. The mission is headed by the Consular General to Jeddah.
