= Bangladesh–Switzerland relations =

- Bangladesh: Switzerland

Bangladesh–Switzerland relations refer to the bilateral relations between Bangladesh and Switzerland. Switzerland has an embassy in Dhaka and Bangladesh has one, with a resident ambassador, in Geneva.

== History ==
Switzerland recognized Bangladesh as an independent country on 13 March 1972 and established diplomatic ties between both countries. The two countries hold regular political consultations between their foreign ministries since 2013.

Swiss Confederation president Alain Berset visited Bangladesh in February 2018. The Swiss Arts Council Pro Helvetia is a partner of the Dhaka Art Summit.

== Economic relations ==
From 2010 to 2016, trade between Bangladesh and Switzerland more than doubled. In 2016 bilateral trade was worth 591.5 million Swiss franc. Major exports of Switzerland to Bangladesh are chemicals, textile machines, and pharmaceuticals. Readymade garments and textiles make up 90 percent of Bangladesh's export to Switzerland. There are around 100 Swiss companies operating in Bangladesh. Bangladeshi nationals had about 550 million Swiss Francs in Banks in Switzerland as off 2016. In 2017 Swiss investment in Bangladesh increased by 17 percent. The Swiss government plans to encourage Swiss investment in Climate Change technology in Bangladesh.

== See also ==
- Foreign relations of Bangladesh
- Foreign relations of Switzerland
