= Bangladesh–European Union relations =

- European Union: Bangladesh

Bangladesh–European Union relations are the foreign relations between Bangladesh and European Union. The EU is the largest export destination of Bangladesh. The present ambassador of the EU to Bangladesh is Charles Whiteley.

== History ==
In 2016 the Bangladesh-EU Dialogue on Migration Management was held in Meghna state guest house in Dhaka. The dialogue focused on irregular migrations and ways to manage it and raise awareness about it in Bangladesh. The EU has expressed its disappointment over new regulations concerning NGOs in 2016.

== Cultural relations ==
The EU has campaigned to improve labor conditions, democracy and freedom of expression in Bangladesh. In 2013 Bangladesh signed the Sustainability compact with the EU to strengthen labor conditions in the country. The EU has also promoted the abolition of the death penalty in Bangladesh.

== Economic relations ==
In 2001 the EU-Bangladesh cooperation agreement was signed which laid the foundation of trade relations. The European Union provided Bangladesh duty-free access to the Union market under the Everything But Arms (EBA) initiative. The European Union is Bangladesh's largest trading parting accounting for 24 percent Bangladesh's total trade. Bangladesh in the unions 35 largest trading partner. Clothing makes 90 percent of all export from Bangladesh to the EU. EU exports consists mostly of machinery and transport equipment at 49 percent. The Everything But Arms scheme is expected to end in 2021 when Bangladesh is predicted to graduate to the developing country bracket.

In April 2026, the European Union and Bangladesh initialed a Partnership and Cooperation Agreement (PCA), a comprehensive framework covering 82 articles on political dialogue, trade, energy, climate action, security, and maritime affairs. Bangladesh became the first South Asian country to conclude such a modern agreement with the EU, which will replace the 2001 Cooperation Agreement once ratified.

In August 2025, Bangladesh proposed a free trade agreement (FTA) with the EU to retain duty‑free access after its LDC graduation. The EU began an internal assessment of the proposal in May 2026; without a deal, Bangladeshi exports would face a 10% tariff from 2029.

== Ambassadors ==
Ambassador	In office
(Republic of Ireland) William Hanna	2010–2014
(France) Pierre Mayaudon	2014–2017
(Netherlands) Rensje Teerink	2017–2021
(Netherlands) / (United Kingdom) Charles Whiteley	2021 -

== Bangladesh's foreign relations with EU member states ==
- Austria
- Belgium
- Bulgaria
- Croatia
- Cyprus
- Czech Republic
- Denmark
- Estonia
- Finland
- France
- Germany
- Greece
- Hungary
- (Republic of Ireland) Ireland
- Italy
- Latvia
- Lithuania
- Luxembourg
- Malta
- Netherlands
- Poland
- Portugal
- Romania
- Slovakia
- Slovenia
- Spain
- Sweden

== See also ==
- Foreign relations of Bangladesh
- Foreign relations of the European Union
