= Aksaray (disambiguation) =

Aksaray (variants Aksarai, Aqsaray, Aqsarai, Ak-Sarai, Aq-Saray etc.) or Ak Saray, meaning "white palace" in several Turkic languages, may refer to:

== Places ==
- Aksaray, a city in Aksaray Province, Turkey
- Aksaray Province, a province or “il” in Turkish, of Turkey, named after the above city, of which it is the capital
- Aksaray, Istanbul, a neighborhood of Istanbul
- Ak Saray, newly constructed official residence of the President of Turkey in Ankara, Turkey

== Personal names ==
- Aqsara'i (died 1379), Persian physician

== See also ==
- White Palace (disambiguation)
- Oqsaroy (disambiguation)
