= White Palace =

White Palace may refer to:

- White Palace (film), a 1990 film starring Susan Sarandon and James Spader
- White Palace (Ankara), former name of official residence of the President of Turkey in Ankara, Turkey
- White Palace (Ctesiphon), former main residence of Sassanian monarchs
- White Palace (Baghdad), a former guest house in used by the Kingdom of Iraq
- White Palace (Marghazar), palace in Swat, Khyber Pakhtunkhwa, Pakistan
- White Palace (Lhasa), former name of Potala Palace in Lhasa, Tibet, de jure official residence of the Dalai Lama
- Beli Dvor, former residence of the Yugoslavian royal family in Belgrade, Serbia
- Palazzo Bianco, an art gallery in Genoa, Italy
- Safed Baradari (lit. 'White Palace'), a white marbled building in Lucknow Uttar Pradesh, India
