= Presidential Palace, Hanoi =

Vietnamese palace

Coordinates: 21°2′20″N 105°50′3″E

Presidential Palace
- Phủ Chủ tịch (Vietnamese)
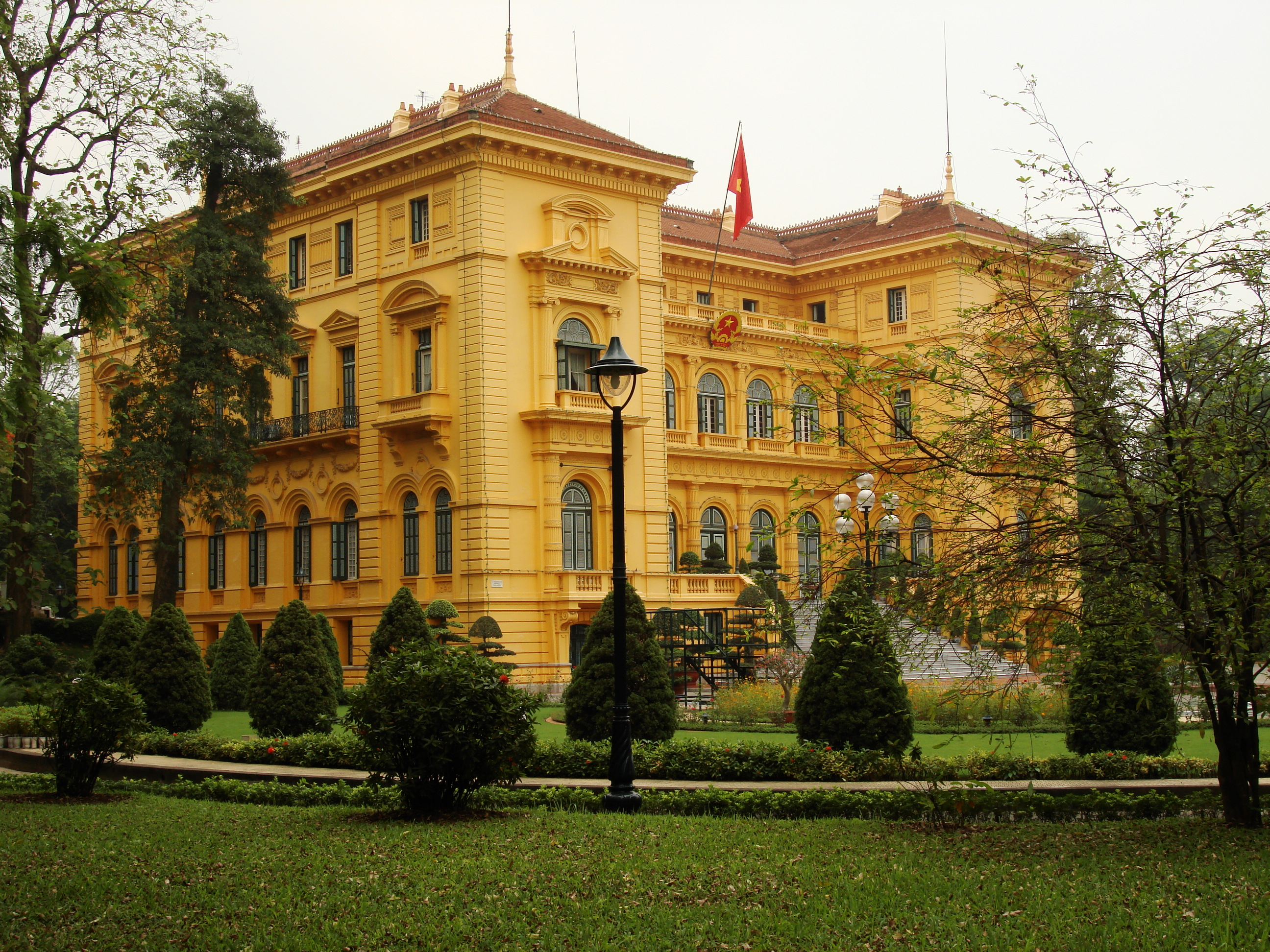
- Interactive map of Presidential Palace
- Location: Ba Đình, Hanoi, Vietnam

History
- Built for: Governor-General of French Indochina

Site notes
- Architect: Auguste Henri Vildieu
- Architectural styles: French Colonial, Italian Renaissance

The Presidential Palace of Vietnam (Vietnamese: Phủ Chủ tịch), located in the city of Hanoi, currently is the official residence of the president of Vietnam and the seat of the presidential office. Before 1954, it was named the Palace of the Governor-General of Indochina (French: Palais du Gouvernement général de l'Indochine, Vietnamese: Phủ Toàn quyền Đông Dương).

In the present, the building serves as a location for state ceremonial activities while Tonkin Palace functions as the headquarters of Office of President of Vietnam.

== History ==
The palace was built between 1900 and 1906 to house the French governor-general of Indochina and was constructed by the architect Charles Lichtenfelder, this is often incorrectly attributed to Auguste Henri Vildieu, who was the official French architect for French Indochina. Like most French colonial architecture, the palace is pointedly European. The only visual cues that it is located in Vietnam at all are mango trees growing on the grounds.

The yellow palace stands behind wrought iron gates flanked by sentry boxes. It incorporates elements of Italian Renaissance design, including:

- aedicules
- a formal piano nobile reached by a grand staircase
- broken pediments
- classical columns
- quoins

When Vietnam achieved independence in 1954, Ho Chi Minh was claimed to have refused to live in the grand structure for symbolic reasons, although he still received state guests there; he eventually built a traditional Vietnamese stilt house and carp pond on the grounds. His house and the grounds were made into the Presidential Palace Historical Site in 1975.

The palace hosts government meetings. Although the palace itself is not open to the public, one may walk around the grounds for a fee.

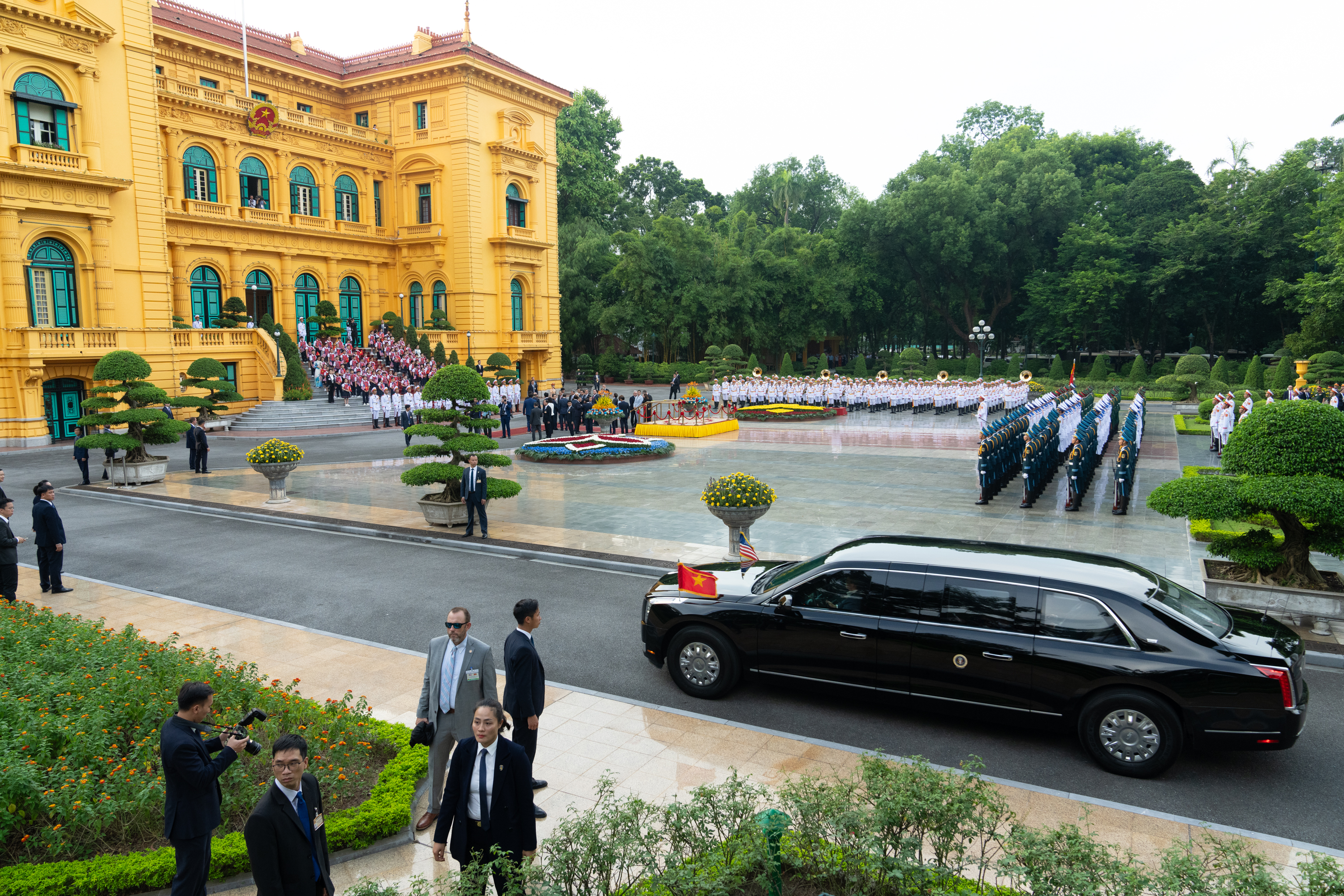
The Presidential Palace venue as seen in Biden's 2023 state visit to Vietnam.

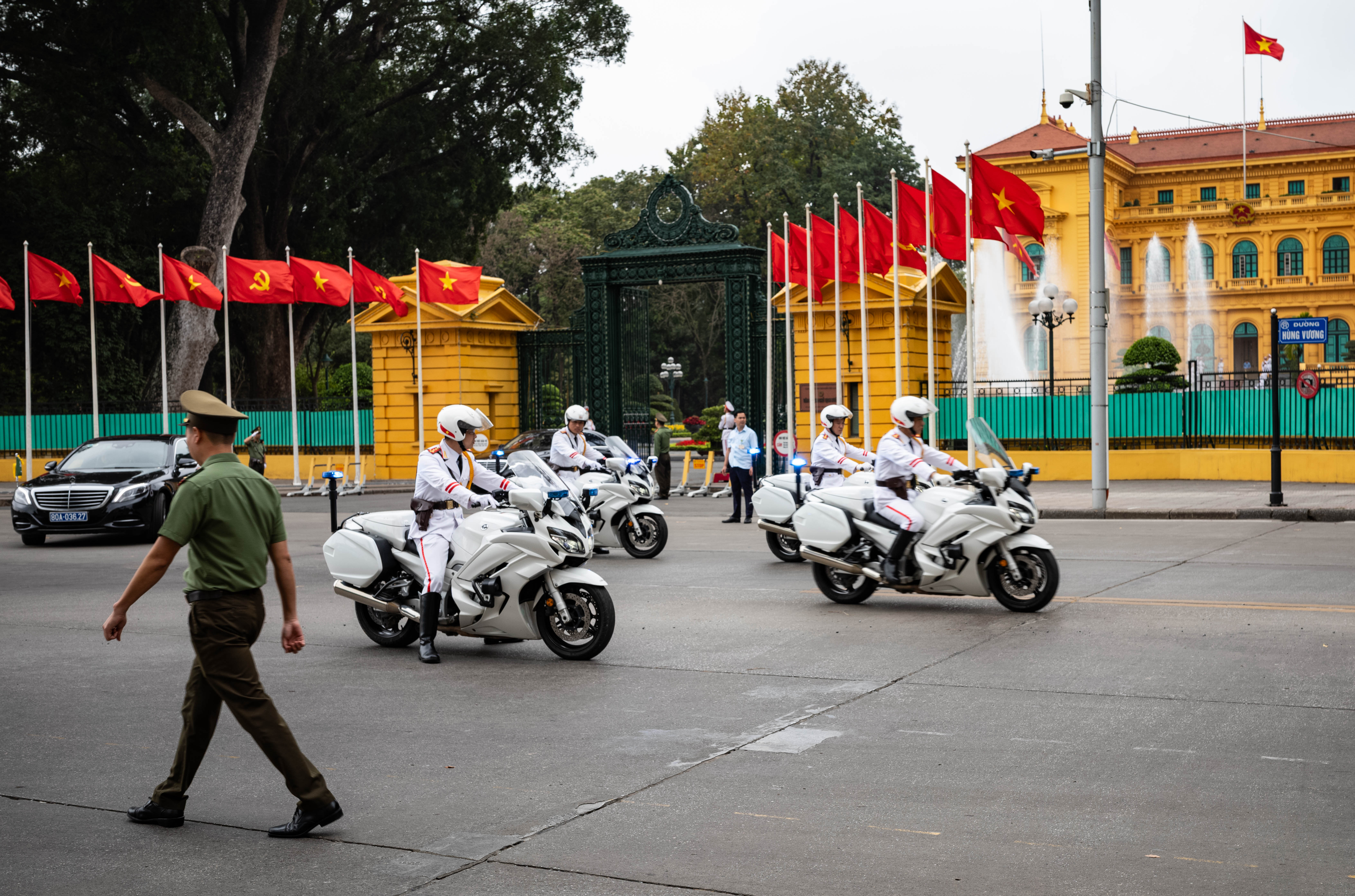
In front of the Palace, as seen in 2026.

The Ho Chi Minh Mausoleum is located near the palace. On February 27, 2019, Donald Trump officially met Kim Jong-un for the second time in Hanoi's Presidential Palace.

== Gallery ==
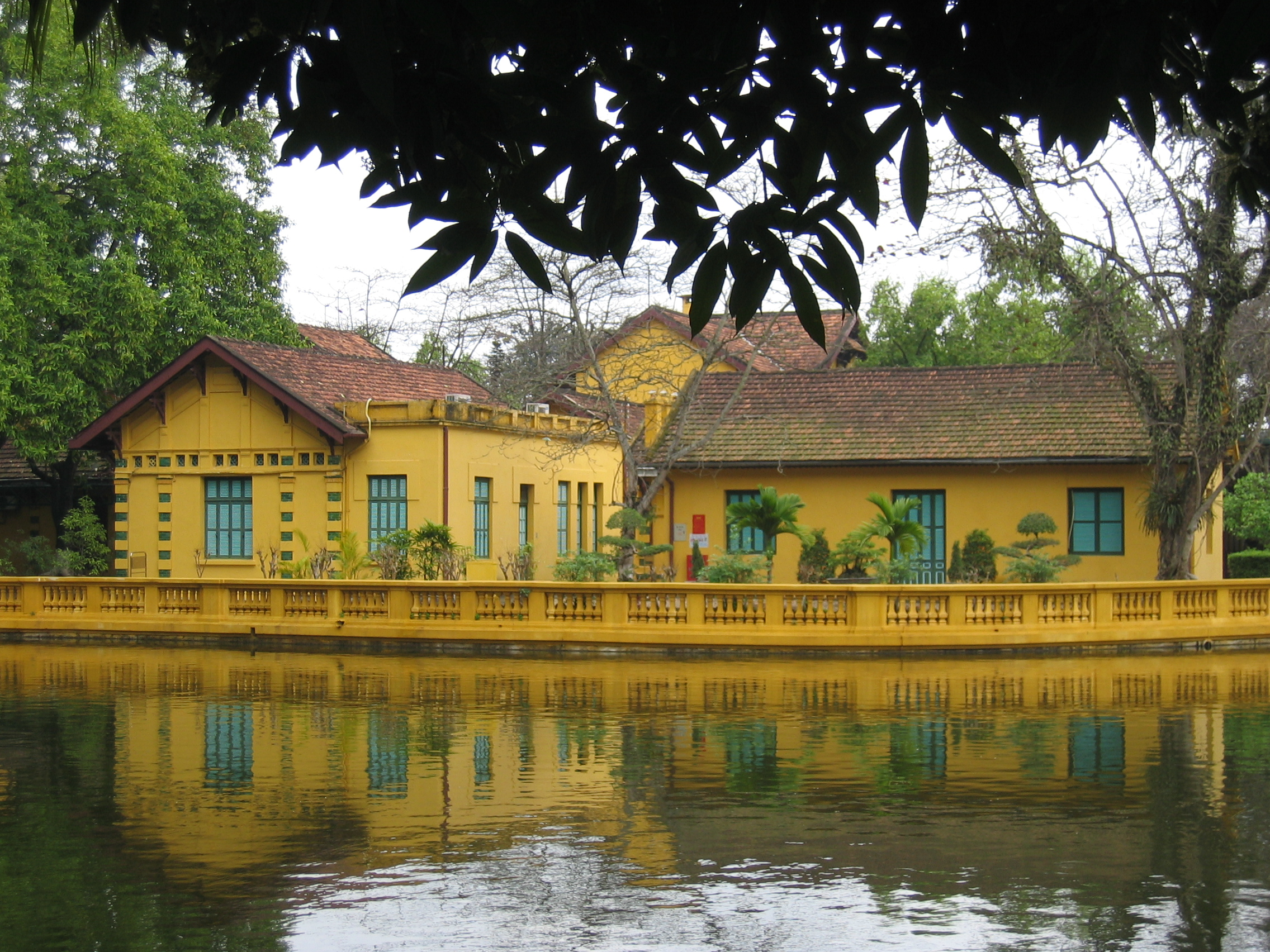
House No. 54, where President Ho Chi Minh lived and worked from 1954 to 1958

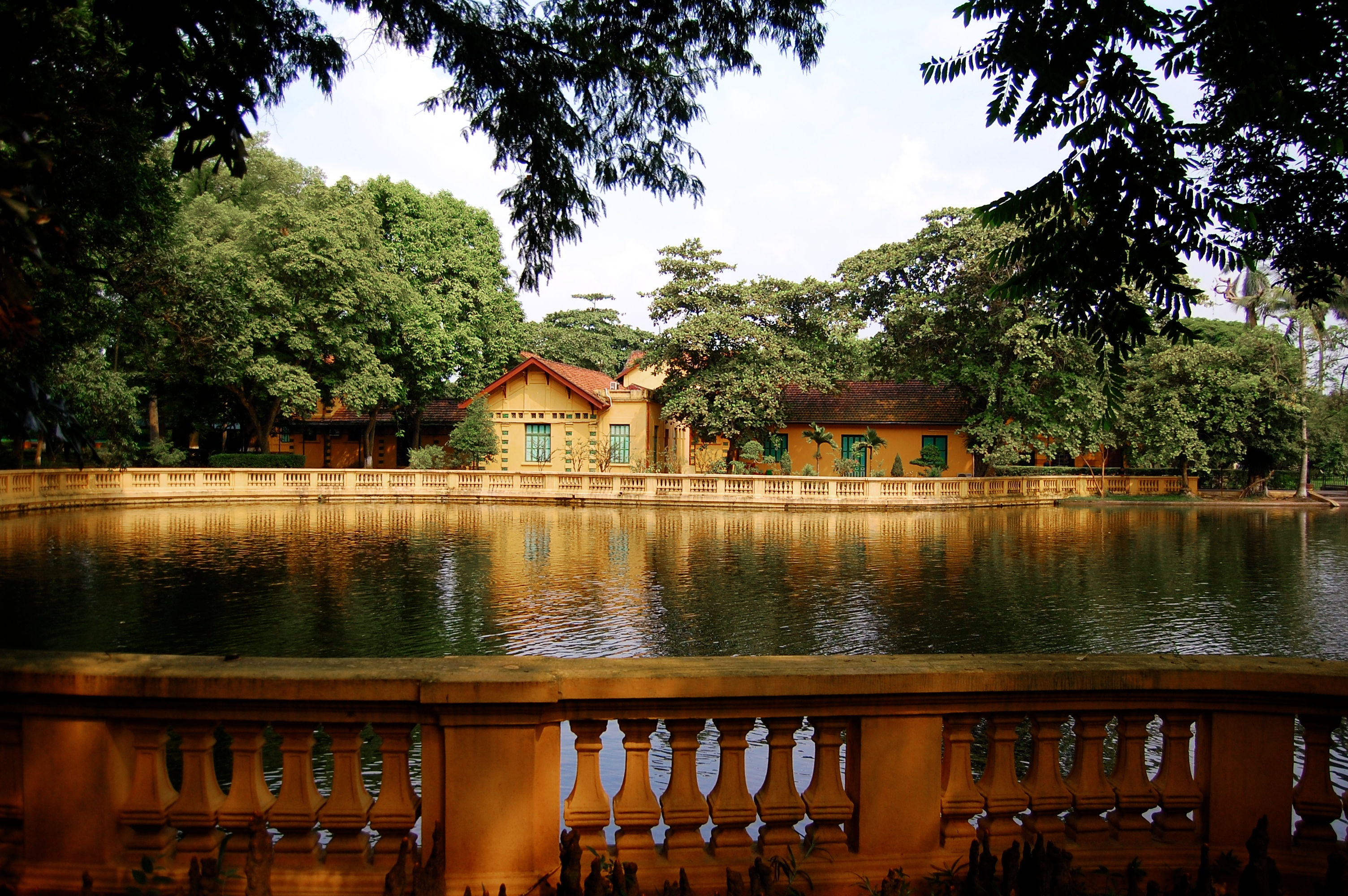
Carp pond on the grounds of the palace

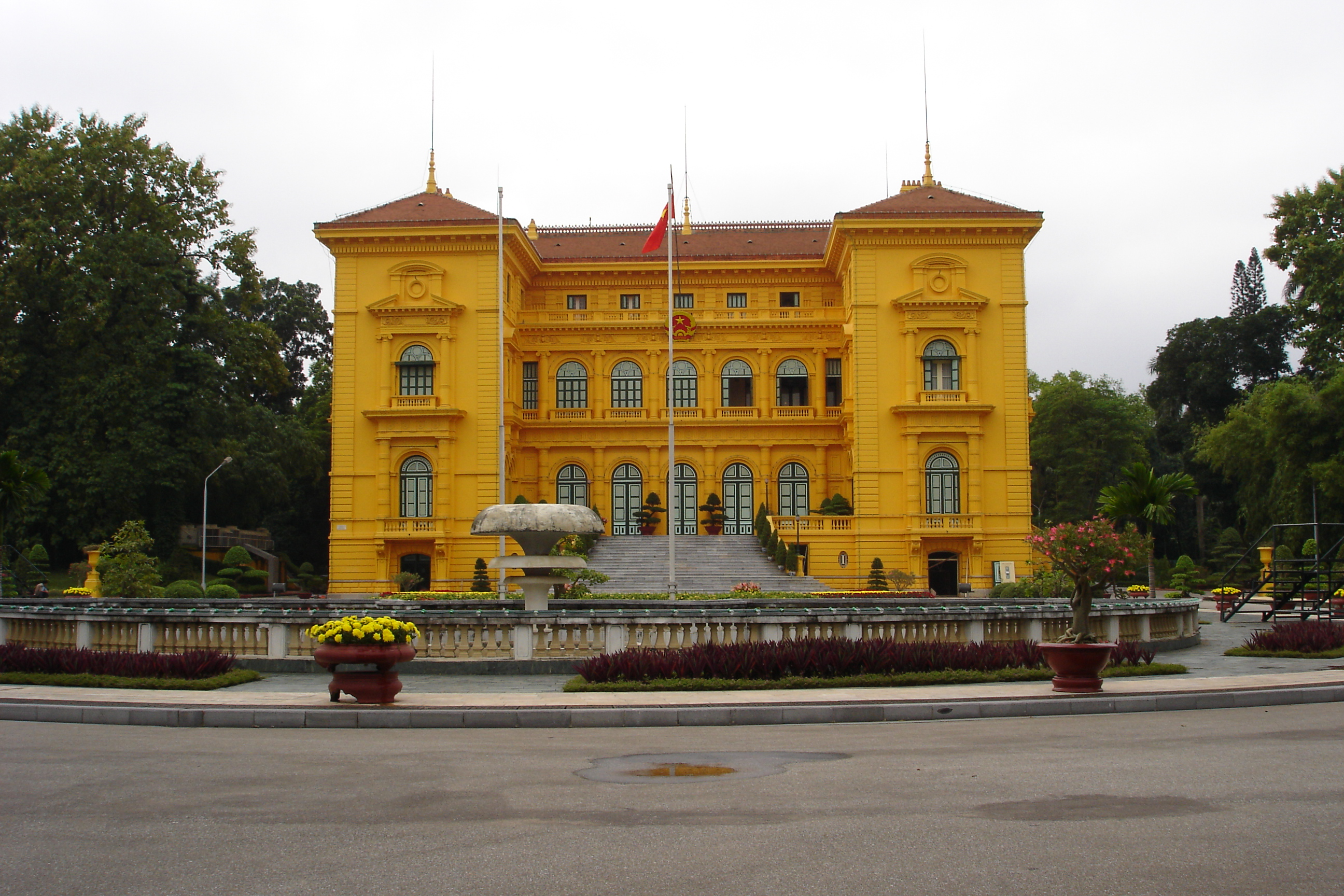
Presidential Palace

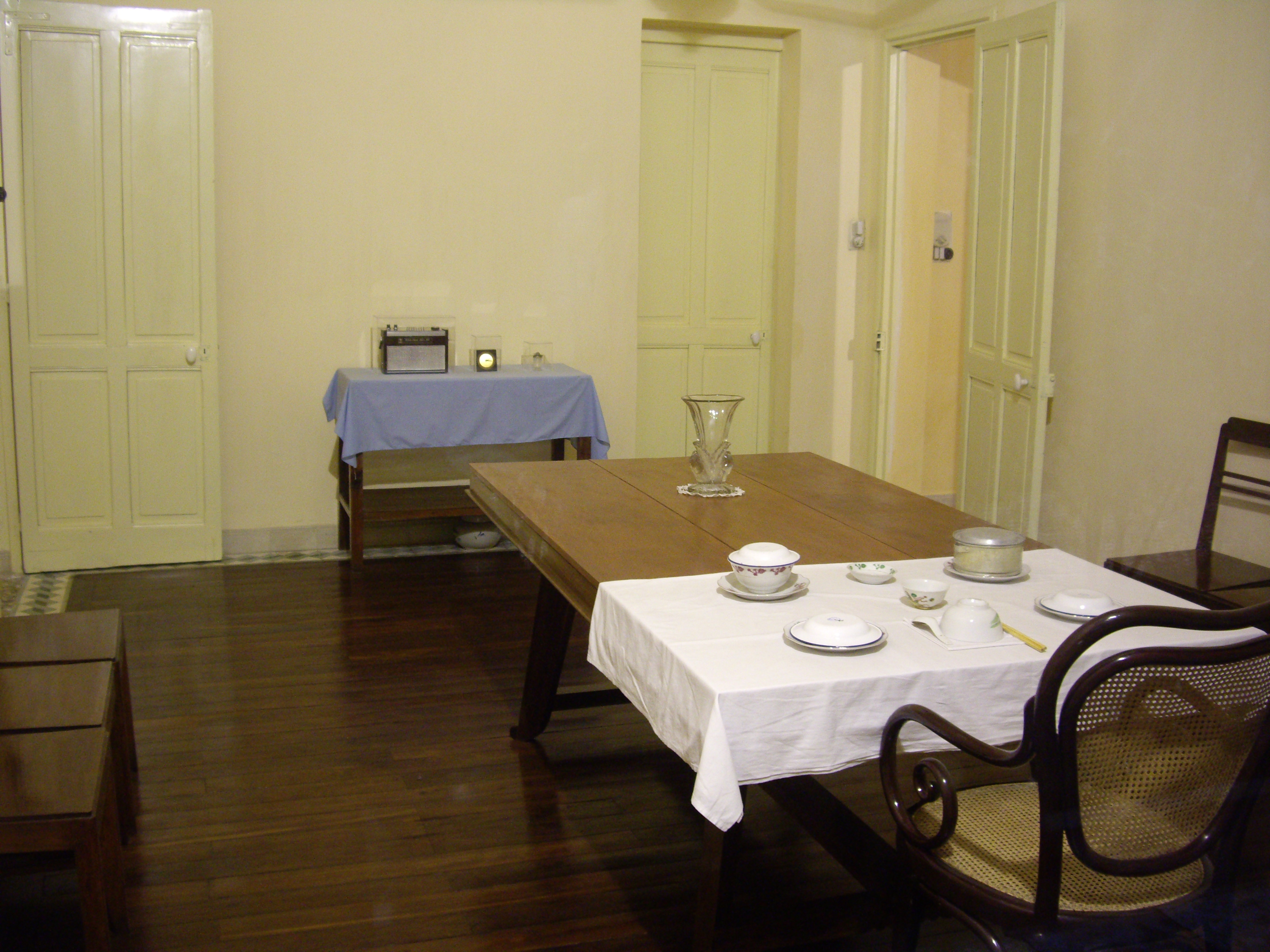
Dining room of Ho Chi Minh's house attached to the Presidential Palace

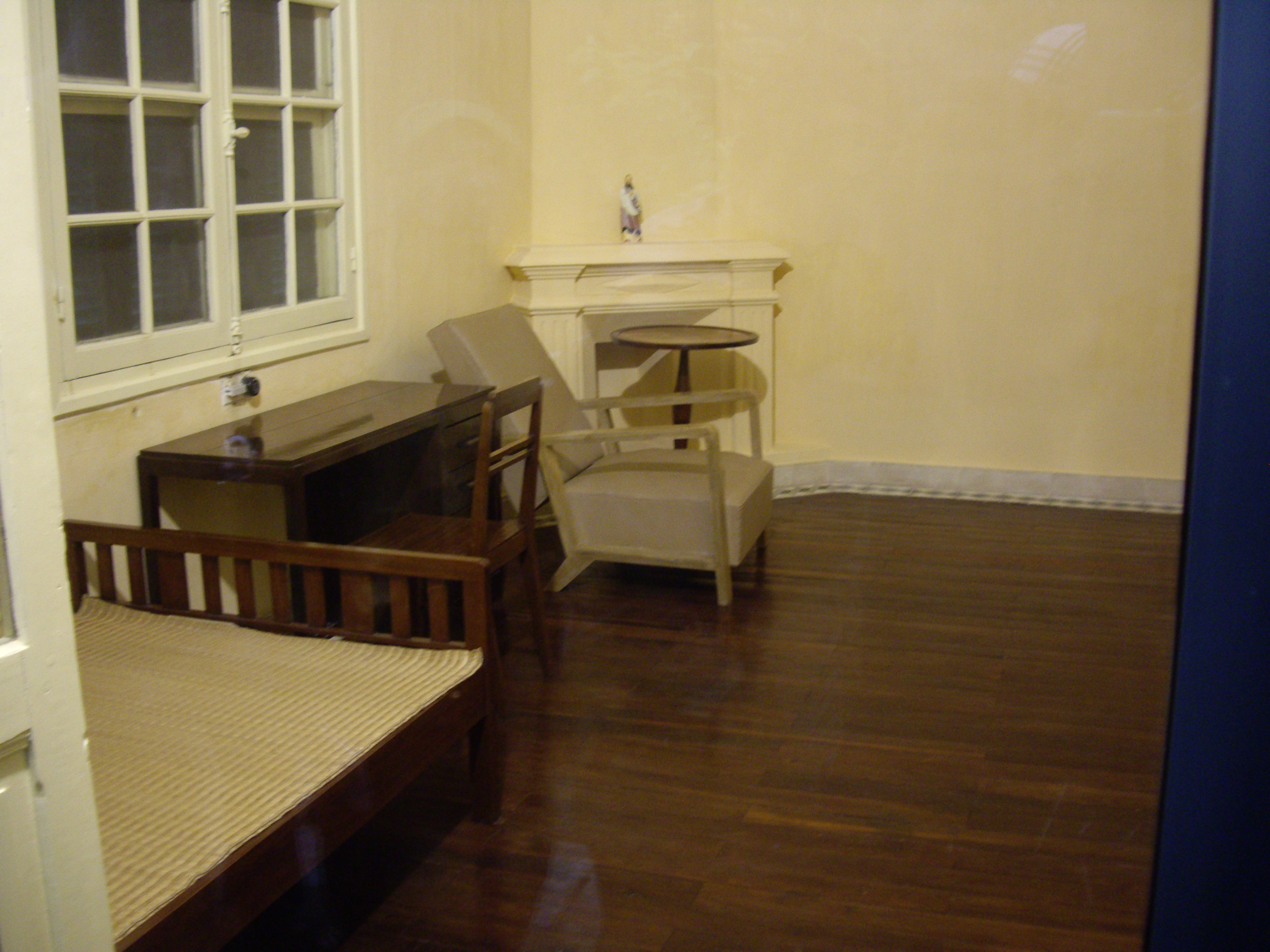
Bedroom of Ho Chi Minh's house attached to the Presidential Palace

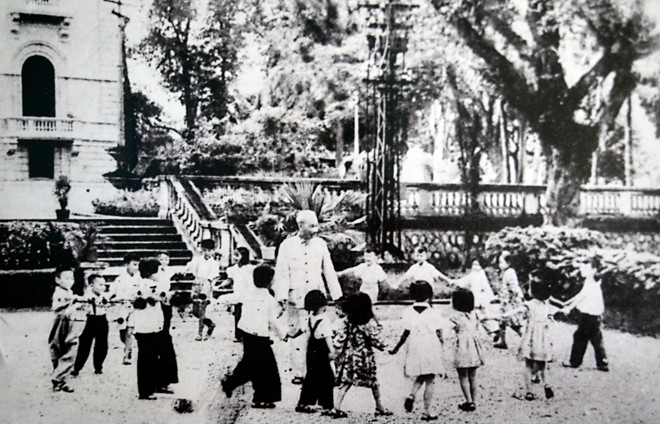
President Ho Chi Minh with children

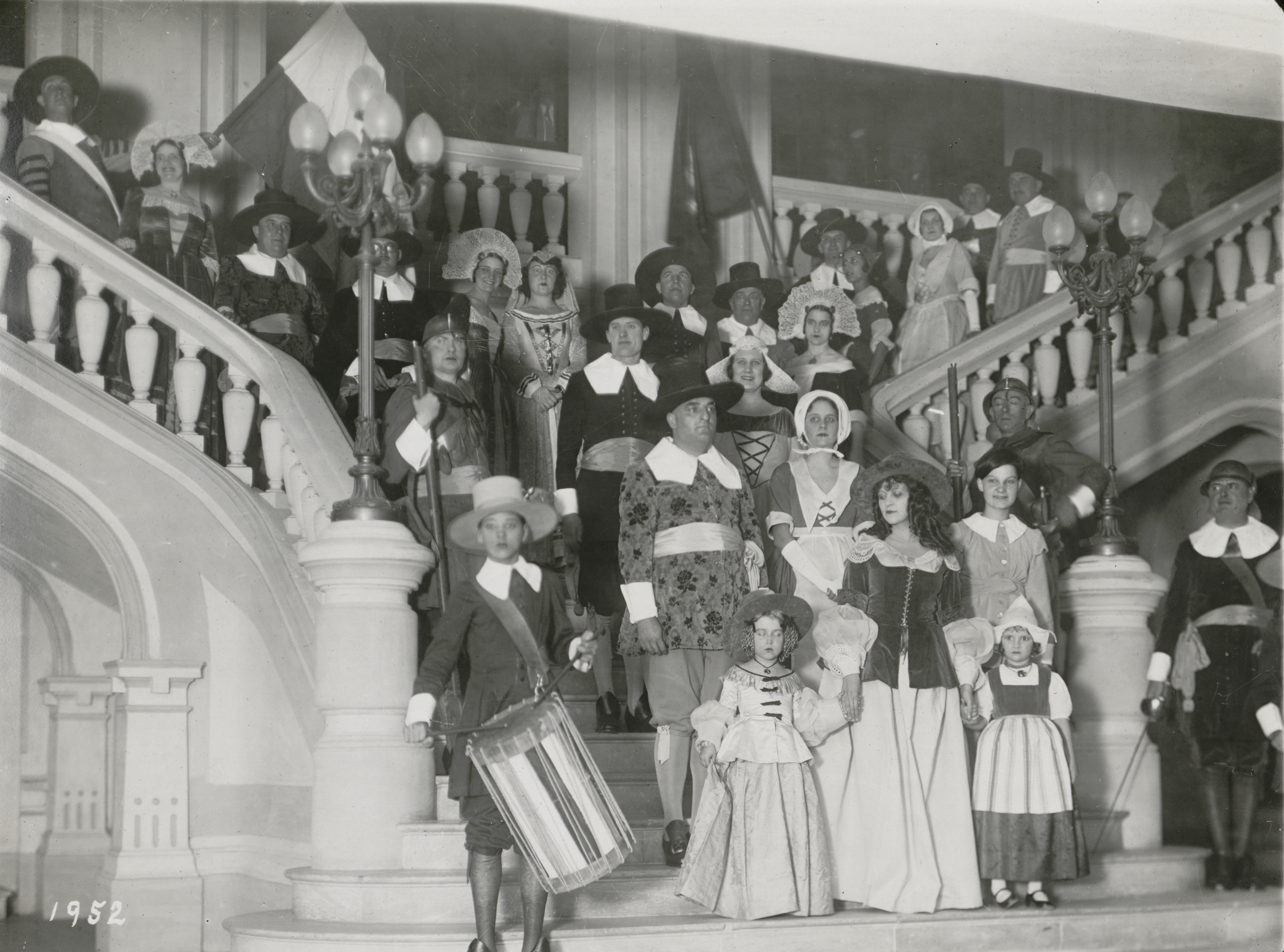
Festival in the Governor's palace in 1930

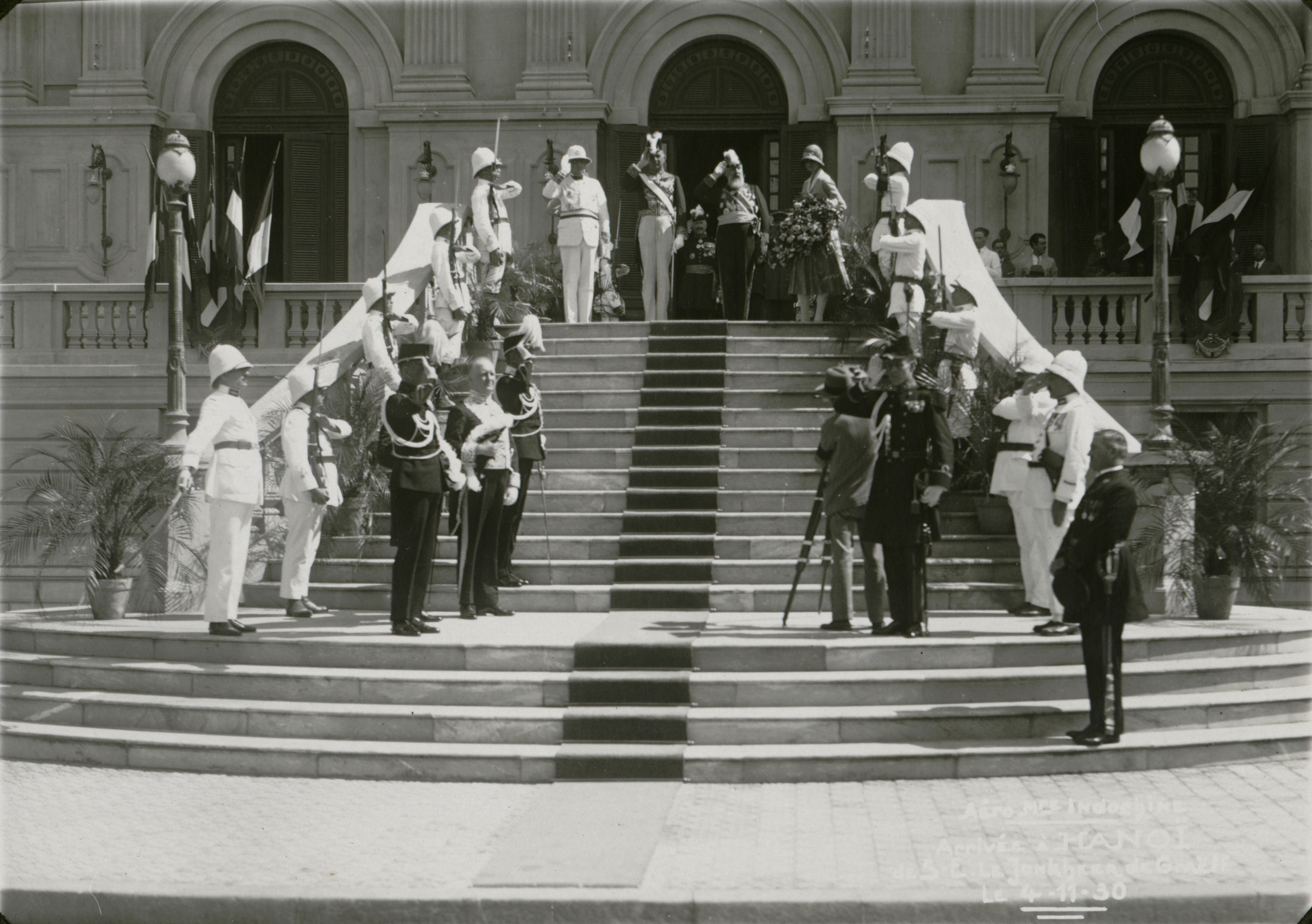
Welcome ceremony for Governor-General of the Dutch East Indies Andries Cornelis Dirk de Graeff.

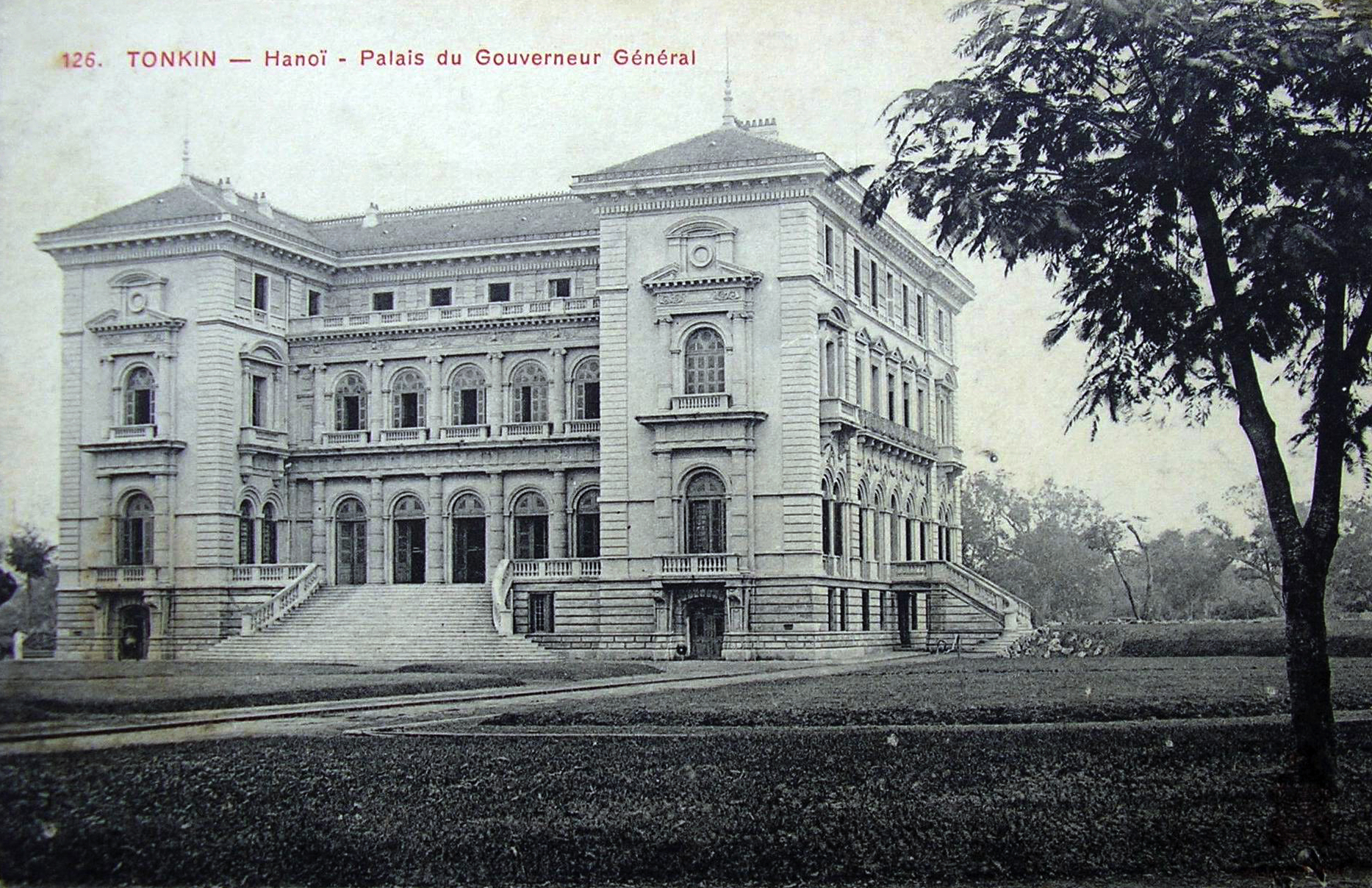
Residence of the governor-general of French Indochina in Hanoi, Tonkin

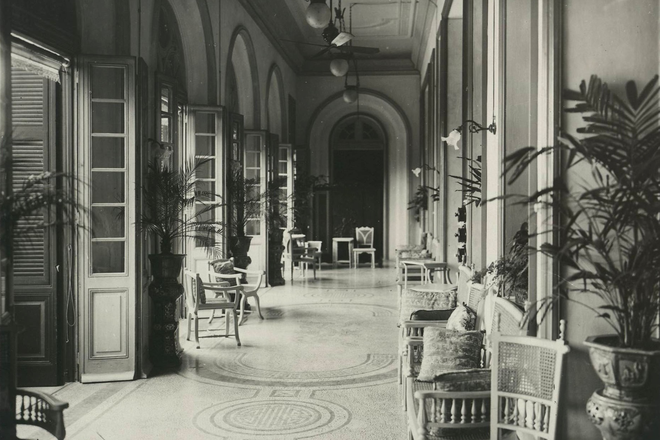
Inside the building, undated

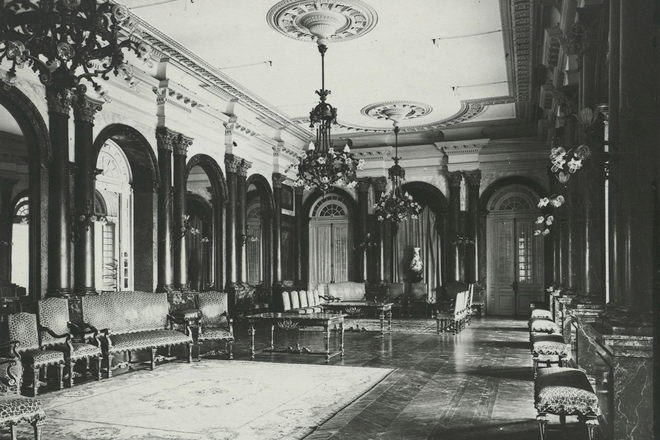
Interior of the building, undated

== See also ==
- Tonkin Palace in Hoàn Kiếm District built between 1915 and 1916 to house the governor of Tonkin
