= Tonkin Palace =

- Bắc Bộ Phủ (Vietnamese)
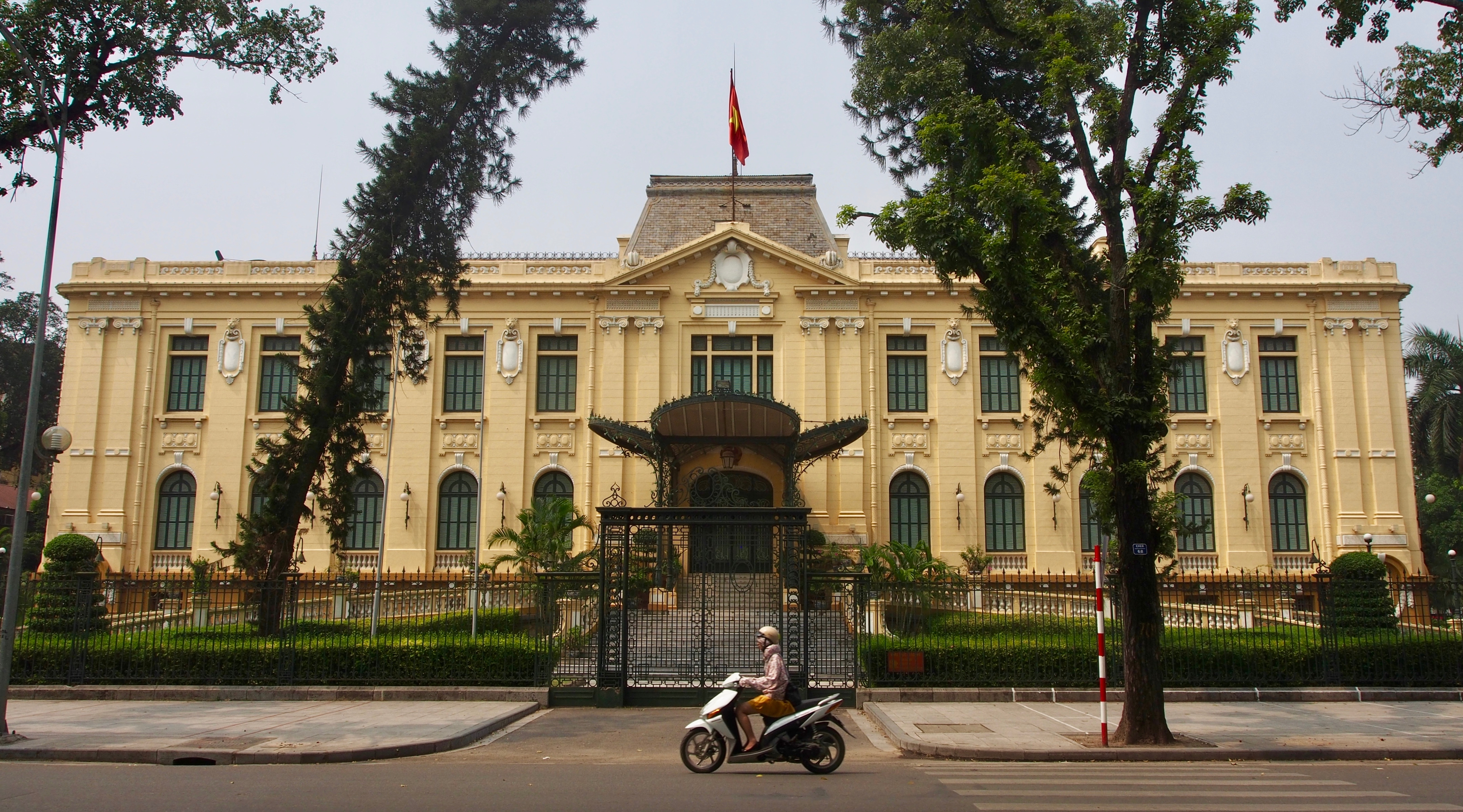
- Tonkin Palace functions as the State Guest House and Office of President of Vietnam

- Location within Vietnam
- 21.0266°N 105.8553°E
- Location: 12 Ngô Quyền street, Tràng Tiền, Hoàn Kiếm District, Hanoi, Vietnam

History
- Built for: French Governor of Tonkin

Site notes
- Area: 15,000 m^{2} (160,000 sq ft) (floor space); 117,000 m^{2} (1,260,000 sq ft) (site)
- Architect: Auguste Henri Vildieu
- Architectural style: French Colonial

Tonkin Palace (Bắc Bộ Phủ), also known as State Guest House (Vietnamese: Nhà khách Chính phủ, French: Maison des hôtes d'État), is a historical monument in Hoàn Kiếm District, Hanoi, Vietnam. It is presently used as a state guest house for foreign affair activities, as well as the operational headquarter for the country's presidential office.

The building is representative of French Colonial architecture in French Indochina. It was formerly the Residential Palace of the Tonkin Governor (French: Le Palais du Résident Supérieur du Tonkin, Vietnamese: Dinh Thống Sứ Bắc Kỳ), built between 1918 and 1919 to house the French Governor of Tonkin. It was later renamed the Tonkin Palace (Vietnamese: Bắc Bộ Phủ) when the Viet Minh took over northern Vietnam.

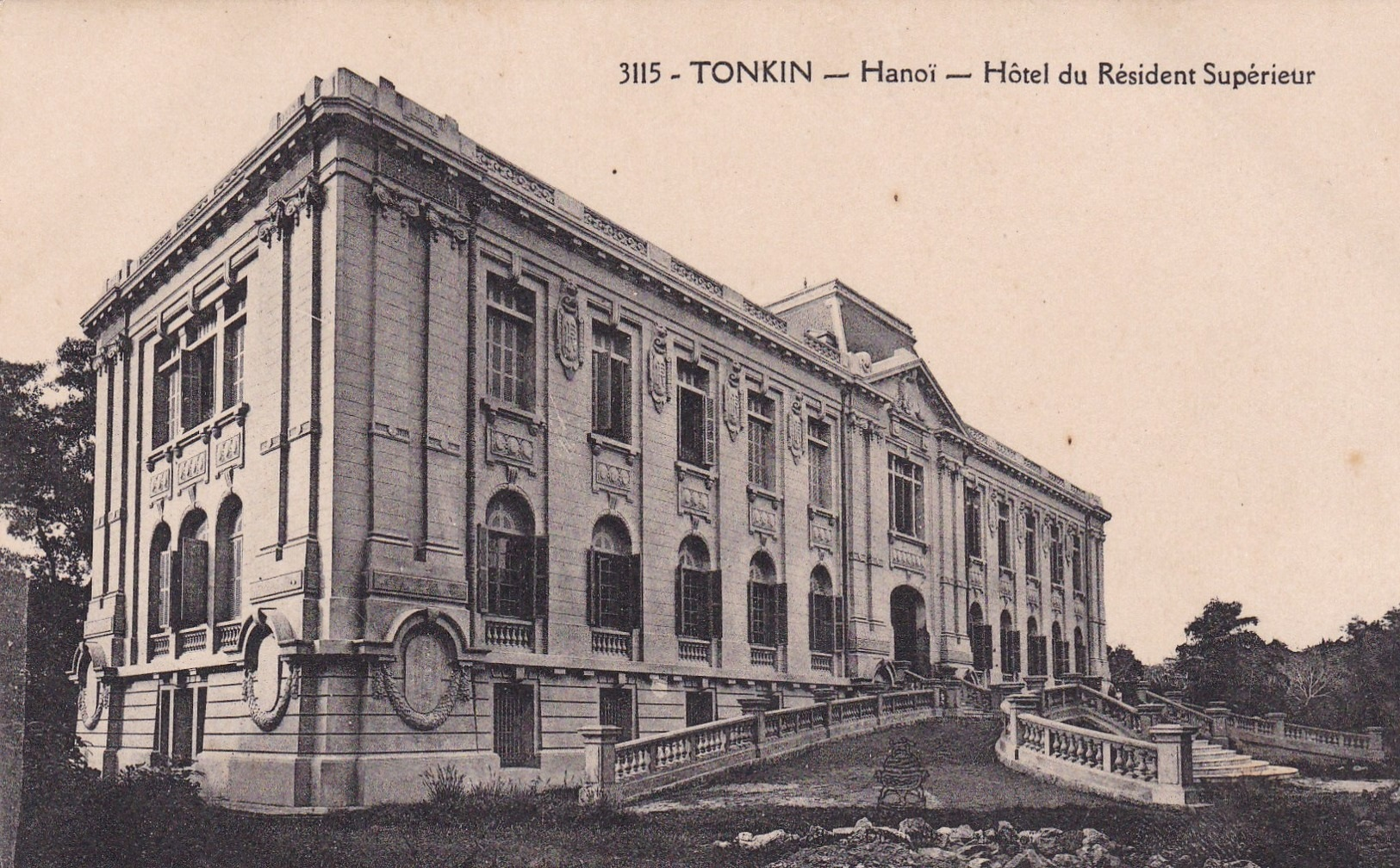
Residence of the Governor of Tonkin

== History ==
The palace was built by Auguste Henri Vildieu between 1918 and 1919 to house the French Governor of Tonkin.

The building was the location of Viet Minh's takeover of northern Vietnam, following the August Revolution in 1945.

On December 20, 1946, the French Army battled to capture Tonkin Palace from Viet Minh. The fighting was intense and marked the early stage of the First Indochina War. After six attacks, 122 casualties, and the destruction of four tanks, the French Army occupied the palace.

After the partition of Vietnam, it became the state guest house of North Vietnam, while South Vietnam had the state guest house at Nguyễn Du Street, Nhà khách 108 Nguyễn Du, and close to the Independence Palace.

In modern times, even though the building is designated as the State Guest House of the Vietnamese Government but it is mostly used for usual press briefings and formal meetings by Ministry of Foreign Affairs, while Hung Vuong Hotel serves as de facto state guest house under management of Office of Vietnamese Government.

After a major restoration and upgrading in 2025, the site has been designated as a headquarter of Office of the President of Vietnam along with two new office buildings having identical architectural style as Tonkin Palace, while the Presidential Palace remains for state ceremonial activities.

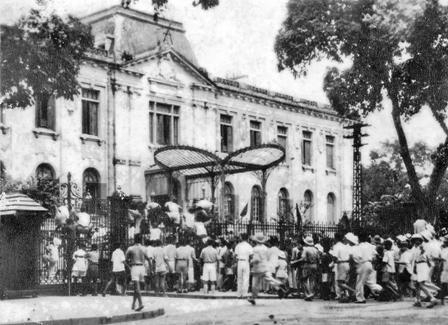
Viet Minh-aligned people overran the building in 1945, being the symbollic image representing the August Revolution.

== Gallery ==
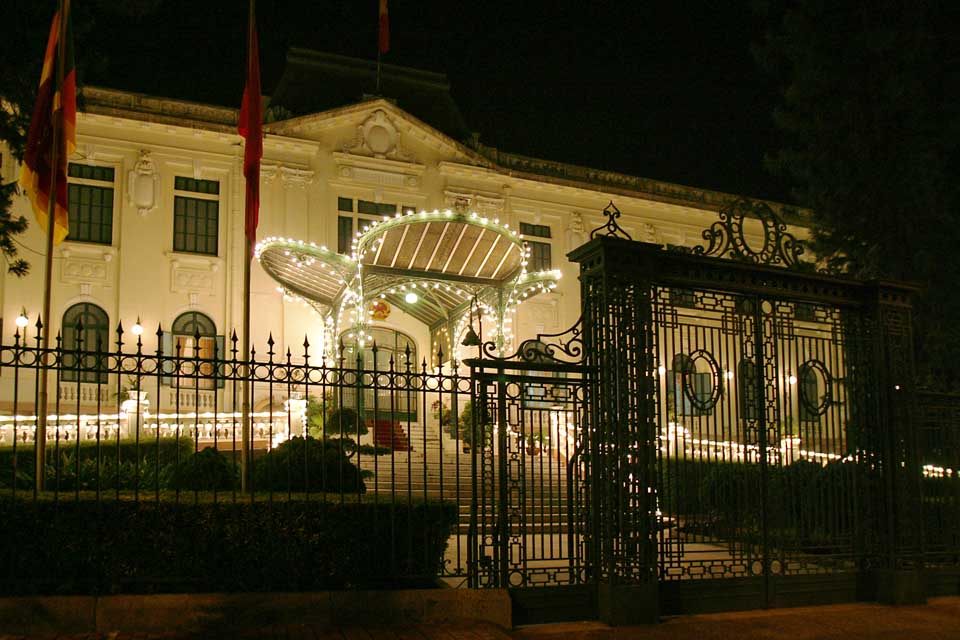
Tonkin Palace at night

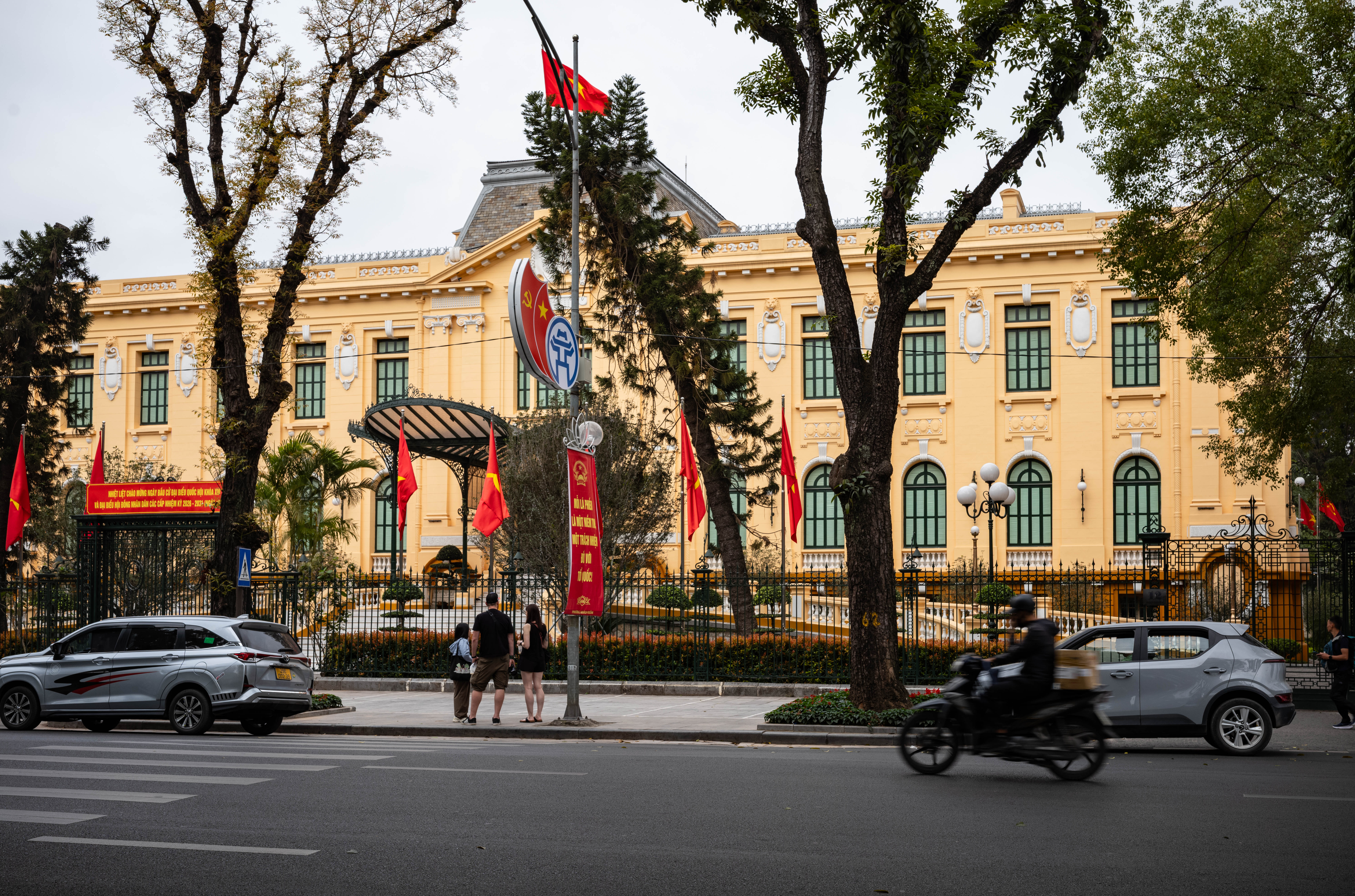
The building, as seen in early 2026.

== See also ==
- Presidential Palace in Ba Đình District, built between 1900 and 1906 to house the French Governor-General of Indochina
