= Auguste Henri Vildieu =

French architect

Auguste Henri Vildieu was the French architectural adjutant in Hanoi while that city was an administrative center for the French colony of Indochina. Vildieu constructed several grand European-style buildings for the colonial government, including:

- the Bureaux et Résidences Supérieure (including the Tonkin Palace)
- the Mairie (City Hall)
- the Palais de Justice (Supreme Court)
- the post office
- the Presidential Palace 1900-1906 (then known as the Palace of the Governor-General of Indochina)
- the Public Works Building
- the Hỏa Lò Prison

Vildieu may also have been involved with the construction of the local Roman Catholic cathedral. While Vildieu spent most of his working life designing French buildings in Vietnam, he early on designed a Vietnamese building in France for the 1889 Universal Exposition. This pavilion was modeled on the porch of the Pagoda of Quan Yen, and was referred to at the Exposition as the "Palace of Annan and Tonkin".
