= State guest house =

Type of building owned by a country's government

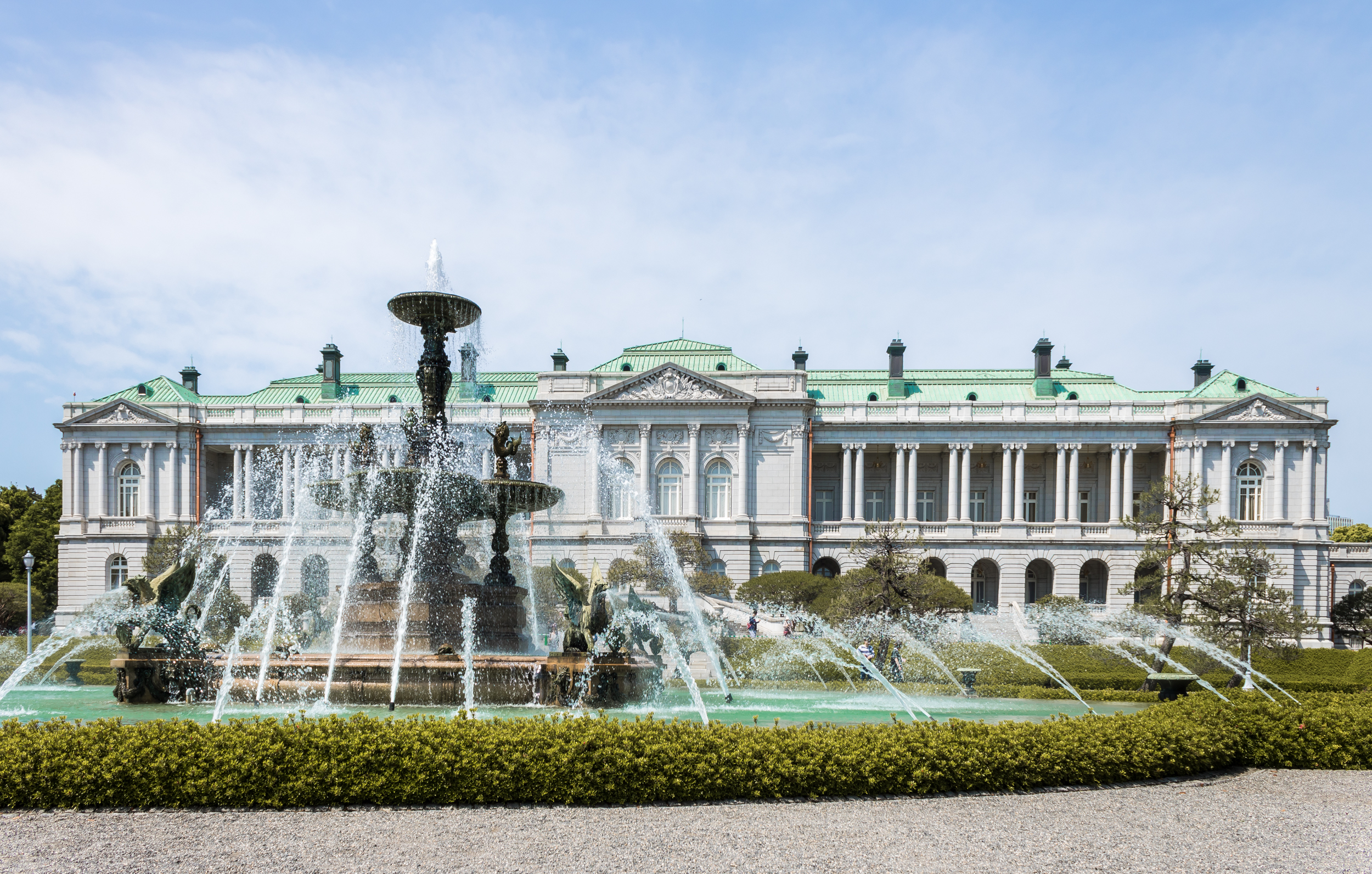
Akasaka Palace in Tokyo, Japan

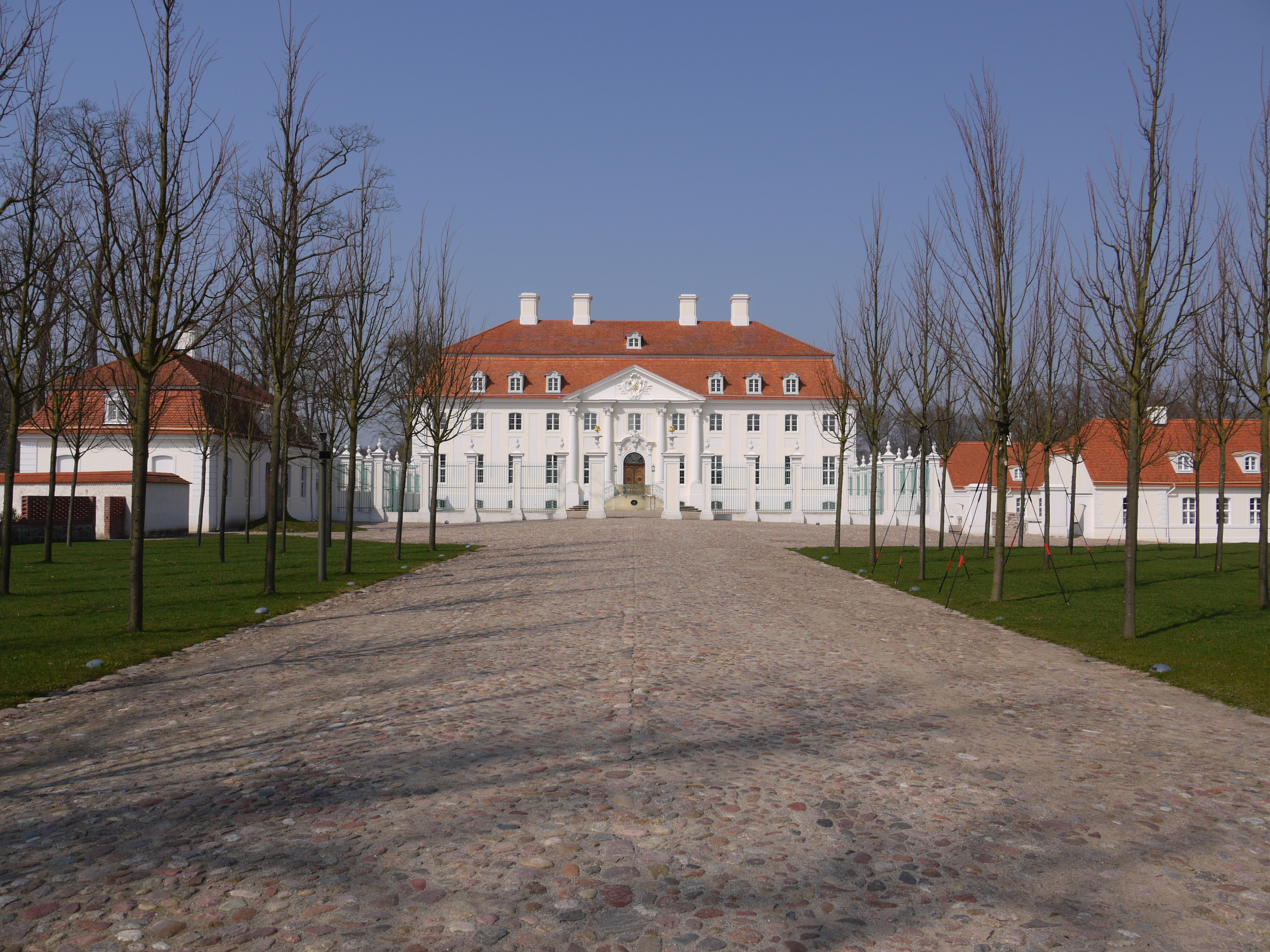
Schloss Meseberg outside Berlin, Germany

A state guest house is a building owned by the government of a country which is used as an official residence for visiting foreign dignitaries, especially during state visits or for other important events.

== Africa ==
=== Morocco ===
- Mendoub's Residence in Tangier

== Americas ==
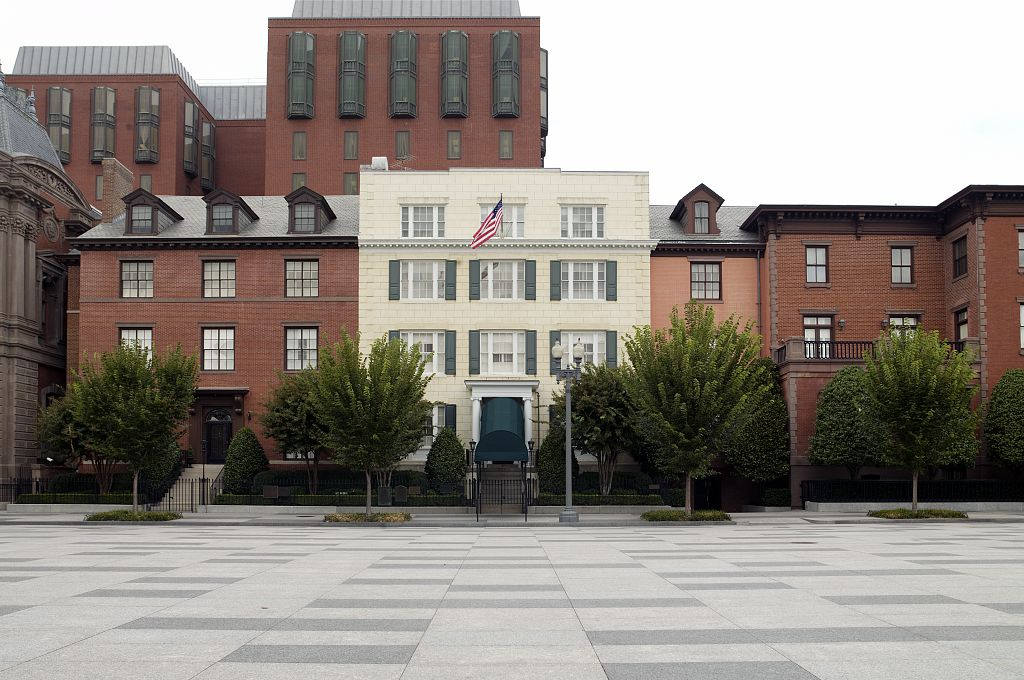
Blair House in Washington, D.C., USA

=== Canada ===
- 7 Rideau Gate in Ottawa

=== United States ===
- Blair House (President's Guest House) in Washington, D.C.

== Asia ==
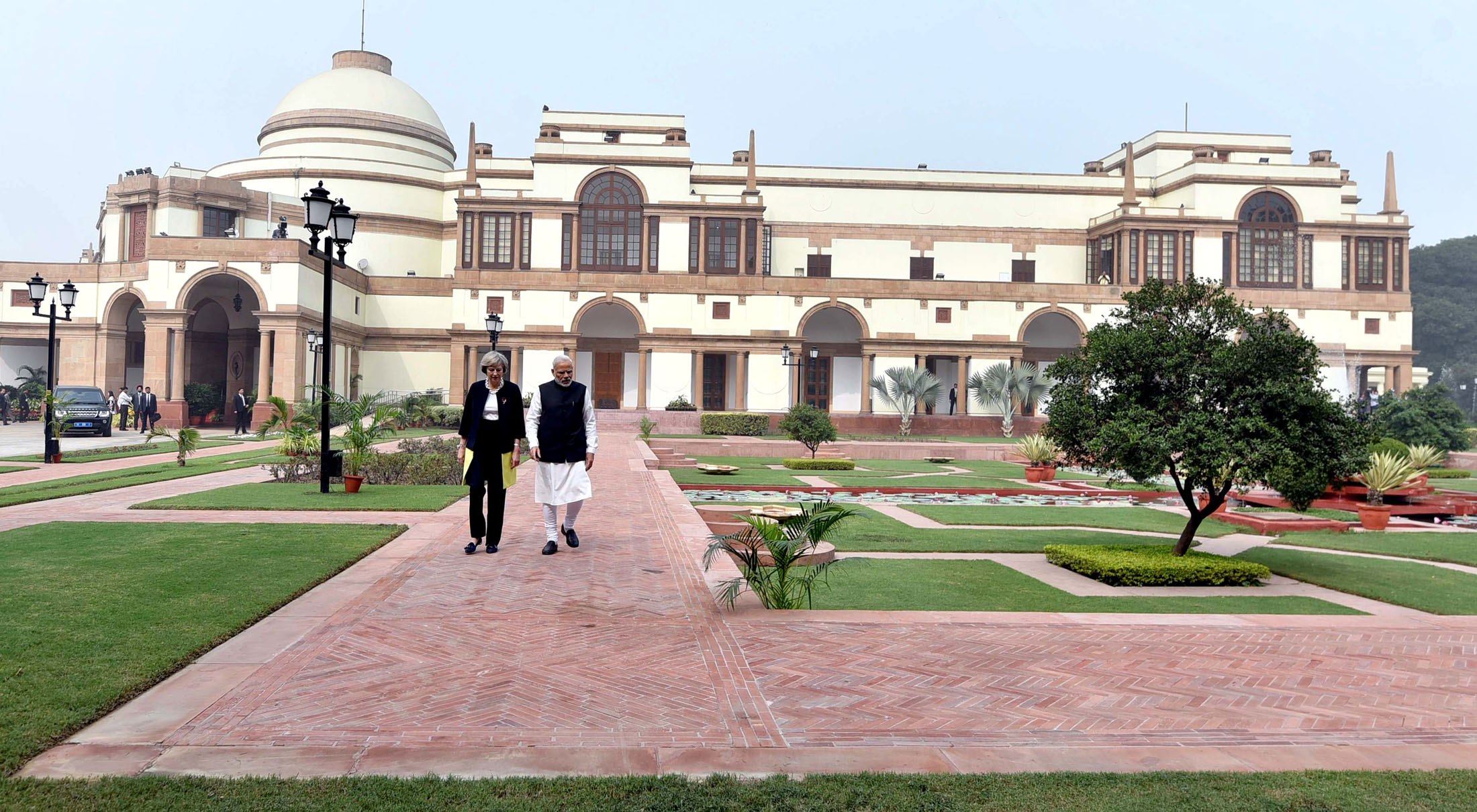
Hyderabad House in New Delhi, India

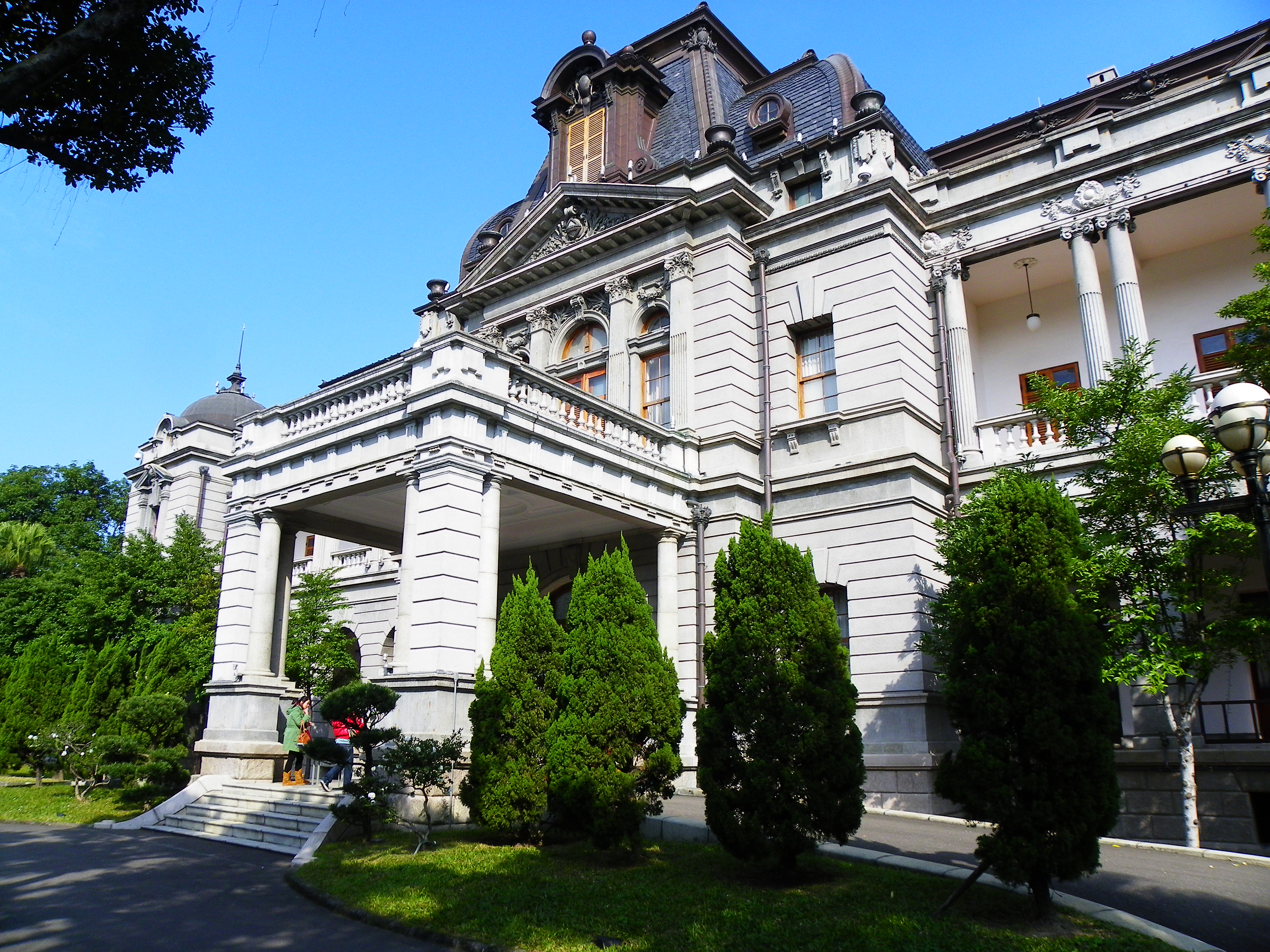
Taipei Guest House in Taiwan

=== Bangladesh ===
- Jamuna State Guest House
- Meghna State Guest House
- Padma State Guest House
- Sugandha State Guest House

=== China ===
- Diaoyutai State Guesthouse in Beijing

=== India ===
- Hyderabad House

=== Iraq ===
- White Palace in Baghdad

=== Indonesia ===
- Merdeka Palace
- State Palace

=== Japan ===
- Akasaka Palace in Tokyo
- Kyoto State Guest House in Kyoto

=== North Korea ===
- Paekhwawon State Guest House

=== Sri Lanka ===
- Visumpaya

=== Taiwan ===
- Taipei Guest House

=== Turkey ===
- Ankara Palas
- Presidential State Guesthouse in Marmaris

=== Vietnam ===
- State Guest House in Hanoi

== Europe ==
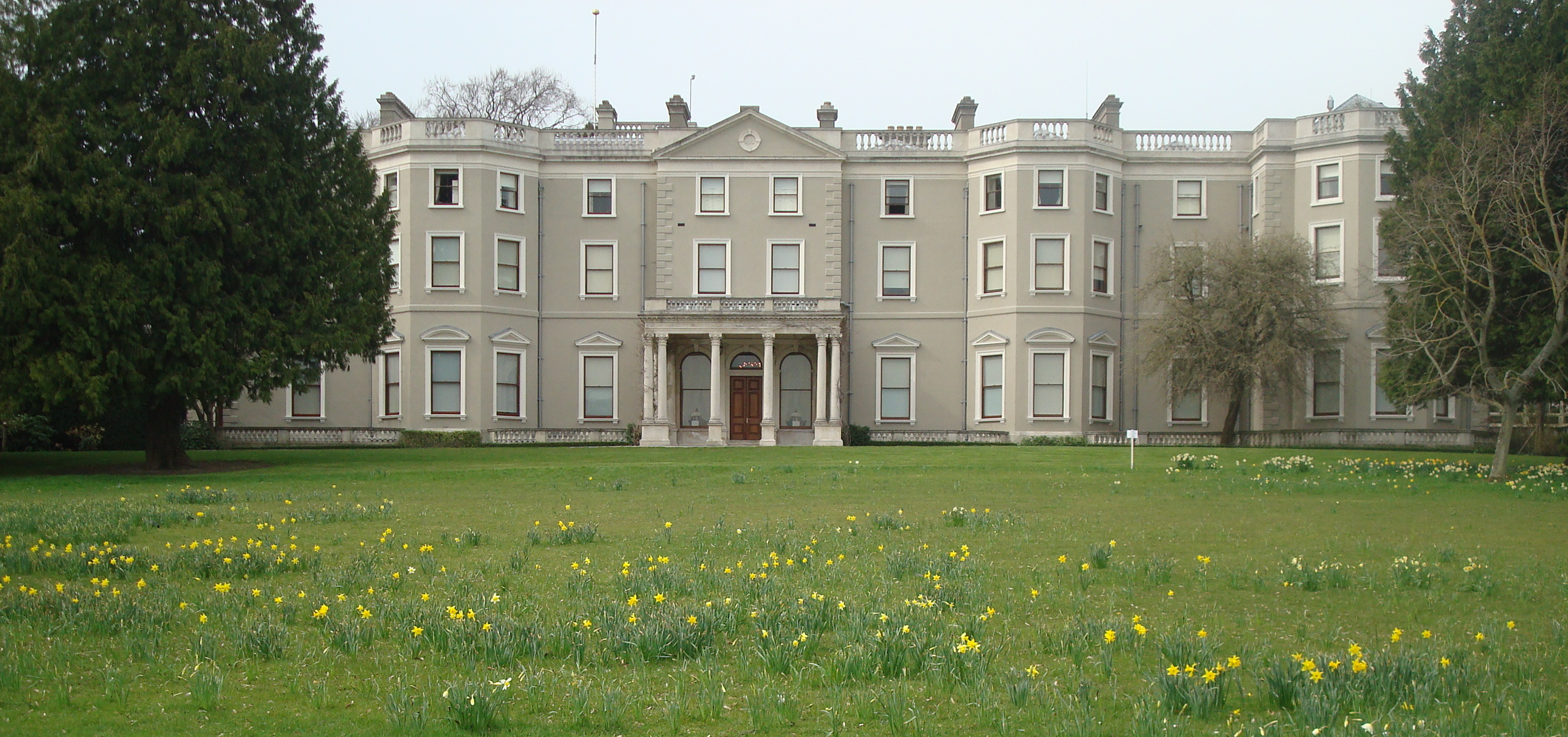
Farmleigh in Dublin, Ireland.

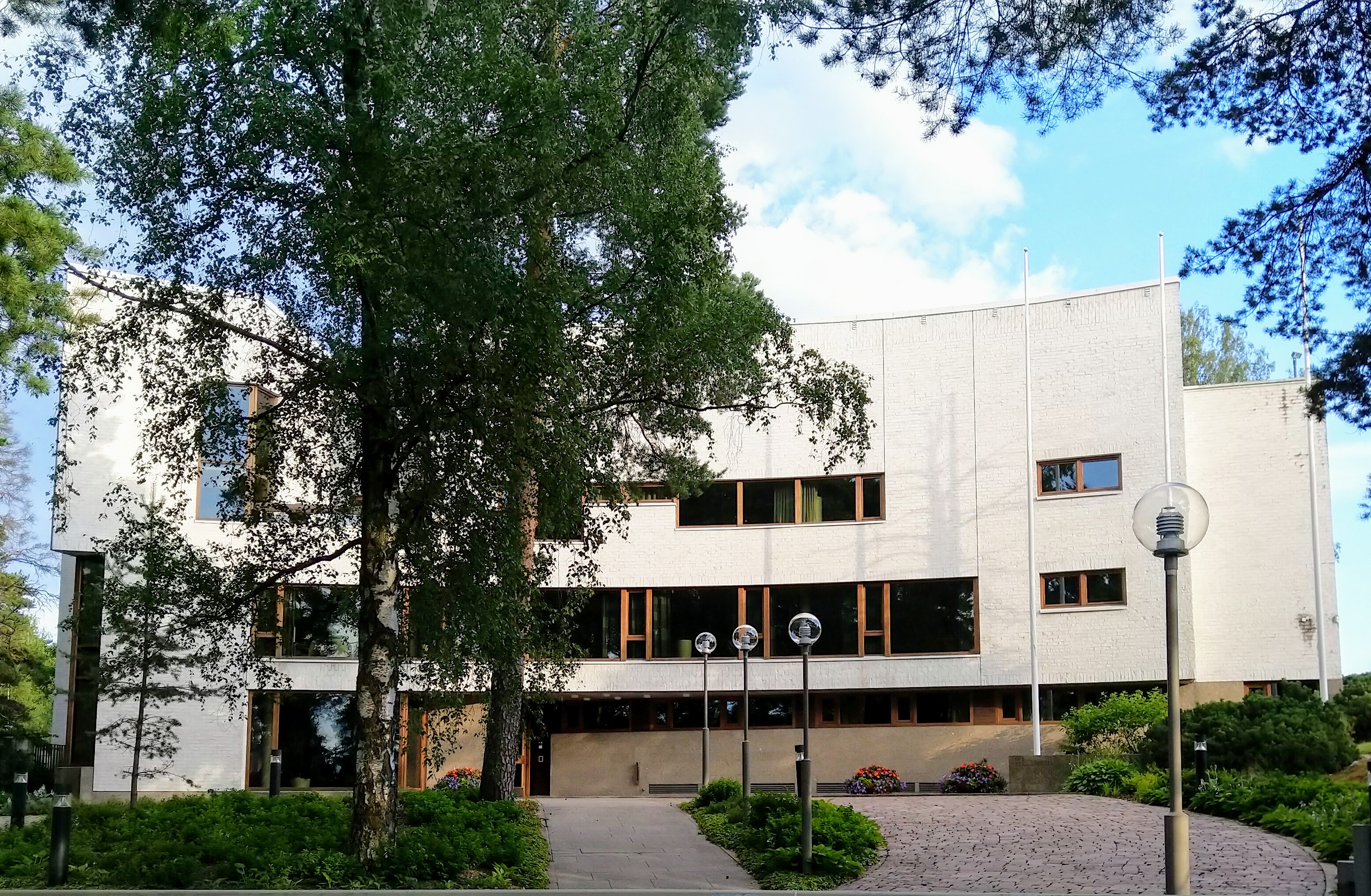
Finnish State Guesthouse in Helsinki, Finland.

Queluz Palace outside Lisbon, Portugal.

=== Ireland ===
- Farmleigh in Dublin

=== Finland ===
- Finnish State Guesthouse in Munkkiniemi, Helsinki
- Königstedt Manor just outside Helsinki

=== France ===
- Hôtel de Marigny in Paris

=== Germany ===
- Hotel Petersberg outside Bonn
- Schloss Meseberg outside Berlin

=== Italy ===
- Villa Madama

=== Poland ===
- Belweder

=== Portugal ===
- Queluz Palace outside Lisbon

=== Spain ===
- El Pardo Palace outside Madrid

=== Switzerland ===
- Hotel Bellevue Palace

=== Vatican ===
- Domus Sanctae Marthae
