= State Guest House Jamuna =

Bangladesh government guest house

- রাষ্ট্রীয় অতিথি ভবন যমুনা
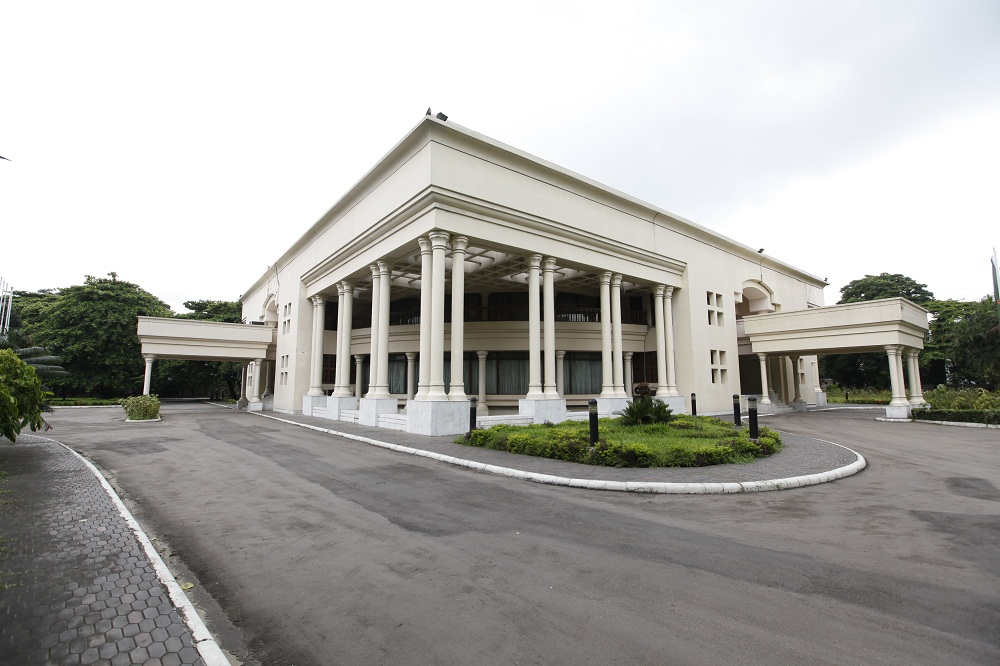
- Interactive map of the State Guest House Jamuna area

General information
- Location: 30 Hare Road, Dhaka, Bangladesh
- Coordinates: 23°44′30″N 90°24′00″E
- Completed: 1985
- Cost: ৳15,000,000 taka
- Client: Government of Bangladesh
- Owner: Government of Bangladesh
- Operator: Public Works Department

Technical details
- Floor count: 2
- Floor area: 42,125.02 sq ft (3,913.542 m^{2})

The State Guest House Jamuna (Bengali: রাষ্ট্রীয় অতিথি ভবন যমুনা, romanized: rāṣṭrīẏa atithi bhabana yamunā) is an official guest house of the Government of Bangladesh located in Ramna Thana, Dhaka. It is used to host visiting heads of state and also served as the temporary residence of the Chief Adviser of Bangladesh.

== History ==
Before 1990, it served as the official residence of the Vice President of Bangladesh during the presidency of Hussain Muhammad Ershad.

In 2009, after Prime Minister Sheikh Hasina was elected, she moved to Jamuna State Guest House as the residence officially allotted to her as part of a security law for family members of Sheikh Mujibur Rahman, the Ganabhaban, was being renovated. She moved from her private residence to the guest house on the advice of intelligence agencies who were concerned over her security.

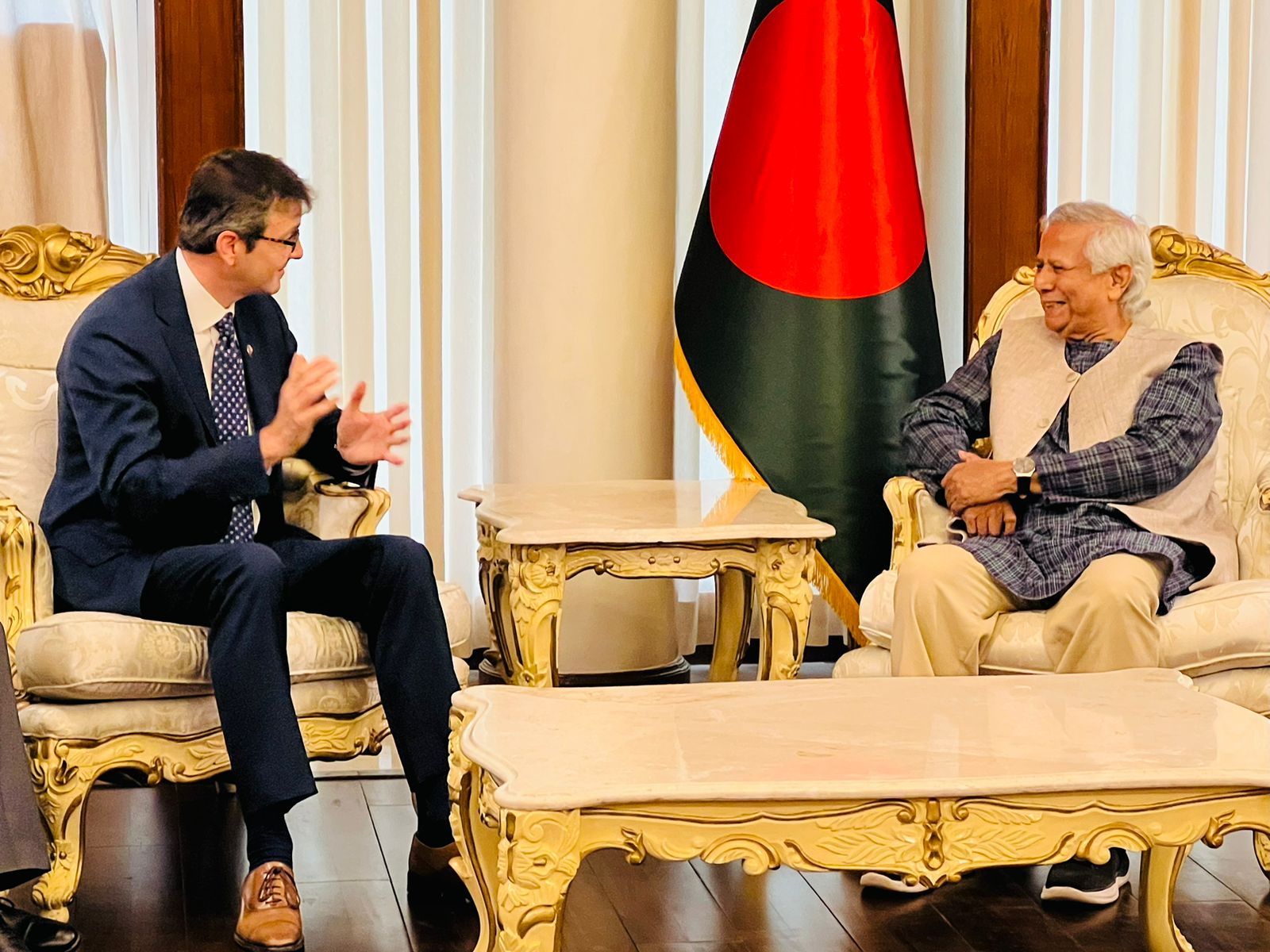
A view from inside the house during an official meeting in 2024

Following the resignation of Sheikh Hasina during July Uprising on 5 August 2024, the Jamuna State Guest House became the official residence of Muhammad Yunus after he was appointed as the chief adviser of the interim government.

== See also ==
- Meghna State Guest House
