= Bangladesh–Sweden relations =

- Bangladesh: Sweden

Bangladesh and Sweden have had diplomatic relations with each other since 1972, a year after the former declared independence. Sweden was among the first countries to recognize Bangladesh. Bangladesh maintains an embassy in the Swedish capital Stockholm and Sweden likewise maintains an embassy in the Bangladeshi capital Dhaka.

== History ==
Bangladesh declared its independence in 1971 and Sweden, with its recognition on 4 February 1972, was one of the first countries to recognize the newly formed country. In a telegram to Bangladeshi foreign minister Abdus Samad Azad, Swedish foreign minister Krister Wickman expressed his government's wishes for Bangladesh's success and emphasized that the Swedish government wished to establish diplomatic relations with the new state.

=== High-level visits ===
Swedish deputy prime minister Isabella Lövin visited Bangladesh in November 2014. On 15–16 June 2017, Bangladeshi prime minister Sheikh Hasina visited Sweden and met with Swedish prime minister Stefan Löfven, development cooperation minister Isabella Lövin, and trade minister Ann Linde. In November 2017, Swedish foreign minister Margot Wallström visited Dhaka and Rohingya refugee camps in Cox's Bazar.

== Embassies ==
Bangladesh maintains an embassy in the Swedish capital Stockholm. As of 2025, the embassy is headed by ambassador Mehdi Hasan, a career diplomat who is also the Bangladeshi ambassador to Norway and Finland.

Sweden maintains an embassy in the Bangladeshi capital Dhaka.

== Trade ==
Sweden's main exports to Bangladesh are machinery and apparatuses, which made up about 40% of exports in 2021. Other exports include chemicals, crude materials, iron and steel, mineral fuels, and paper. Swedish exports to Bangladesh peaked in 2007 at 2.073 million Swedish krona, largely due to Bangladesh's upscaling of its telecommunications infrastructure and consequent purchase of equipment from Sweden.

Swedish imports from Bangladesh represent only 0.3% of Sweden's total imports but are steadily growing. The Swedish government underestimates the amount of imports from Bangladesh because Bangladeshi products intended for the Swedish market are often off-loaded in other countries in the European Union.
