= Meghna State Guest House =

Officials state guest house of Bangladesh

State Guest House Meghna
- রাষ্ট্রীয় অতিথি ভবন মেঘনা
- Interactive map of the State Guest House Meghna area

General information
- Status: State guest house
- Location: PCW3+7CJ, Shaheed Captain Monsur Ali Sharani, Dhaka 1217, Dhaka, Bangladesh
- Coordinates: 23°44′43″N 90°24′11″E
- Completed: 1962
- Cost: 2 million Bangladeshi takas
- Client: Government of Bangladesh
- Owner: Government of Bangladesh
- Management: City PWD Division, Dhaka

Technical details
- Floor count: 2
- Floor area: 18601.91 sq ft

Meghna State Guest House, officially State Guest House Meghna (Bengali: রাষ্ট্রীয় অতিথি ভবন মেঘনা) is a state guest house of Bangladesh for visiting dignitaries and holding official meetings. It is located in Ramna Thana, Dhaka.

== History ==
In 2016 the EU Parliament International Trade Committee Chairman Bernd Lange led a delegation of the EU parliament and met with the commerce minister of Bangladesh, Tofail Ahmed, in the guest house.

== See also ==
- Jamuna State Guest House
