= Bangladesh–Luxembourg relations =

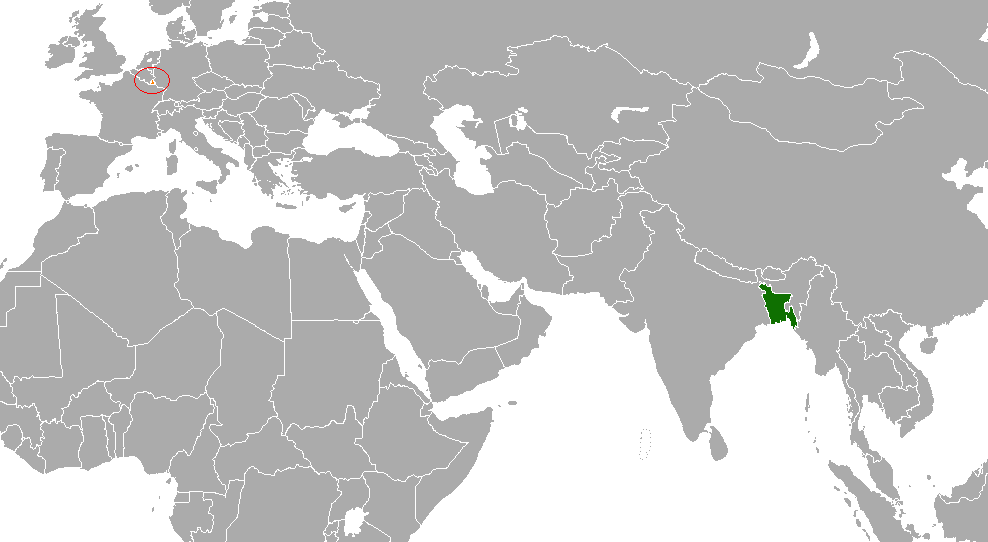

- Bangladesh: Luxembourg

Bangladesh–Luxembourg relations refer to the bilateral relations between Bangladesh and Luxembourg. Luxembourg recognized Bangladesh on February 11, 1972. Bangladesh is accredited to Luxembourg from its embassy in Brussels, Belgium, while Luxembourg is accredited to Bangladesh from its embassy in New Delhi, India. Both countries are members of the United Nations.

== State visits ==
In 2003, the Grand Duchess Maria Teresa of Luxembourg visited Bangladesh, to inaugurate a UNESCO project there. During the visit, the Grand Duchess, along with the Marshal of the Court of Luxembourg Jean Jacques Kasel, and Ambassador of the Netherlands to Bangladesh met with Bangladesh President Iajuddin Ahmed and officials of the Bangladesh Ministry of Foreign Affairs. She also met separately with Foreign Minister Morshed Khan and discussed gender equality, education, microcredit and immunization. She had also visited the country prior to her accent at Grand Duchess, and had met with Bangladeshi Nobel laureate Muhammad Yunus of Grameen Bank.

== Diplomatic missions ==
The Bangladesh Ambassador to Belgium is accredited to Luxembourg.

== Economic cooperation ==
Bangladesh and Luxembourg have shown their interest to expand the bilateral economic activities between the two countries and have been taking necessary steps in this regard. Bangladesh Business Chamber of Commerce in Luxembourg (BBCCL) is an organization for promoting Bangladeshi products in Luxembourg.

One of the main obstacles behind the expansion of trade between the two countries has been the complications of transporting Bangladeshi products to Luxembourg through Germany and Belgium which raises the transportation costs. Experts have emphasized on establishing a hub point of Bangladeshi products in Luxembourg.

The only Undertakings for Collective Investments in Transferable Securities compliant fund for foreign investment in Bangladeshi stocks, SwissPro Invest Bangladesh Fund, is domiciled in Luxembourg.

== Resident diplomatic missions ==
- Bangladesh is accredited to Luxembourg from its embassy in Brussels, Belgium.
- Luxembourg is accredited to Bangladesh from its embassy in New Delhi, India.

== See also ==
- Foreign relations of Bangladesh
- Foreign relations of Luxembourg
