= Bangladesh–Portugal relations =

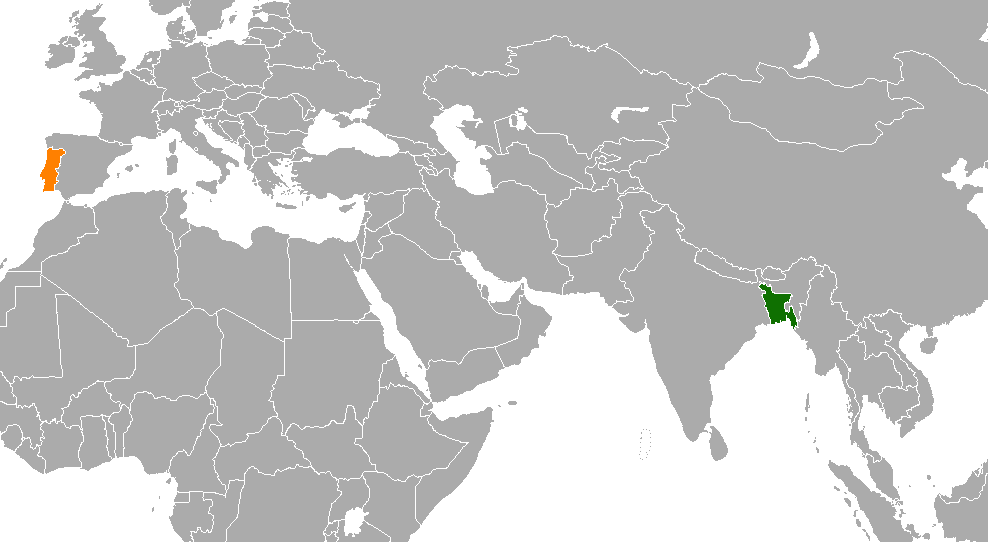

- Bangladesh: Portugal

Bangladesh–Portugal relations refer to the bilateral relations between Bangladesh and Portugal. Bangladesh opened an embassy in Lisbon in 2012 and appointed its first ambassador to Portugal the following year. Portugal has a non-resident ambassador in New Delhi, India.

== History ==
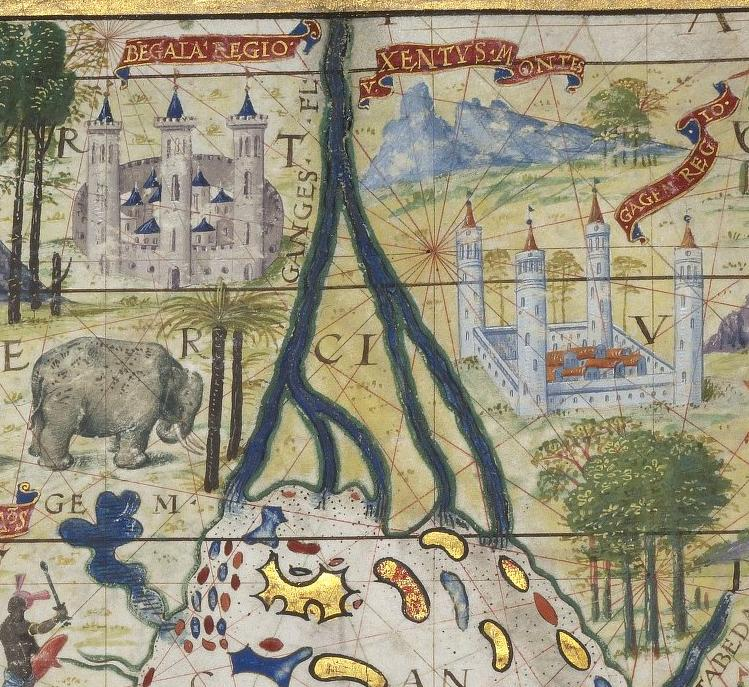
The Bengal Sultanate, shown as the Ganges Delta, in the Portuguese Miller Atlas map from 1519

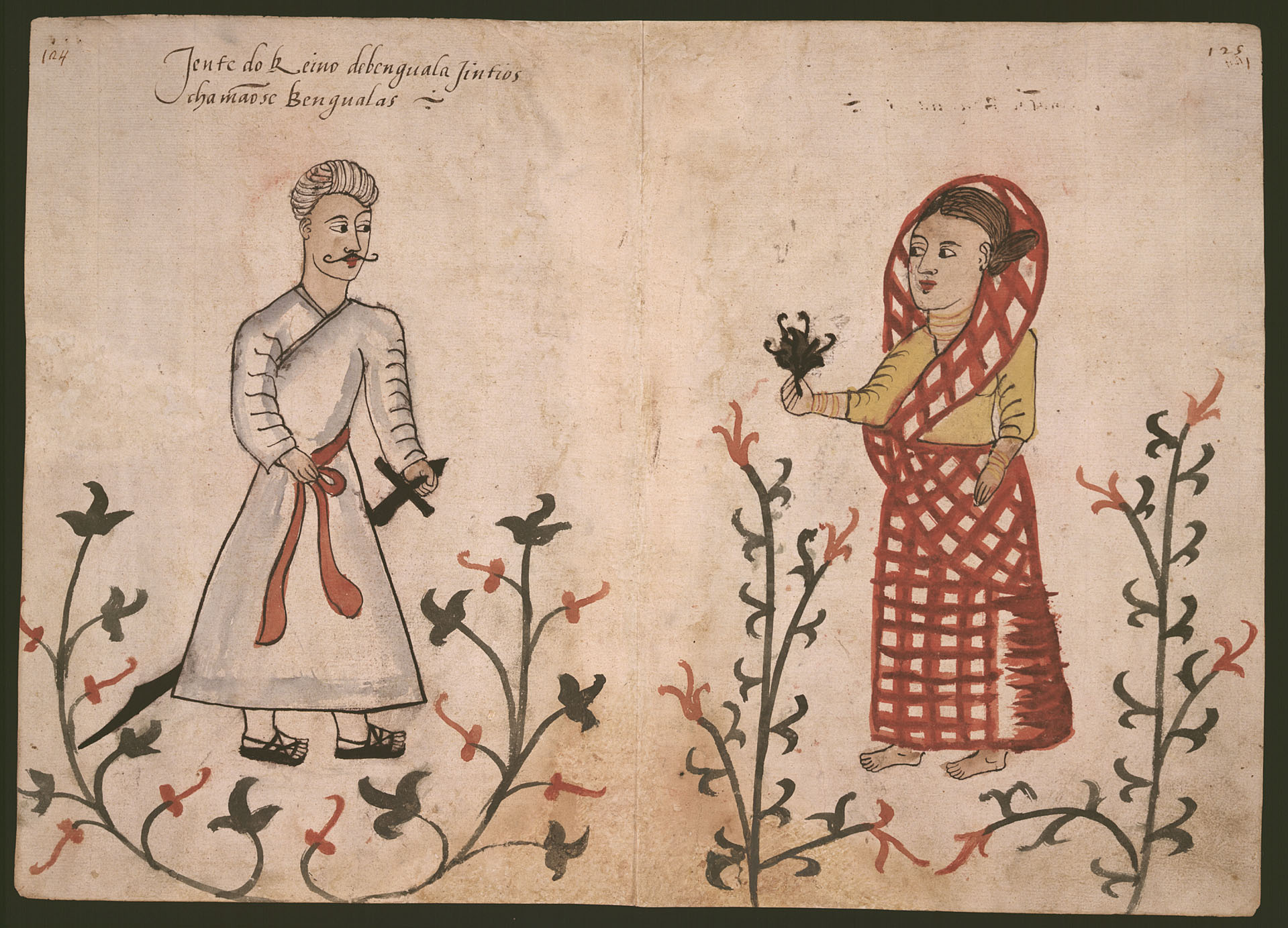
"People of the Kingdom of Bengal", 16th-century Portuguese illustration

Following Vasco Da Gama's landing in southern India, Portuguese traders from Malacca, Ceylon and Bombay began traversing the sea routes of the Bay of Bengal. In the early 16th century, the Bengal Sultanate received official Portuguese envoys. The Sultan gave permission for the establishment of the Portuguese settlement in Chittagong, making it the first European exclave in Bengal. Bengal was identified by the traders as "the richest country to trade with". They had many trade posts in Bengal and used to control the thriving sea port at Chittagong. After subsequent wars against the Arakans and the Mughals, the Portuguese lost their control over Chittagong in the 17th century. However, their descendants still live in the old parts of the city. The Portuguese missionaries laid the foundation for Christianity in Bangladesh.

== High level visits ==
The Bangladesh foreign minister paid an official visit to Lisbon in 2010.

== Economic cooperation ==
Bangladesh and Portugal have shown their deep interest to expand the bilateral economic activities between the two countries and have been taking necessary steps in this regard. In 2010, the two countries signed an agreement on avoidance of double taxation. Both countries have emphasized on the necessity of interaction between the business communities of the two countries through exchange of business delegations.

== Bangladeshi diaspora in Portugal ==
As of 2012, there are about 15,000 Bangladeshi expatriates working in Portugal.

== Resident diplomatic missions ==
- Bangladesh has an embassy in Lisbon.
- Portugal is accredited to Bangladesh from its embassy in New Delhi, India.

== See also ==
- Foreign relations of Bangladesh
- Foreign relations of Portugal
