= Bangladesh–Greece relations =

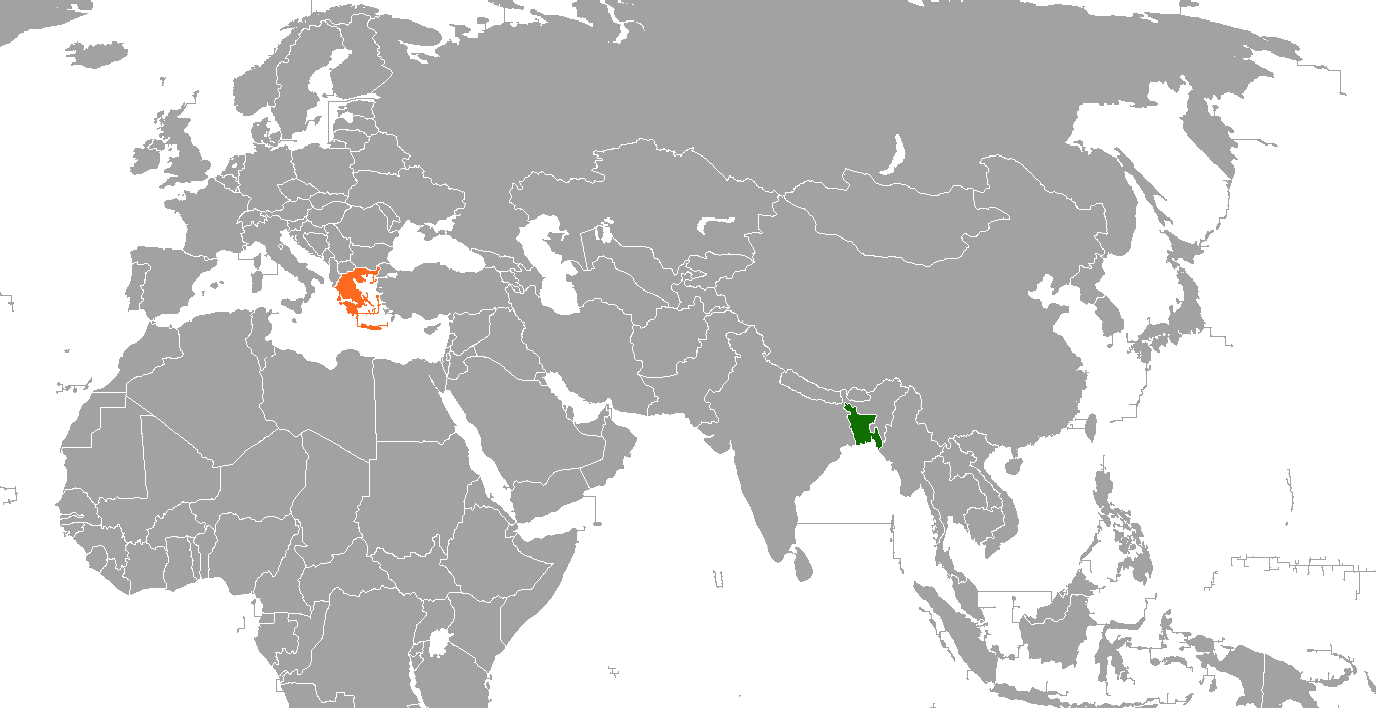

- Bangladesh: Greece

Bangladesh–Greece relations refer to the bilateral relations of Bangladesh and Greece. Diplomatic relations between the two countries were established in March 1972, when Greece became one of the first countries to recognize Bangladesh.

== Diplomatic representation ==
The Bangladeshi has an embassy in Athens, which was established in July 2009. Greece maintains a consulate general in Dhaka.

== High level visits ==
In March 2022, Bangladesh Cultural Affairs State Minister K. M. Khalid visited Athens and attended the celebration of 50 years of diplomatic relations between Greece and Bangladesh.

In February 2022, the Minister of Migration and Asylum, Notis Mitarachi paid an official visit to Dhaka. In October 2019, the Foreign Minister of Bangladesh AK Abdul Momen paid an official visit to Athens. In 2013, then-Greek Minister of Public Order and Citizen Protection Nikos Dendias visited Dhaka.

== Economic relations ==
Bangladesh and Greece have shown mutual interest in expanding bilateral trade and investment. Bangladeshi ready-made garments, pharmaceuticals, ceramics, jute products, frozen food and leather goods have been identified as products with huge potential in the Greek market. Greece has also shown interest in importing ships from Bangladesh. Bangladesh has sought Greece's cooperation in developing its agriculture, shipping, tourism, ICT and renewable energy sectors.

== Cultural relations ==
The 50 years of Greek-Bangladeshi diplomatic relations were celebrated with great brilliance in two special events organized by the Embassy of Bangladesh on 15 and 16 March 2022 in Athens in the presence of the State Minister of Cultural Affairs of Bangladesh K. M. Khalid and the Greek Minister of Culture and Sports Lina Mendoni. On this occasion, the Greek edition of The Unfinished Memoirs of Sheikh Mujibur Rahman was released.

Greek scholars and activists were invited and participated in the World Peace Conference organized by the Ministry of Foreign Affairs of Bangladesh on December 4 and 5, 2021, in Dhaka on the occasion of 50 years of Independence and as part of the ongoing celebration of the birth centenary of Father of the Nation Bangabandhu Sheikh Mujibur Rahman.

== Bangladeshi expatriates in Greece ==
As of 2018, there were about 80,000 Bangladeshi expatriates living in Greece. The community is mainly based in the capital Athens.

== See also ==
- Foreign relations of Bangladesh
- Foreign relations of Greece
- Greek Memorial, Dhaka
