= Bangladesh–Ireland relations =

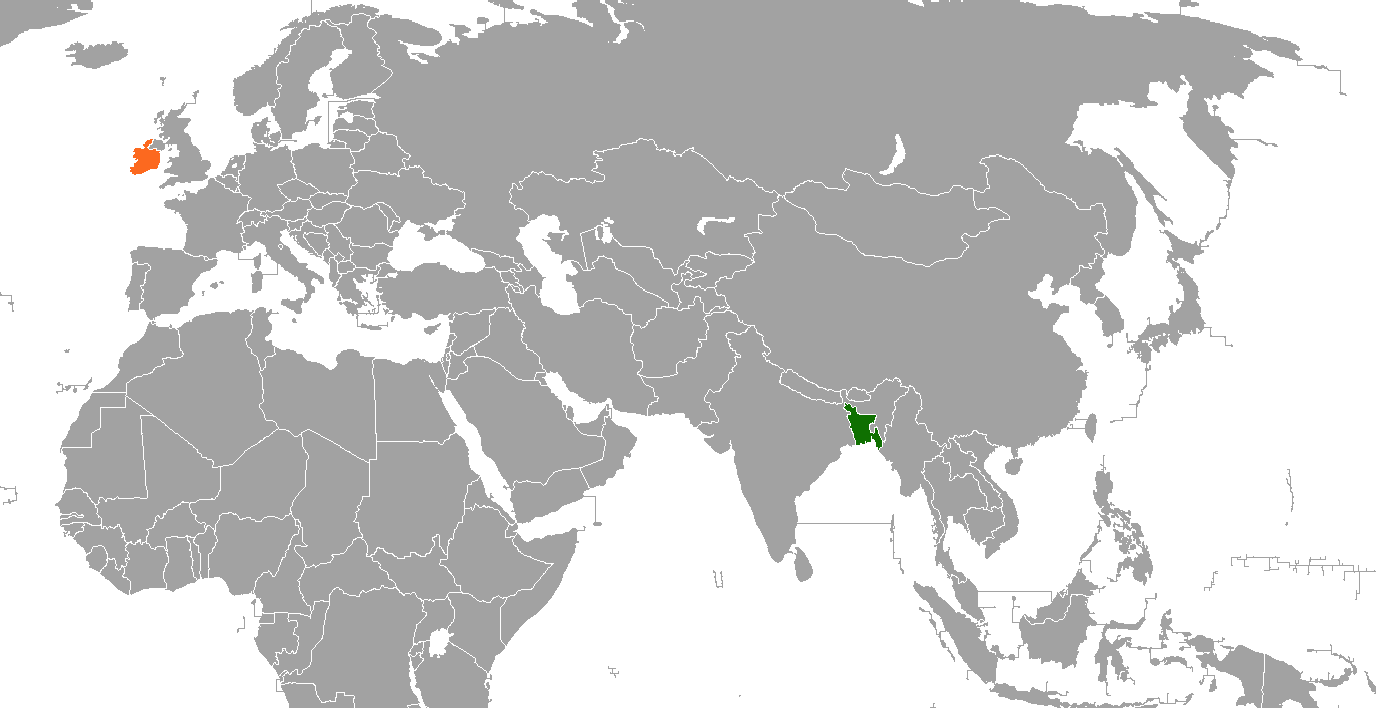

- Bangladesh: Ireland

Bangladesh–Ireland relations refer to the bilateral relations between Bangladesh and Ireland.

Both countries were part of the British Empire, but Bangladesh is a republic in the Commonwealth of Nations, whereas Ireland became a republic outside the Commonwealth of Nations on 18 April 1949 under the terms of the Republic of Ireland Act 1948. Relations between the two countries were established in early 1972.

== Economic cooperation ==
Bangladesh and Ireland have shown mutual interest to expand the bilateral economic activities between the two countries and both the countries have recognized necessary measures to expand the existing trade and investment. Many Irish firms have expressed their interests to invest in Bangladesh in the promising sectors.

In 2009, an Irish trade delegation headed by former Irish Minister for investment and coordination Conor Lenihan visited Bangladesh to explore potential ways for increasing bilateral trade and investment. Ireland has shown interest to recruit skilled IT professionals from Bangladesh.

== Migrants ==
There has been a small Bangladeshi migrant group in Ireland, mainly coming in since the 1990s with general work permits, student visas and as refugees, though the population was still low, with around 1,700 Bangladeshis being recorded in the 2006 census. Since the mid-2010s, many skilled workers and more students have been coming to reside in Ireland. After Brexit, many EU citizens of Bangladeshi descent, mainly Italian and Portuguese nationals, have been moving to Ireland, bringing the estimated population of the Bangladeshi community in Ireland to approximately 20,000 (as of 2025). Additionally, after COVID-19 Bangladeshis seeking asylum have skyrocketed, with a majority of applicants coming from the UK. 99 Bangladeshis applied for asylum in Ireland in 2014 and 2015 the number rose to 231. Some of the Bangladeshis are illegal immigrants.

== Resident diplomatic missions ==
- Bangladesh has an embassy in Dublin.
- Ireland is accredited to Bangladesh from its embassy in New Delhi, India.

== See also ==
- Foreign relations of Bangladesh
- Foreign relations of Ireland
