= White Palace (Baghdad) =

Royal Palace in Baghdad, Iraq

The White Palace (Arabic: القصر الأبيض, romanized: Al-Qaṣr al-Abyadh) is a domed royal palace in Baghdad established by the government of the Kingdom of Iraq, led by politician Arshad al-Umari, at the orders of King Ghazi in 1934. It was established as a royal guest house that received several foreign heads of government. The White Palace is located in a neighborhood right above the Bataween, and the local neighborhood around has since adapted the name al-Qasr al-Abyadh in reference to the building.

The building received its historical importance through being the palace in which foreign affairs decision-making took place, as well as a venue for receiving foreign diplomatic delegations. It received its name from being painted in white paint.

== After the monarchy ==
After the toppling of the Iraqi monarchy in 1958, it was turned into a military museum affiliated with the Ministry of Defense. Around 1967, the palace became notable for hosting the Yemeni president of the time, Abdullah al-Sallal, in which he was informed a coup in the Yemen Arab Republic against his rule whilst he was on trip. Because of the coup, he stayed in the White Palace for two years. Around the 1990s, the ownership of the palace was transferred to the Ministry of Culture after its heritage was recognized, making it a gathering point for artists and cultural events.

Like many important sites in Iraq after the US invasion in 2003, the palace has been neglected. In 2015, it was reported that the site had become infested with intertwined trees that grew randomly, dirt, and debris. The walls of the palace have been marred by advertising posters, workshops, and private factories. In recent years, the palace became the subject of several articles written by journalists bringing to light its neglect and historical importance.

== See also ==
- Al-Rehab Palace
