= Bangladesh–Belgium relations =

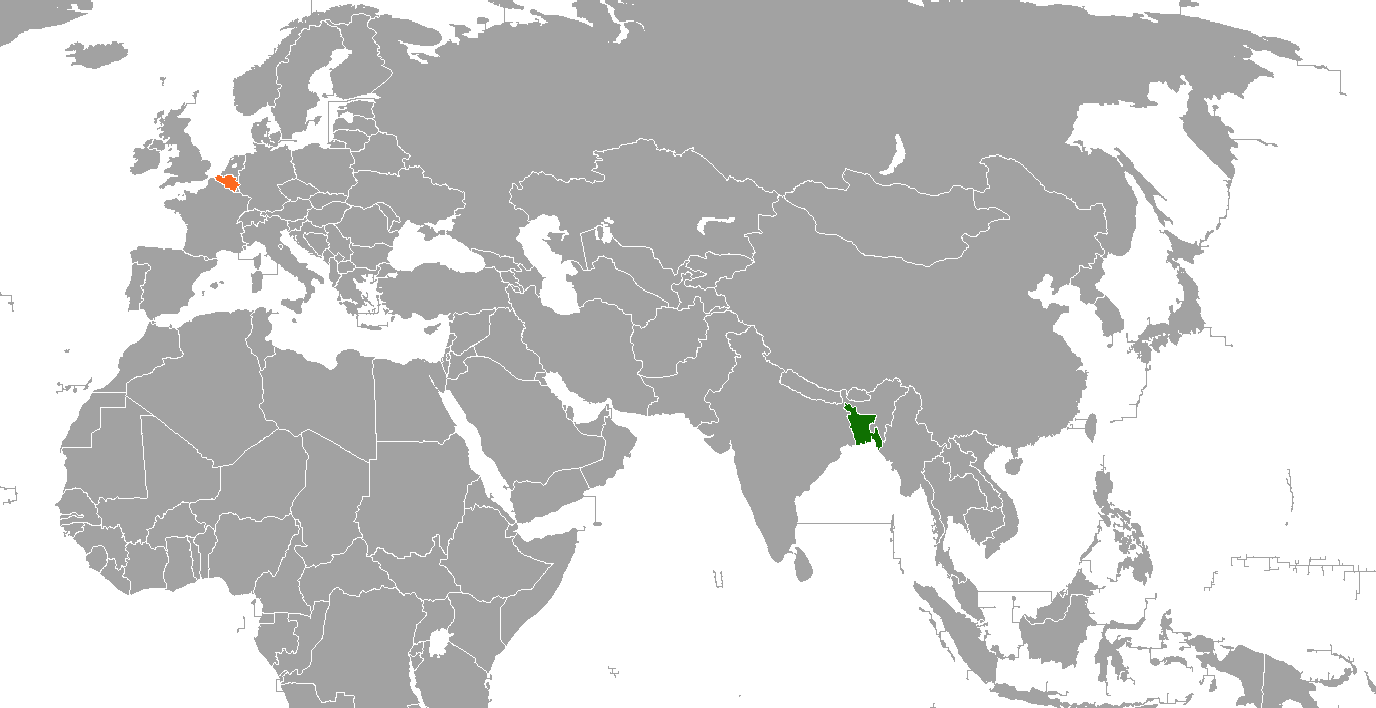

- Bangladesh: Belgium

Bangladesh–Belgium relations refers to bilateral relations between Bangladesh and Belgium. Bangladesh has a resident ambassador in Brussels who is also the ambassador of Bangladesh to Luxembourg. Belgium has a non resident ambassador in New Delhi.

== History ==
The first ambassador of Bangladesh to Belgium, Sanaul Huq, was appointed on 15 May 1973 and served until 30 December 1976. In 1975, Sheikh Hasina and Sheikh Rehana, daughters of President Sheikh Mujibur Rahman, were in Belgium when their father was assassinated. Their host, Ambassador Huq, decided against hosting them following the assassination. Ambassador of Bangladesh to Germany Humayun Rashid Chowdhury provided them shelter in Germany.

In November 2010, Prime Minister of Bangladesh Sheikh Hasina visited the residence of Prime Minister of Belgium Yves Leterme and sought more investment from Belgian companies. Golam Faruk Ahmed is the honorary consul of Belgium in Bangladesh.

The Embassy of Bangladesh organized a Sufi musical night at the Centre for Fine Arts, Brussels on 29 October 2014.

The foreign ministers of the two countries met in Brussels and discussed the Rohingya refugee crisis on 3 March 2018.

In 2020, King Philippe of Belgium has expressed interest in visiting Bangladesh.

== Economic relations ==
In 2019, Belgium sent a trade delegation to Bangladesh. Osama Taseer, president of the Dhaka Chamber of Commerce and Industry, met Francois Delhaye, Belgian ambassador to Bangladesh, and requested more investments from Belgian companies.

Belgian ship breaking companies are working with Bangladesh ship breaking companies to improve labor conditions. In December 2020, Belgian company Jan De Nul signed an agreement with Payra Port Authority to dredge Rabnabad channel to ease access to Payra Port in Bangladesh.

In 2020, Bangladesh was Belgium's 88th largest export destination and 43rd largest importer.

== Diplomatic missions ==
In 1990, Belgium closed its embassy in Dhaka, Bangladesh. Its embassy in New Delhi, India, is accredited to Bangladesh. Per arrangements between Sweden and Belgium, the Swedish Embassy in Dhaka issues Schengen visas for residents of Bangladesh travelling to Belgium.

Md. Shahdat Hossain was appointed the ambassador of Bangladesh to Belgium in 2016.

On 30 June 2020, Mahbub Hassan Saleh was appointed the ambassador of Bangladesh to Belgium.
