= Bangladesh–Latvia relations =

Bilateral relations

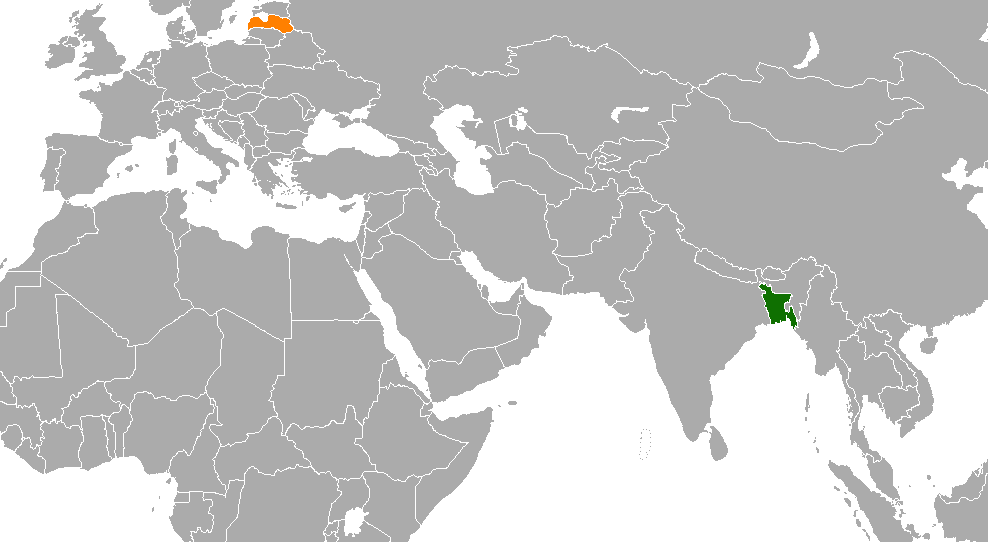

- Bangladesh: Latvia

Bangladesh–Latvia relations refer to the bilateral relations between Bangladesh and Latvia. Bangladesh was one of the first countries to recognize Latvia in 1991. Diplomatic relations between the two countries officially started on 21 January 1993. Bangladesh has a non resident ambassador in Warsaw. Latvia has a non resident ambassador in New Delhi.

== High level visits ==
Bangladeshi foreign minister Dipu Moni paid an official visit to Riga in 2012.

== Political cooperation ==
In 2006, Latvian Secretary of State of the Ministry of Foreign Affairs, Normans Penke emphasized on the regular bilateral dialogues between the foreign ministries of the two countries to improve the flow of information and to promote the media of both the countries. Two Latvian observers participated in European Commission's delegation to observe the 2008 Bangladeshi general election.

== Educational cooperation ==
In 2003, former Latvian President Vaira Vike-Freiberga termed education sector as one of the first areas of interest to Bangladesh. Bangladesh has proposed to sign an MoU with Latvia for the cooperation on higher education putting major emphasize on science and technology. Besides, both the sides agreed to form partnerships towards undertaking collaborative research, initiating joint degree programs, instituting exchange programs.

== Economic cooperation ==
Bangladeshi ready made garments, pharmaceutical products, sea foods etc. have been identified as products with huge potential in the Latvian market. Latvia has agreed to send business delegations to Bangladesh for exploring potential ways to increase bilateral trade and investment predominantly in the field of agro-business.

== Agricultural cooperation ==
Bangladesh and Latvia have signed an MoU on cooperation in agriculture sector, having major focus on livestock production, dairying, crop breeding, inland and marine fisheries.

== Diplomatic missions ==
Neither country has a resident ambassador.

- Bangladesh is accredited to Latvia from its embassy in Warsaw, Poland.
- Latvia is accredited to Bangladesh from its embassy in New Delhi, India.

== See also ==
- Foreign relations of Bangladesh
- Foreign relations of Latvia
