= List of diplomatic missions in Bangladesh =

This is a list of diplomatic missions in Bangladesh. At present, the capital city of Dhaka hosts 49 resident embassies and high commissions, including the European Union delegation.

Other countries have accredited missions to Bangladesh by being resident in neighboring nations.

Honorary consulates and trade missions are omitted from this listing.

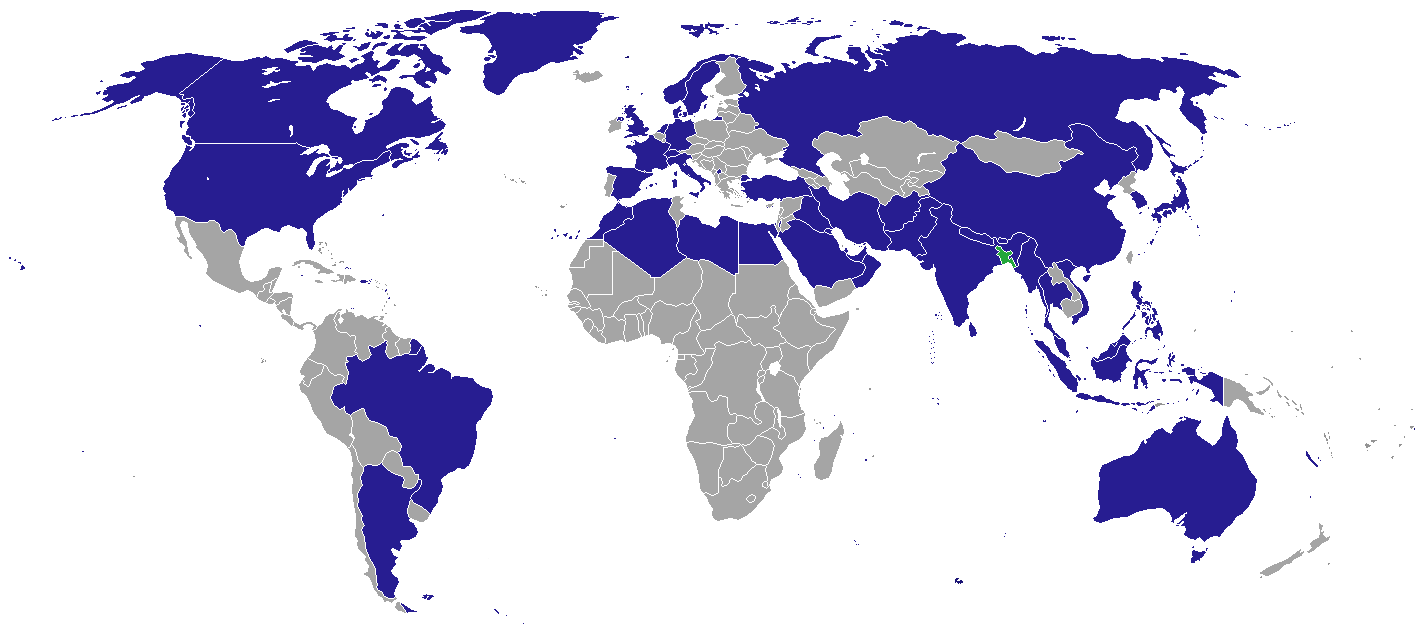
Map of diplomatic missions in Bangladesh

== Diplomatic missions in Dhaka ==
=== Embassies and high commissions ===
Entries marked with an asterisk (*) are member-states of the Commonwealth of Nations. As such, their embassies are formally termed as "high commissions".

1. Afghanistan
2. Algeria
3. Argentina (article)
4. Australia*
5. Bhutan
6. Brazil
7. Brunei*
8. Canada*
9. China
10. Denmark
11. Egypt
12. France (article)
13. Germany (article)
14. Holy See (article)
15. India* (article)
16. Indonesia
17. Iran
18. Iraq
19. Italy
20. Japan (article)
21. Kosovo
22. Kuwait
23. Libya
24. Malaysia*
25. Maldives (article)*
26. Morocco
27. Myanmar
28. Nepal
29. Netherlands
30. Norway
31. Oman
32. Pakistan (article)*
33. Palestine (article)
34. Philippines
35. Qatar
36. Russia
37. Saudi Arabia
38. Singapore*
39. South Korea
40. Spain
41. Sri Lanka*
42. Sweden
43. Switzerland
44. Thailand
45. Turkey
46. United Arab Emirates
47. United Kingdom* (article)
48. United States (article)
49. Vietnam

=== Other missions or delegations ===
1. European Union (Delegation)
2. Hungary (Embassy office)

=== Gallery ===
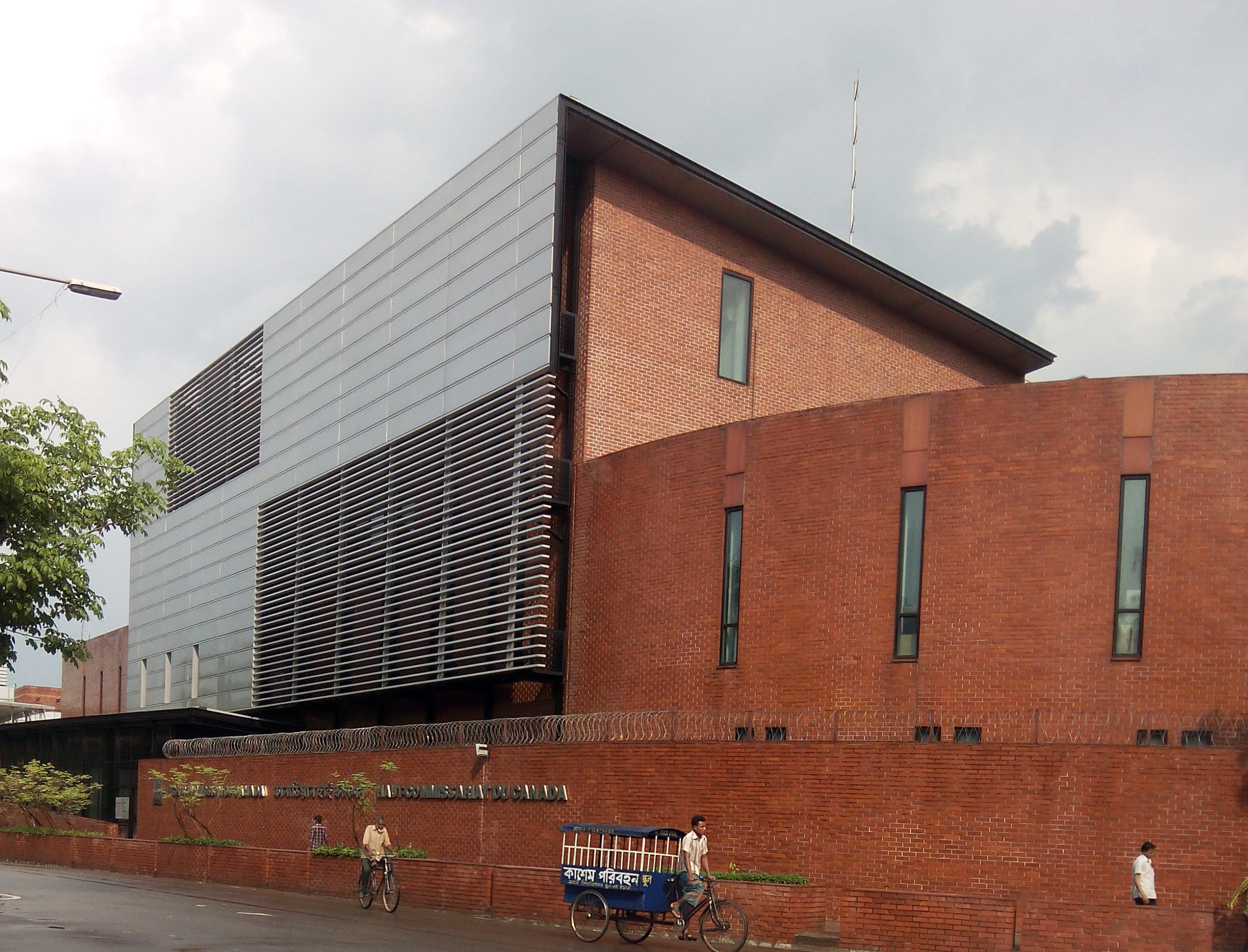
High Commission of Canada

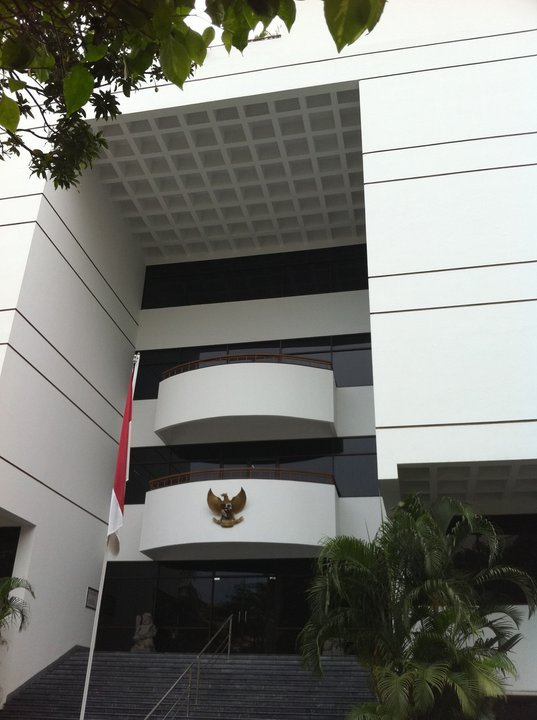
Embassy of Indonesia

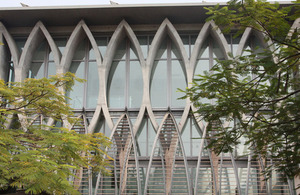
High Commission of the United Kingdom

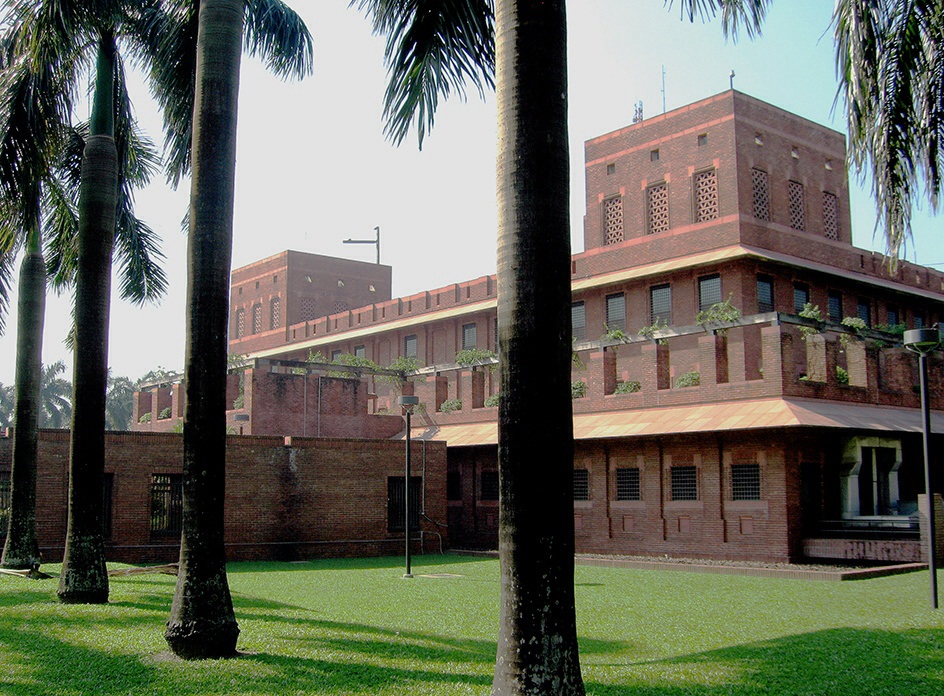
Embassy of the United States

== Consular missions ==
=== Chittagong ===
- India (Assistant High Commission)

=== Khulna ===
- India (Assistant High Commission)

=== Rajshahi ===
- India (Assistant High Commission)

=== Sylhet ===
- India (Assistant High Commission)
- United Kingdom (Consular office)

== Non-resident embassies/high commissions/representative offices ==
=== Resident in Beijing, China ===
1. Albania
2. Cape Verde
3. Dominica
4. El Salvador
5. Honduras
6. Micronesia
7. Kiribati
8. São Tomé and Príncipe

=== Resident in Islamabad, Pakistan ===
1. Bahrain
2. Jordan
3. Kazakhstan
4. Lebanon
5. Somalia
6. Sudan
7. Tunisia

=== Resident in New Delhi, India ===
1. Angola
2. Austria
3. Azerbaijan
4. Belgium
5. Bosnia and Herzegovina
6. Cambodia
7. Chad
8. Chile
9. Costa Rica
10. Colombia
11. Cuba
12. Cyprus
13. Czech Republic
14. Estonia
15. Finland
16. Georgia
17. Greece
18. Guatemala
19. Guinea
20. Hungary
21. Iceland
22. Ireland
23. Ivory Coast
24. Jamaica
25. Laos
26. Latvia
27. Lesotho
28. Lithuania
29. Mali
30. Malta
31. Mauritius
32. Mexico
33. Nigeria
34. Panama
35. Paraguay
36. Peru
37. Poland
38. Portugal
39. Romania
40. Serbia
41. Seychelles
42. Slovakia
43. Slovenia
44. South Africa
45. South Sudan
46. Syria
47. Taiwan
48. Tanzania
49. Togo
50. Turkmenistan
51. Uganda
52. Ukraine
53. Uzbekistan
54. Yemen
55. Zimbabwe
56. Zambia

=== Resident elsewhere ===
- Central African Republic (Doha)
- Eswatini (Kuala Lumpur)
- Guinea-Bissau (Riyadh)
- Haiti (Taipei)
- Liberia (Abu Dhabi)
- Mauritania (Abu Dhabi)
- New Zealand (Colombo)
- Sierra Leone (Abu Dhabi)
- Saint Kitts and Nevis (Taipei)
- Saint Lucia (Taipei)
- Timor-Leste (Jakarta)
- Tonga (Canberra)
- Vanuatu (Canberra)

== Former embassies ==
- Belgium (closed in 1990) (Note: Resident in New Delhi, India)
- Bulgaria (closed in 1992)
- North Korea (article) (closed in 2023)
- Poland (closed in 2005)
- Romania (closed in 1996)
- Yugoslavia (closed in 1992) (Note: Serbian, Slovenian and Bosnian resident in New Delhi, India)

== See also ==
- Foreign relations of Bangladesh
- List of diplomatic missions of Bangladesh
