= March for Gaza =

2025 mass procession in Bangladesh

- Part of the Gaza war protests
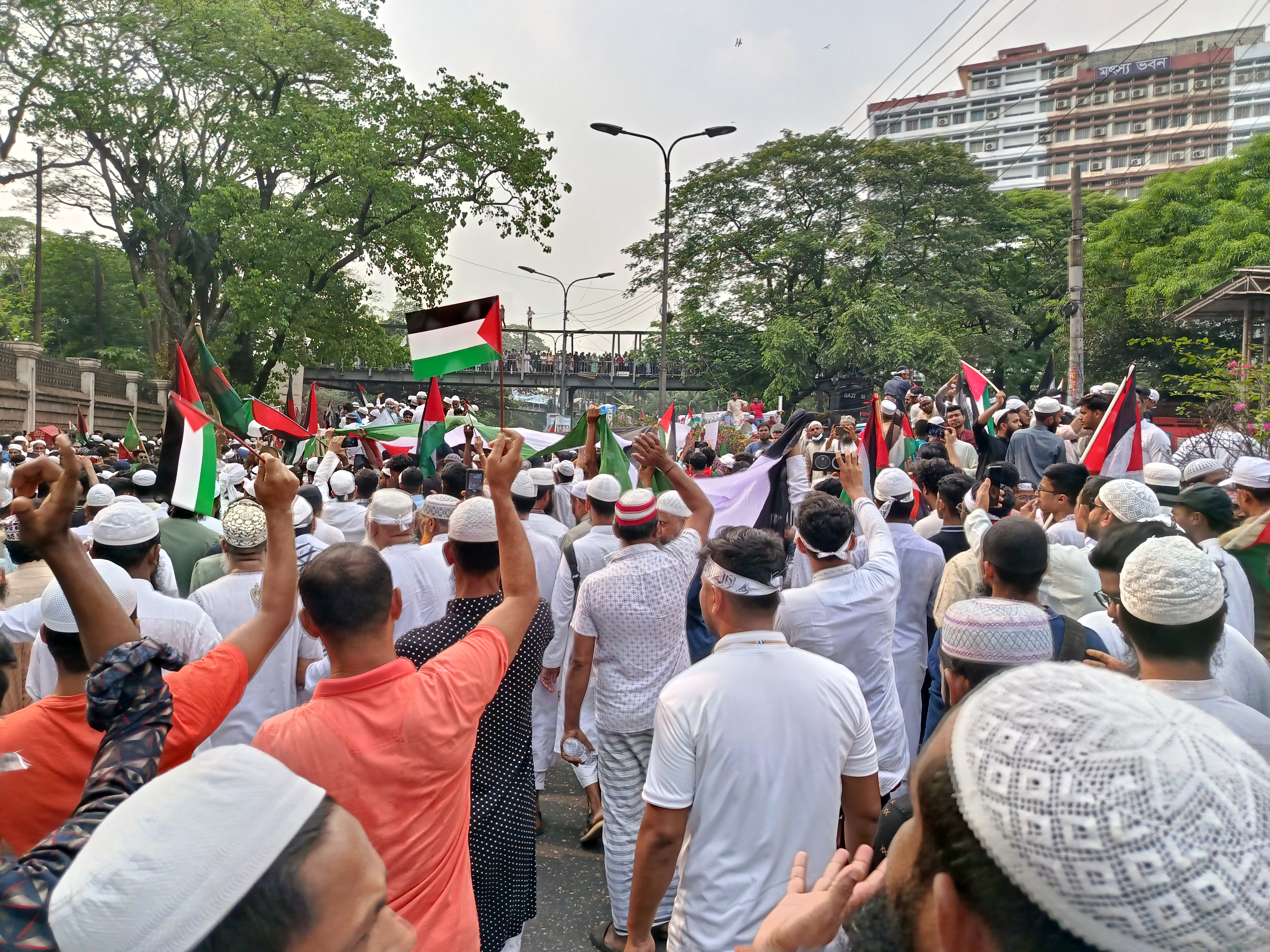
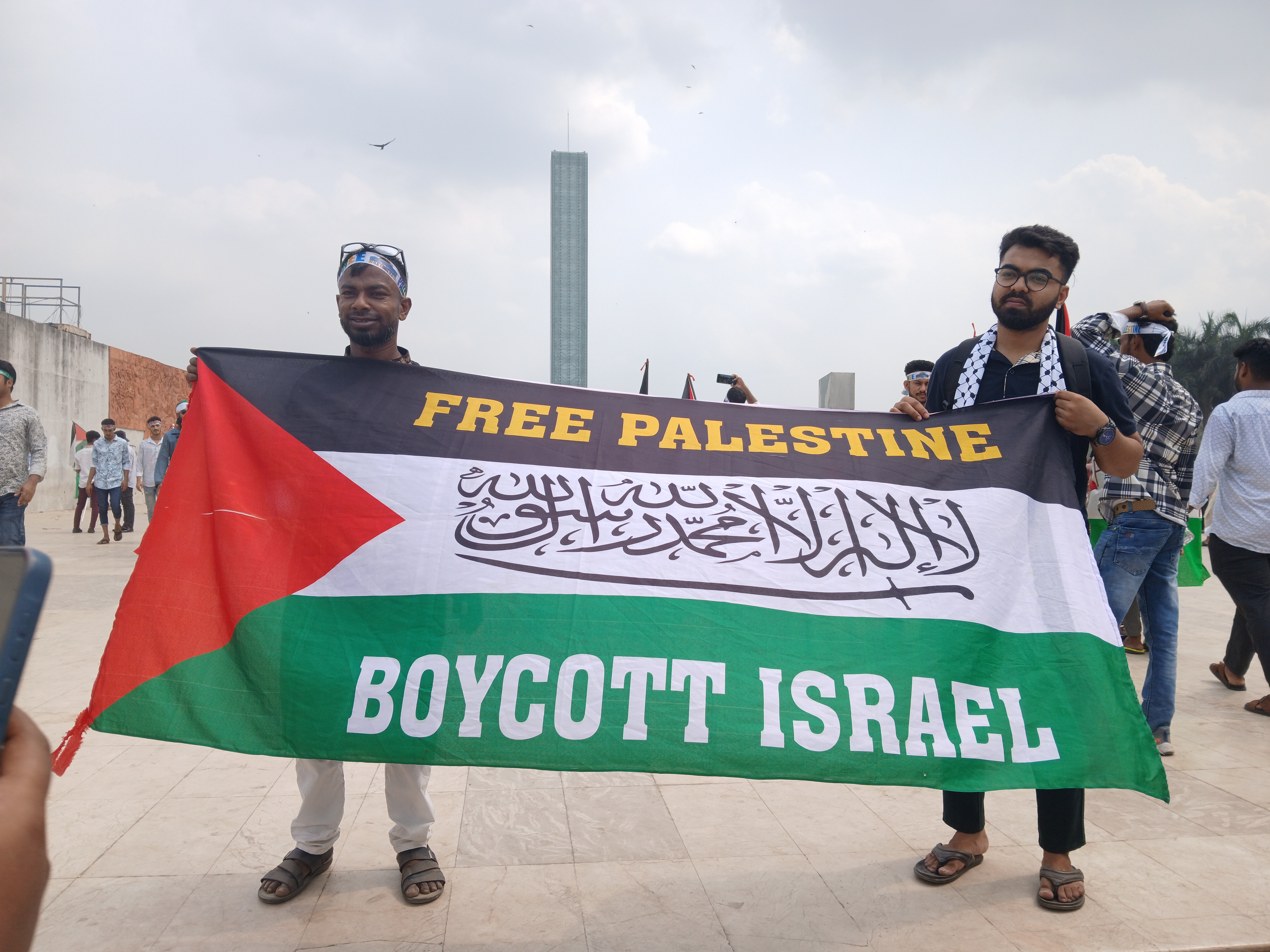
- Clockwise from top: Mass gathering at Segunbagicha; Two individuals displaying a modified Palestinian flag with shahada written in the middle at Suhrawardy Udyan
- Date: 12 April 2025
- Time: 3.00 pm (UTC+6)
- Venue: Suhrawardy Udyan
- Location: Shahbagh, Dhaka, Bangladesh
- Type: Mass procession, demonstration, protest rally
- Cause: Gaza war
- Motive: Showing solidarity with the Palestinians of the Gaza Strip
- Patrons: Mizanur Rahman Azhari; Muhammad Abdul Malek; Sheikh Ahmadullah; Hasnat Abdullah
- Organised by: Palestine Solidarity Movement; Al-Markazul Islami
- Participants: est. 100,000—1,000,000
- Outcome: The phrase "except Israel" reinstated on Bangladeshi passports

The March for Gaza, held on 12 April 2025 in Dhaka, Bangladesh, was a large-scale pro-Palestine demonstration organized to show solidarity with the people of the Gaza Strip amidst the ongoing Gaza war.

The rally took place at Suhrawardy Udyan and drew a diverse group of participants, including political leaders, Islamic scholars, social activists, and members of the public. Demonstrators called for an end to Israeli military actions in the Gaza Strip and urged the global Muslim community to cut diplomatic and economic ties with Israel. It marked the largest pro-Palestine protest in Bangladesh's history.

== Rally ==
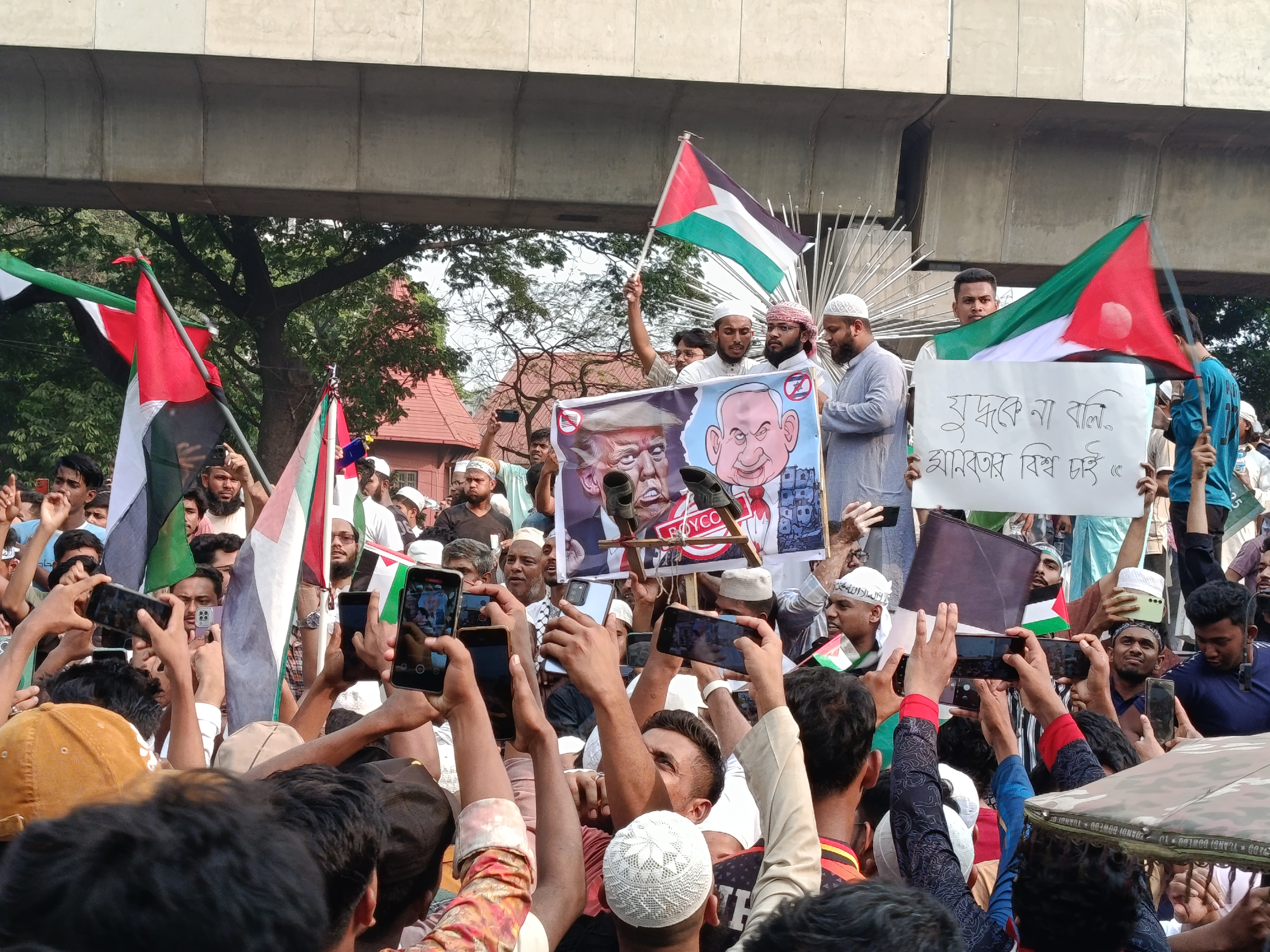
Attendees beat caricatures of Donald Trump and Benjamin Netanyahu with shoes

The event was organized by the Palestine Solidarity Movement, a pro-Palestine Islamic platform in Bangladesh. The event was presided over by Muhammad Abdul Malek, the Khatib of Baitul Mukarram National Mosque. Thousands of people joined the rally at Suhrawardy Udyan, with many arriving in processions from across the capital.

Peaceful demonstrations marked the protest, featuring symbolic displays like mock coffins and passionate speeches. Protesters carried symbolic coffins and effigies representing civilian casualties, expressing grief and resistance. Many among them beat images of US President Donald Trump, Israeli Prime Minister Benjamin Netanyahu, and Indian Prime Minister Narendra Modi, accusing them of supporting Israel and its actions. However, security forces did not allow and seized black standards, hats, or banners similar to those of ISIS and other militant groups.

National team cricketers including Mahmudullah Riyad and Mehedi Hasan Miraz joined the protest. Islamic scholars such as Sheikh Ahmadullah and Mizanur Rahman Azhari also participated. Political parties including the Bangladesh Nationalist Party (BNP), National Citizen Party (NCP), Amar Bangladesh Party (ABP), Hefazat-e-Islam, and Jamaat-e-Islami expressed solidarity through their presence. The event included speeches from prominent political and religious figures.

== Declarations ==
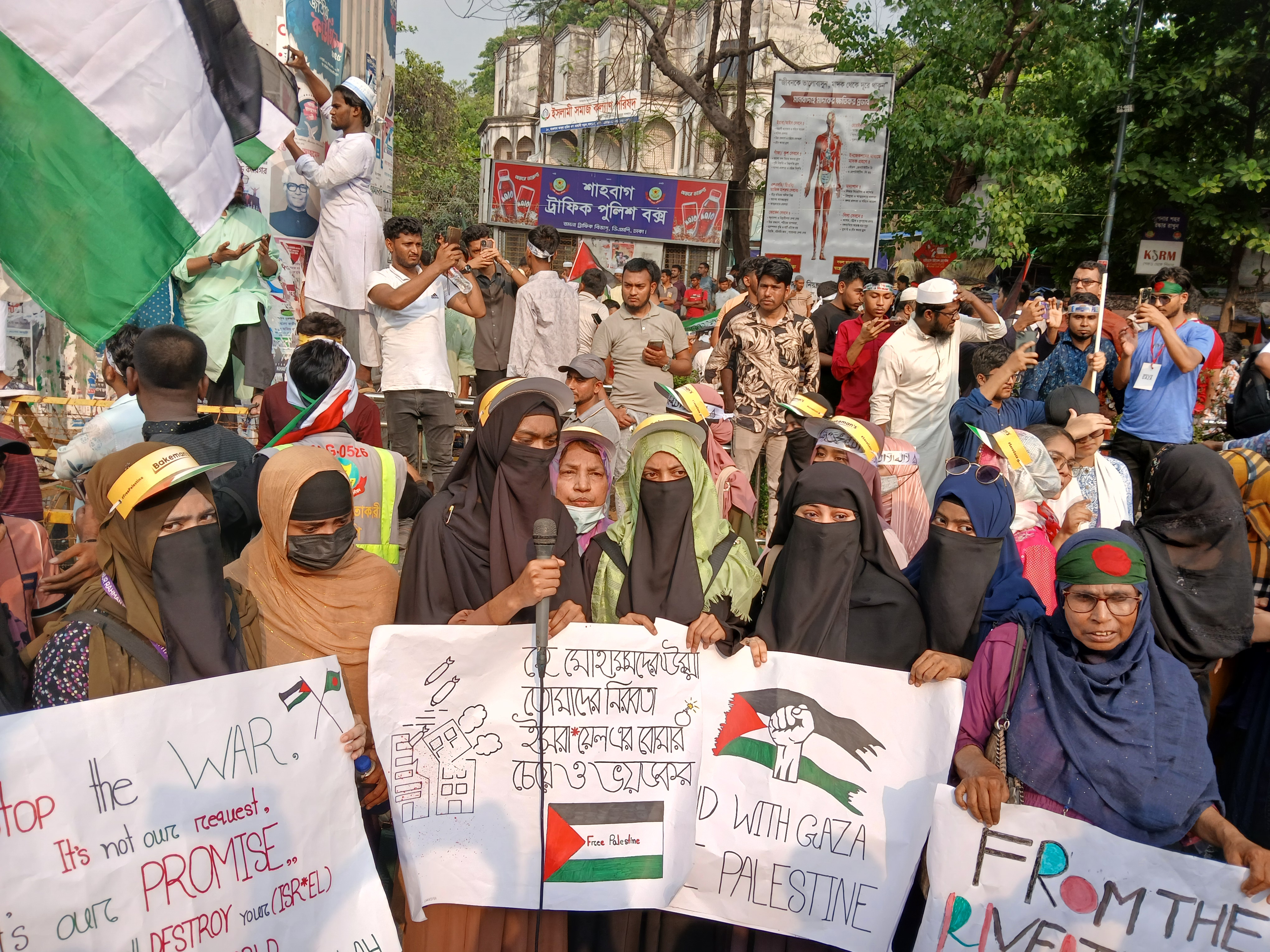
Female attendees marching to the event

Mahmudur Rahman, editor of Amar Desh, read out the formal declaration from the stage. In the declaration, four demands were made and pledges were read out. The first demands were to the United Nations and the international community, which stated that–

1. The trial of the Zionist Israeli genocide must be ensured in the International Court of Justice;
2. Not a ceasefire, but effective and concerted steps must be taken to stop the genocide;
3. An obligation must be created to return the pre-1967 lands;
4. East Jerusalem must be internationally recognized as the capital of the Palestinian state;
5. The path must be opened for the Palestinians to establish self-determination, security, and state sovereignty.

The second demands were to the leaders of the Muslim Ummah, which stated that–

1. All economic, military, and diplomatic relations with Israel must be severed immediately;
2. Trade blockades and sanctions must be imposed against the Zionist state;
3. We must stand with all-out support for the oppressed people of Gaza;
4. We must launch an active diplomatic campaign to isolate Israel at the international level;
5. The OIC and Muslim countries must take a strong protest and effective diplomatic stance against the state aggression against the rights of Muslims in India, an ally of the Zionists, especially the Waqf amendment act.

The third demands are to the Bangladesh government, where the demands state—

1. Reinstate the condition except Israel in Bangladeshi passports, and clearly state our position of not recognizing them as a state;
2. All agreements with Israeli institutions that have been signed with the government must be canceled;
3. Effective measures must be taken to send relief and medical aid to Gaza by the state;
4. All government institutions and import policies must be ordered to boycott the products of Zionist companies;
5. The state must protest against the ongoing persecution of Muslims and other minorities under the Hindutva government of India, which is an ally of the Zionists;
6. Textbooks and education policies must include the history of the struggle of Al-Aqsa, Palestine, and Muslims, so that future generations are raised with a Muslim identity.

The final demands, which Mahmudur Rahman refers to as "to ourselves", are essentially a pledge:

We will boycott every product, company, and force that sustains Israel's occupation; we will prepare our society to produce Nuruddins and Salahuddins who will restore the pulpit of Baitul Muqaddis. We will raise our children to be ready to sacrifice their lives and property to protect their ideals and territory; we will not be divided, because we know that it is never too late to occupy a divided people. We will remain united so that this Bangladesh never becomes the next Gaza of a Hindutva project. We will start from our own homes, leaving the imprint of this commitment everywhere - language, history, education, economy, society.

== Reactions ==
On 12 April 2025, Palestinian Ambassador to Bangladesh Yousef Y. Ramadan said in a statement to the media that the March for Gaza will "go down in history." He added:

Dhaka continues to amaze the world with its unparalleled sincerity. What the world witnessed on April 12 will go down in history as one of the greatest declarations of support and solidarity with the Palestinian people, echoing across borders and for generations.

== Outcomes ==
On 13 April 2025, Ministry of Home Affairs reinstated the phrase "except Israel" at the end of the phrase "this passport is valid for all countries of the world" which appears on Bangladeshi passports.

== See also ==
- Gaza war protests
- National March on Washington: Free Palestine
- Bangladesh–Palestine relations
- Israel–Bangladesh relations
