= Bangladesh–Palestine relations =

- Bangladesh: Palestine

Diplomatic mission
- Embassy of Bangladesh, Amman: Embassy of Palestine, Dhaka

Envoy
- Ambassador Nahida Sobhan: Chargé d'Affaires Yousef S. Y. Ramadan

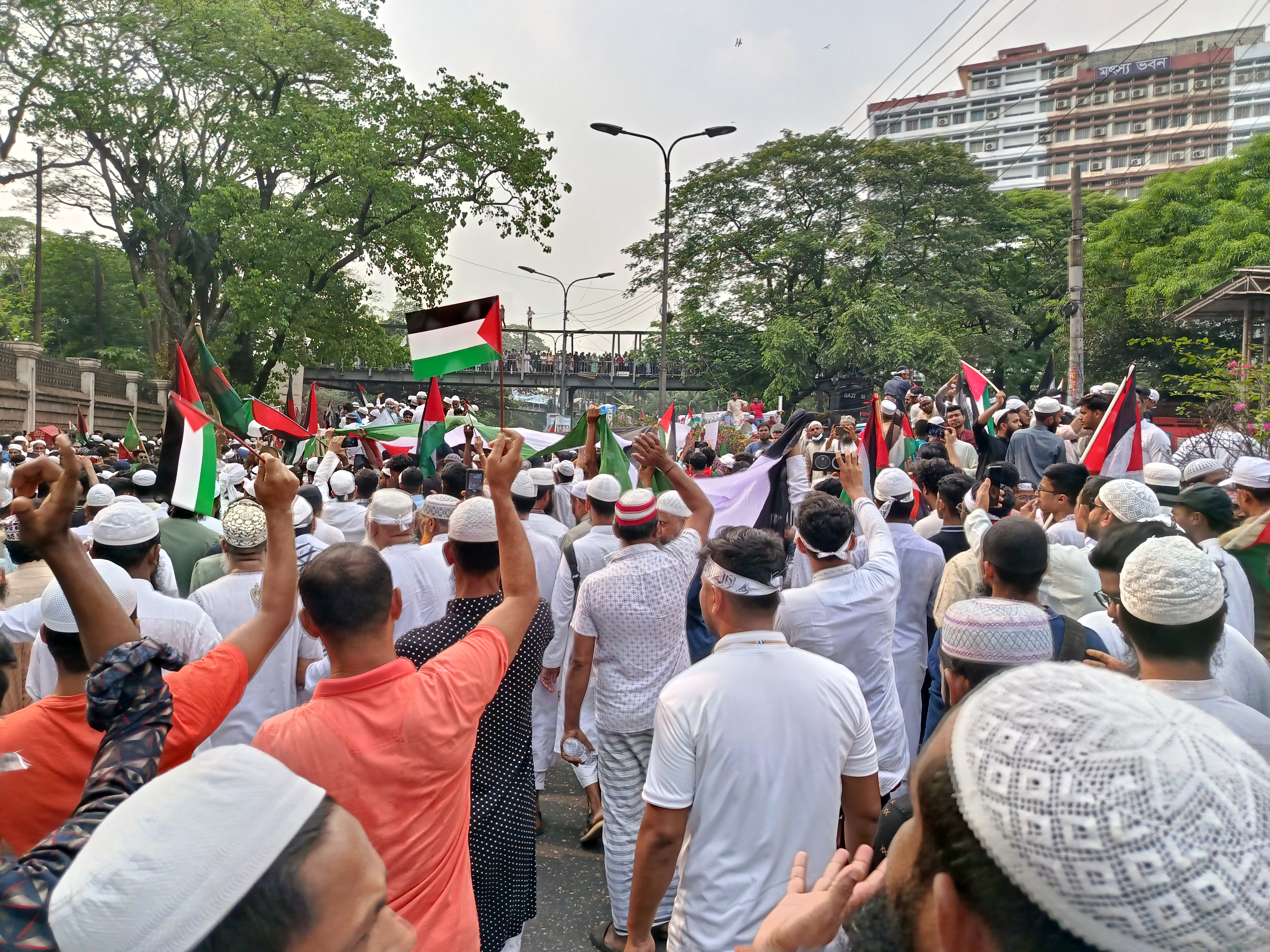
March for Gaza procession organized in April 2025 at Suhrawardy Udyan, Dhaka to express solidarity with the Gazans in the ongoing Gaza war

Relations between the People's Republic of Bangladesh and the State of Palestine are close and cordial. Bangladesh has been a consistent supporter of the Palestinians right to be an independent state. Bangladesh has a complete ban on trade (direct and indirect) with the State of Israel and has no diplomatic relations with it. Bangladesh supports the establishment of a Palestinian state drawn on the 1967 boundary with East Jerusalem as the capital. Palestine is represented in Bangladesh by the Embassy of the State of Palestine in Dhaka. Yousef S. Y. Ramadan is the Palestinian Chargé d'Affaires in Dhaka.

== History ==
Prior to Bangladeshi independence, many Bengalis of East Pakistan expressed their intention to fight in the 1948 Arab–Israeli War. The relationship between Bangladesh and Palestine, particularly the Palestine Liberation Organization (PLO), can be traced back to the Bangladesh War of Independence in 1971. Bangladesh rejected recognition from Israel. At first, most Arab states were hesitant to recognize the newly established state of Bangladesh, but relations warmed in 1973, when Bangladesh supported the Palestinians' against Israel during the Yom Kippur War in 1973 including sending a medical team and relief supplies for Palestinians.

The first high-level meeting between the two countries took place in 1974, when Yasser Arafat met Prime Minister Sheikh Mujibur Rahman in Lahore at the second summit of the Organization of Islamic Cooperation (OIC). A relationship with the Palestinian Liberation Organization (PLO) was established around that time period, in which Bangladesh opened a PLO office in the capital, Dhaka, and PLO officials were frequent guests at events hosted by the Bangladeshi political and diplomatic corps.

In 1980, a postal stamp was created depicting a Palestinian freedom fighter, the Al-Aqsa mosque in the background shrouded by barbed wire, and text celebrating Palestinian fighters as "valiant" in English and Arabic.

Yasser Arafat visited Bangladesh several times between the 1970s and 1990s, including accompanying Nelson Mandela and Süleyman Demirel for Bangladesh's 25 year anniversary of independence. He usually received a warm welcome from Bangladeshi media, political circles and the general public. According to a September 1988 US Library of Congress report, the Bangladeshi government reported in 1987, that 8,000 Bangladeshi youths had volunteered to fight for the PLO following this visit.

476 Bangladeshis were captured and tortured by Israeli forces in prison camps in the 1982 Lebanon War. Bengalis reportedly shot down 29 Israeli aircraft and inflicted dozens of casualties in the war. Some Bangladeshis were reported missing and Kamal Mustafa Ali, who was a Bangladeshi was martyred during a battle in 1982.

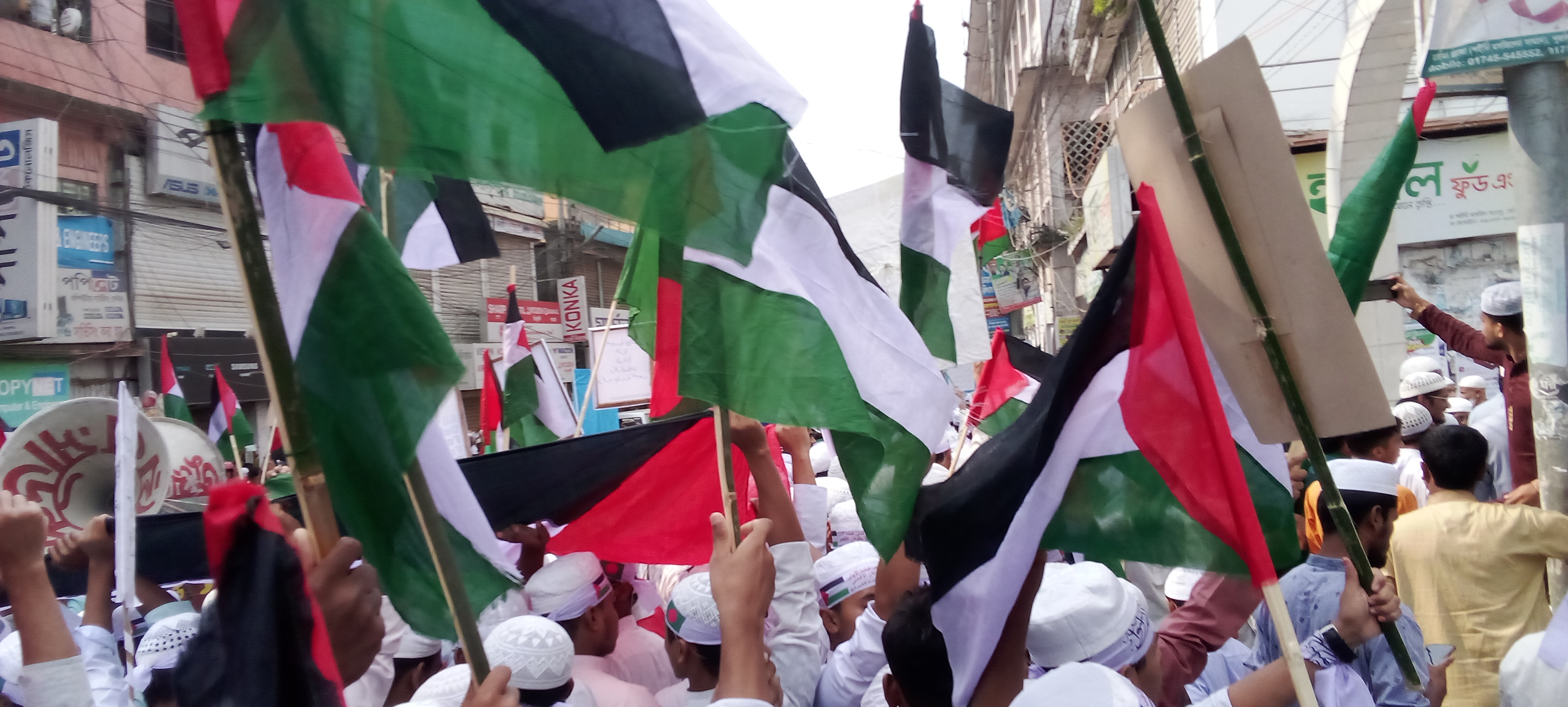
Protest in support of Palestinians in Gaza war, Kishoreganj, Bangladesh

During the ongoing Gaza war and Gaza Genocide, Bangladesh showed support for Palestine, and backed South Africa's genocide case against Israel. In a statement, the Ministry of Foreign Affairs strongly condemned the Israeli bombardments on Gaza Strip for "ethnic cleansing" of Palestinians and urged the international community to take immediate and effective step to implement an unconditional ceasefire, protect the lives of civilians, and deliver humanitarian aid; it also affirmed its support for Palestinian self-determination and the establishment of an independent Palestinian state on the basis of the pre-1967 borders with East Jerusalem as its capital. Bangladesh also called for a ceasefire several times. Bangladesh government sent relief aid including food and medical supplies to Gaza in Ramadan. Conversely, Palestine Authority also sent relief aid to Bangladesh during the August 2024 Bangladesh floods.

Apart from the government, various political parties, including the Jamaat-e-Islami, supported a ceasefire and demonstrated expressing support for Palestine in Gaza war. and On 12 April 2025, Bangladesh organized March for Gaza procession in Suhrawardy Udyan, which attracted around a million participants. It was the largest ever pro-Palestine demonstration in Bangladesh's history.

== Mutual cooperation ==
Bangladesh offers scholarship for Palestinian students in medical colleges in Bangladesh and Palestinian factions officers are provided training in Bangladeshi military facilities. Since the 1980s under International Military Education and Training (IMET), there has been development of military ties between the PLO and Bangladesh, with PLO soldiers attending one-year courses at the Bangladesh Military Academy in Chittagong.

In December 2016, Bangladesh signed a memorandum of understanding with Palestine on trade and energy cooperation. Palestinian President Mahmoud Abbas visited Dhaka in February 2017.

== See also ==
- Bangladesh–Israel relations
- Foreign relations of Bangladesh
- Foreign relations of Palestine
- List of diplomatic missions of the State of Palestine
- List of diplomatic missions of Bangladesh
- Saiful Azam
