= Bangladesh–Israel relations =

- Israel: Bangladesh

The People's Republic of Bangladesh and the State of Israel do not have diplomatic relations. Bangladesh has stated that it will not recognize Israel until there is an independent Palestinian state. Bangladesh has long advocated for a two-state solution, envisioning Palestine and Israel coexisting as independent states in adherence to UN Resolutions 242 and 338, with the aim of establishing enduring peace and stability in the region. Some reports have alleged that Bangladesh and Israel maintain some trade relations indirectly and sometimes secretly and via proxies, although the Bangladesh government denies these allegations.

== Diplomacy ==
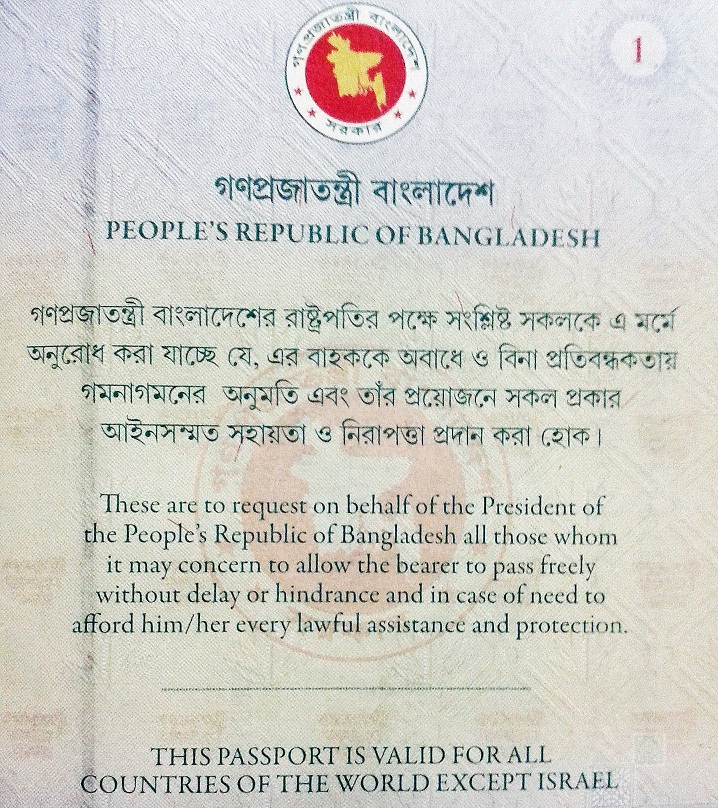
Bangladeshi Passport prohibits to travel to Israel

Bangladesh is one of the 29 UN member states that does not recognize the State of Israel and it was very clear from the time of its inception. It is one of several countries that officially bans its citizens from traveling to Israel and does not accept Israeli passports.

In late May 2021, Hasina government removed the phrase "except Israel" from Bangladeshi passport to meet the "international standard" from an earlier version, which said, "This passport is valid for all countries of the world except Israel". The removal was only from their e-passport, and removal from machine-readable passports (MRP) is in process. Though the term was removed from the passport, Bangladesh did not remove the ban on traveling to Israel with a Bangladeshi passport. However, in April 2025, "except Israel" was reinstated in Bangladeshi passports by the Yunus government.

Bangladesh has expressed its solidarity with the Palestinian people during the Gaza war.

== History ==
Israel was one of the first nations to recognize independent Bangladesh in February 1972. Both the Israeli Government and the Israeli public supported the aspirations of the Bengali people of East Pakistan during the Bangladesh Liberation War in 1971. After the independence of Bangladesh, the newly formed country was quickly recognized by Israel on 7 February 1972. However, the Government of Bangladesh officially rejected the Israeli recognition, stating that it would not recognize the Israeli state until there is an independent Palestinian state. On behalf of the Bangladeshi Government, the then Foreign Minister of Bangladesh, Khondaker Mostaq Ahmad, issued a letter saying this recognition was not acceptable.

In November 2003, Bangladeshi journalist Salah Choudhury was arrested for attempting to fly to Tel Aviv, arraigned for "sedition, treason, and blasphemy", and sentenced to a seven-year prison term. Bangladesh officially supports a sovereign Palestinian state, hosting a Palestinian embassy in its capital, and "an end to Israel's illegal occupation of Palestine".

In the immediate aftermath of the 2006 Lebanon War, Bangladesh offered to send battalions of its infantrymen to help with the UN peacekeeping force, but Israel rejected it, stating that Bangladesh does not recognize Israel. Although Israel rejected the country's participation, Bangladesh was one of the first countries whose troops reached the shores of south Lebanon. Whereas western nations, such as the original leader and top contributor to Lebanon, France, delayed their deployment. As of May 2015, Bangladesh has 326 peacekeepers participating in UNIFIL in Lebanon.

In a September 2011 statement published in The Jerusalem Post, an Israeli government spokesperson said, "We have no conflict with Bangladesh. We want dialogue. We want people-to-people relations. We welcome the religious-minded people of Bangladesh to visit the holy land of Jerusalem". Israel fruitlessly "sought a relationship with Bangladesh" after they had established "full diplomatic relations with China and India in 1992". Bangladeshi Prime Minister Sheikh Hasina said in 2014, "We have been continuing our support to the Palestinians and occupation of their land by the Israelis is never acceptable".

In May 2016, Bangladesh Prime Minister Sheikh Hasina alleged that opposition party BNP joined with Israeli national intelligence agency Mossad to overthrow her government through a coup after it had been reported that Mohammad Aslam Chowdhury, the joint secretary general of the BNP, met the Israeli politician Mendi N. Safadi during a visit to India. Chowdhury claimed that the meeting was accidental. On 7 June 2016, Bangladeshi Home Minister Asaduzzaman Khan alleged that the main opposition party, the BNP, has a link to the recent fundamentalist attacks in Bangladesh, and these attacks are part of a wider conspiracy that also involved Mossad, the national intelligence agency of Israel. An Israeli Foreign Ministry spokesman referred to the allegations as "utter drivel."

Following the 2023 Hamas-led attack on Israel, the Bangladeshi Foreign Ministry swiftly condemned the loss of innocent civilian lives on both sides and expressed its endorsement of a two-state solution to the conflict. Emphasizing that the escalation of conflict benefits no party, the government of Bangladesh called on both sides to exercise maximum restraint and implement an immediate ceasefire to prevent further casualties. Information Minister Hasan Mahmud firmly stated the country's opposition to wars and killings, highlighting the unacceptable nature of holding civilians hostage during conflicts, irrespective of the location or circumstances. He specifically denounced the blockade imposed on the Gaza Strip, including the cutoff of essential resources, as an unjustifiable act in the name of war.

On 17 November 2023, Bangladesh, along with four other nations, including South Africa, jointly called for an International Criminal Court investigation into the Israeli invasion of the Gaza Strip. Bangladesh also endorsed South Africa's genocide case against Israel at the International Court of Justice over the Gaza genocide.

In 2025, the relations saw new tensions due to the interception of boat conscience carrying Bangladeshi activist Shahidul Alam, when the boat was intercepted, the Israeli authorities arrested him before deportation causing the Bangladeshi government to release a statement and take necessary actions for his deportation.

== Cultural relations ==
Bangladesh–Israel cultural relations are shaped by the absence of formal diplomatic ties and Bangladesh's consistent support for Palestine. As a Muslim-majority country, Bangladesh has never recognized Israel and bans travel there on Bangladeshi passports. Cultural interaction remains minimal, often marked by public demonstrations against Israeli policies.

== Trade ==
Bangladesh maintains a ban on trade with Israel, even though both countries are members of the World Trade Organization. In 2014, it was found from the official statistics of the Bangladesh Export Promotion Bureau that Bangladesh had exported a small amount of merchandise goods worth about US$2,577 to Israel in the 2013–14 fiscal year. In recent years, however, it has been found that Bangladeshi products are exported to Israel through the United States, the European Union, or other third countries.

Israel imported ready-made garments, apparel, and textile products from Bangladesh worth $333.74 million in the fiscal year 2022. Most imported Bangladeshi goods came via Turkey, Malaysia, the United Arab Emirates, and Singapore.

Indian company Adani Group's planned take-over of the Port of Haifa would allow Muslim countries, including Bangladesh and Saudi Arabia, to ship products to and from Haifa port despite not having a direct diplomatic relationship.

The economic potential of the two countries is immense, said Joseph Rozen, the former director for Asia and Euro-Asia affairs in the Israeli National Security Council. Israel needs goods and services that Bangladesh can offer directly, instead of obtaining the same Bangladeshi goods via Singapore and Turkey.

=== Spyware purchase ===
In February 2021, an Al-Jazeera investigation report titled "All the Prime Minister's Men" alleged that Bangladeshi military intelligence secretly bought Israeli-made mobile phone surveillance and manipulation equipment that can be used to simultaneously monitor hundreds of people. The report also claimed that some Bangladeshi military officers were trained by Israeli tech experts at a warehouse in Hungary. The Bangladesh Army denied these allegations in an official statement.

Bangladesh's security agency, the Directorate General of Forces Intelligence, commonly known as DGFI, purchased mass surveillance software, spyware, and cyber monitoring products from Israeli companies worth $12 million. Bangladeshi government security agents were trained in Hungary and Thailand. Photos appeared online showing DGFI agents posing for photos with Israeli trainers.

== See also ==
- Bangladesh–Palestine relations
- History of Jews in Bangladesh
- Foreign policy of Bangladesh
- Foreign policy of Israel
- March for Gaza
