= As-Sunnah Foundation =

Bangladeshi non-profit social organization

- আস-সুন্নাহ ফাউন্ডেশন
- Seal of the As-Sunnah Foundation
- Formation: 2017; 9 years ago
- Founder: Sheikh Ahmadullah
- Founded at: Bangladesh
- Type: NPO
- Registration no.: S-13111/2019
- Headquarters: Plot 62, 64, Road-3, Block-A, Aftab Nagar, Dhaka-1212, Bangladesh
- Chairman: Sheikh Ahmadullah
- Website: assunnahfoundation.org

The As-Sunnah Foundation (Bengali: আস-সুন্নাহ ফাউন্ডেশন) is a non-political, non-profit religious charity organization based in Bangladesh. It engages in various service activities, including education, religious outreach, and humanitarian efforts. The organization was founded in 2017 by Bangladeshi Islamic scholar Sheikh Ahmadullah, who has served as its chairman since its establishment. Under the foundation, initiatives such as the As-sunnah Skill Development Institute and the Madrasatus-sunnah program have been launched. Additionally, the foundation carries out a range of service-oriented activities, including emergency relief distribution to flood victims, clothing distribution to those affected by cold, food distribution to the hungry, and a nationwide tree-planting program.

== History ==
Shaik Ahmadullah founded the organization in 2017. After being released from the West Dammam Islamic Dawah Center in Saudi Arabia, he returned home in 2018 and began actively expanding the activities of the As-Sunnah Foundation. By the end of 2018, the organization started promoting its programs through a dedicated Facebook page.

== Activities ==
The organization received praise for its charitable work during the 2020 COVID-19 outbreak. In 2022, during the heavy floods in the Sylhet and Sunamganj regions, the foundation conducted relief efforts and also contributed to the rehabilitation activities for flood victims in Chittagong. In 2023, the foundation sent winter clothes to Türkiye during the earthquake in Syria and conducted winter clothing distribution programs in various parts of Bangladesh. The organization has planted hundreds of thousands of trees through nationwide tree plantation programs and has provided employment opportunities by purchasing tools or offering cash assistance. Amid August 2024 Bangladesh flood, the non-profit organization has set a target of donating a total of ৳1,000,000,000 (one billion taka) for the relief distribution and post-flood rehabilitation of the victims.

== Awards and honors ==
As-Sunnah Foundation received the "Climate Impact Project of the Year Award" at the Environment Innovation Summit and Award, organized by the youth environmental organization Mission Green Bangladesh and JCI Dhaka Metro. The event was held on Saturday, December 28, at the TSC Auditorium of the University of Dhaka, in recognition of the foundation's leading role in the rehabilitation of victims in South-Eastern Bangladesh following the August 2024 Bangladesh floods.
