= History of the Jews in Bangladesh =

Bangladeshi Jews বাংলাদেশী ইহুদি יְהוּדִים בַּנְגְּלָדֵשִׁים
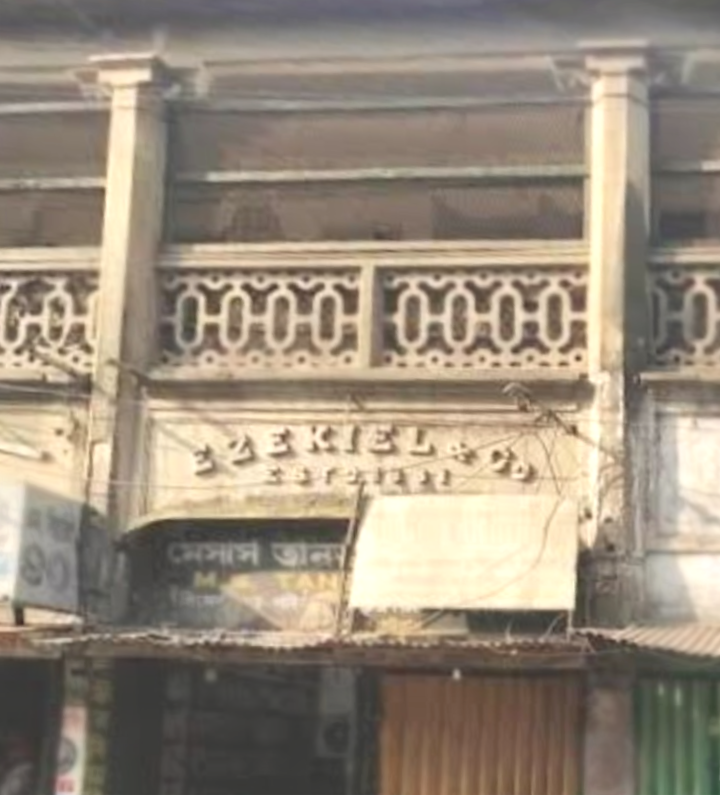
- A 140-year-old Jewish property in Chittagong, Bangladesh

Total population
- ~175–3,500

Regions with significant populations
- Dhaka · Rajshahi · Bandarban · Chittagong

Languages
- Bengali; Hebrew, Yiddish, Judeo-Urdu, Judeo-Zo

The history of the Jews in Bangladesh (formerly East Pakistan), can be traced back to the 18th and 19th centuries. The Jews of British India and Pakistan had a small community in what is now Bangladesh, particularly in the city of Dhaka.

Jews have been linked to the modern history of Bangladesh. Some of the prominent Jewish residents included Mordechai Cohen, a former television newsreader and actor; and Alex Aronson, an academic who taught at the University of Dhaka. Some foreign Jews who are prominently associated with the country include the American architect Louis Kahn, who designed Bangladesh's parliament; and J. F. R. Jacob, an Indian army general who served in the Bangladesh Liberation War. Though the interactions between Judaism and Bangladesh have historically been benign, the country underwent a wave of antisemitism following the renewal of the Israel–Palestine conflict during the Gaza war.

== History ==
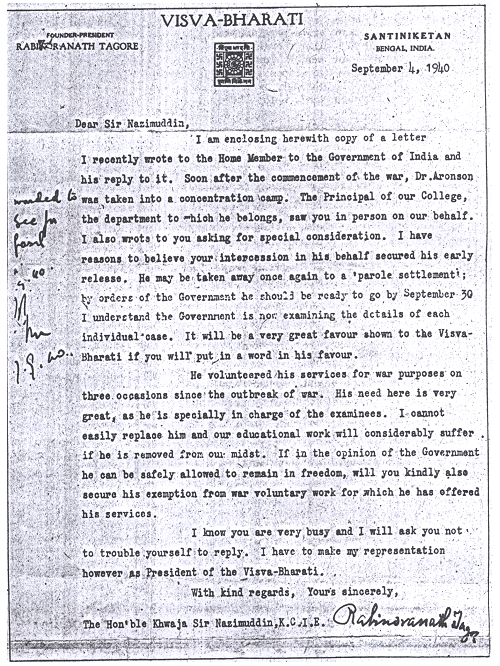
Tagore's letter to Sir Nazimuddin regarding the detention of Alex Aronson, a German Jewish academic who taught in Santiniketan and Dhaka University

Mesopotamian Jews, also known as Baghdadi Jews, settled in the cities of eastern Bengal. During the Mughal period, eastern Bengal was a hub for Eurasian merchants due to the thriving muslin trade in Bengal. Baghdadi Jewish merchants may have settled in Dhaka during the 18th-century. The region was later administered by the British Empire. A notable episode during the colonial period involved Alex Aronson, a German Jewish academic and friend of Nobel laureate Rabindranath Tagore. During the outbreak of the Second World War, Aronson was viewed as an enemy alien by the British colonial government. Despite being a Jew, he was suspected of being a spy of Axis Germany. Aronson was detained and placed under house arrest, which disrupted his work in Santiniketan University. His friend Tagore requested the British government to release him but Tagore's request was initially turned down. Tagore then secured the help of Prime Minister Khawaja Nazimuddin of Bengal to have Aronson released. After Tagore's death in 1941, Aronson began to teach in Dhaka University in the hometown of Sir Nazimuddin, a member of the Dhaka Nawab Family.

The Jews were mainly based in Kolkata of West Bengal. They managed to create a full community, built synagogues, schools, and hospital for the Jewish community, where the Jews of East Bengal, mostly migrants from Kolkata lived for commercial reasons. The Jewish population in East Bengal was only about 135 Jews at the time of the Partition of British India in 1947. Mordechai Cohen, who was born in Rajshahi, became an English and Bengali newsreader for Pakistan Television in Dacca, East Pakistan. Members of the Bene Israel community also resided in Dhaka in the 1960s. By the late 1960s, much of the Jewish community had left for Kolkata. According to historian Ziauddin Tariq Ali, a trustee of the Liberation War Museum, "There were two Jewish families in Bangladesh [after independence], but both migrated to India—one in 1973 and the other in 1975." In 2018, 4 Jews were in Dhaka. Some sources also claim that there are 175 Jews in Bangladesh, and 3,500 with Bangladeshi ancestry. Bangladesh also has a small community of the Jewish Bnei Menashe Kuki-Chin-Mizo community primarily in Bandarban district.

The Polish-American Jewish architect Louis Kahn worked in East Pakistan and post-independent Bangladesh to design the Jatiyo Sangshad Bhaban. During the Bangladesh War of Independence, Major General J. F. R. Jacob played a key role in the surrender of Pakistan. According to a record of the Jewish Telegraph Agency on 7 February 1972, it is stated that "Israel has officially recognized the new state of Bangladesh. The announcement said that Foreign Minister Abba Eban informed Bangladesh Foreign Minister Abdus Samad Azad of the recognition in a cable Friday. The recognition decision was taken after telephone consultations with all members of the Cabinet Friday instead of waiting for today’s regular Cabinet meeting. Israeli recognition was first requested last April in a letter from Acting President Nazrul Islam and Foreign Minister Mostaq Ahmad of the Bengali provisional government which was then fighting a war of secession from Pakistan".

There is no official diplomatic relationship between Bangladesh and Israel.

== See also ==
- Bangladesh–Israel relations
- Bnei Menashe
- History of the Jews in India
- History of the Jews in Pakistan
- Religion in Bangladesh
