= Argentina–Bangladesh relations =

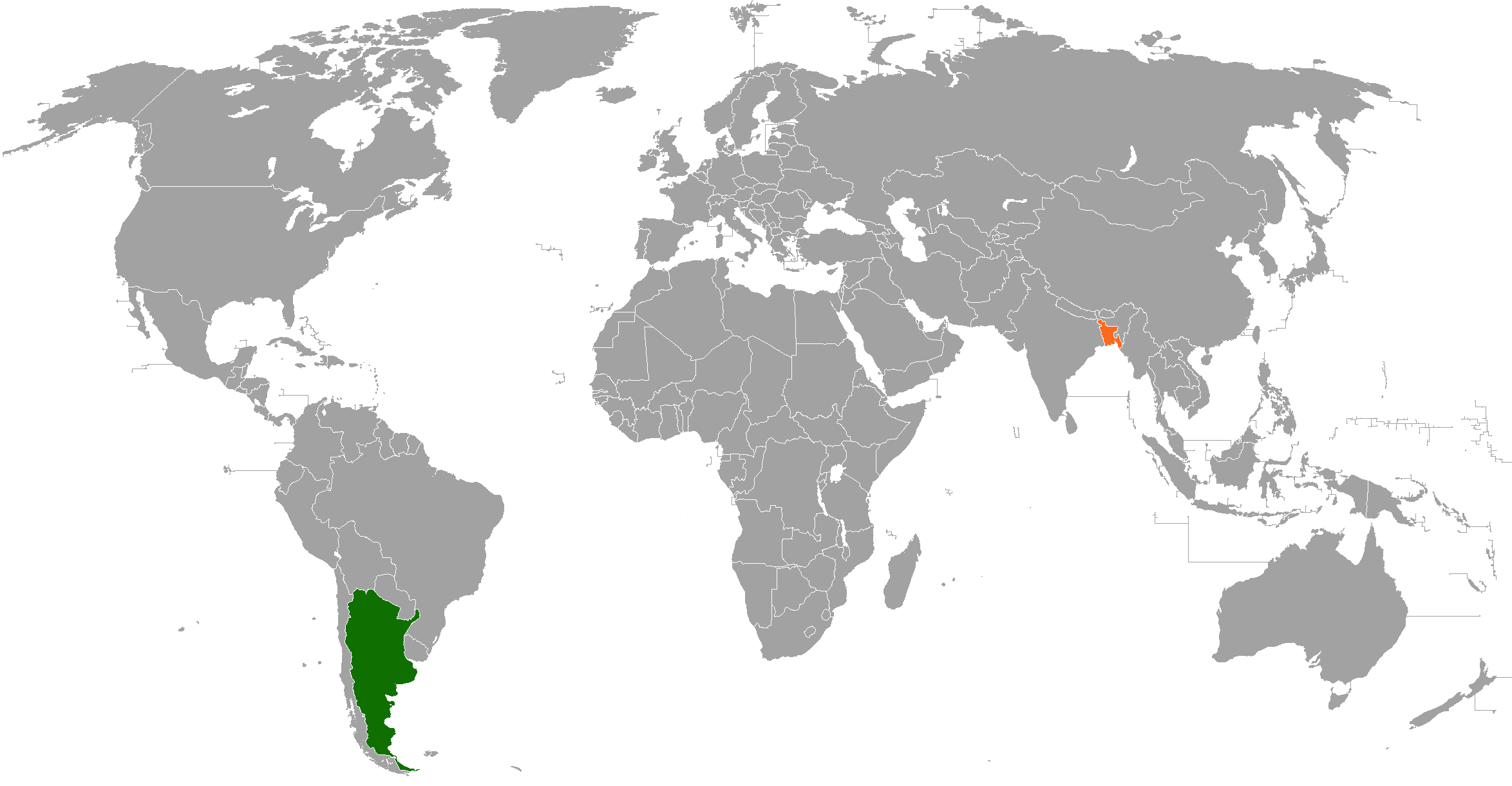

- Argentina: Bangladesh

Argentina–Bangladesh relations are the bilateral relations between the Argentine Republic and the People's Republic of Bangladesh, they have remained friendly since the establishment of diplomatic relations in 1972. Argentine writer Victoria Ocampo voiced support for the Bangladesh cause during the War of Liberation.

== History ==
Bangladesh opened a diplomatic mission in Argentina in the 1970s, but closed it in 1978. In 2008, Ernesto Carlos Alvarez was appointed as Argentine Ambassador to Bangladesh.

In 2011, former foreign secretary of Bangladesh Mohamed Mijarul Quayes paid an official visit to Buenos Aires.

In July 2022, to commemorate 50 years of diplomatic relations, the Undersecretary of Foreign Policy of Argentina, Claudio Javier Rozencwaig visited Dhaka, Bangladesh accompanied by the Argentine Ambassador to Bangladesh, Hugo Gobbi. A memorandum of understanding was signed by both parties agreeing to maintaining discussions between the respective governments. The Argentine delegation met with senior Bangladeshi officials including Minister of State for Foreign Affairs, Shahriar Alam who commended Argentine poet Victoria Ocampo for raising awareness regarding the plight of the people of Bangladesh during the Liberation War.

In December 2022, during the FIFA World Cup, Argentine Foreign Minister Santiago Cafiero announced the Argentine government's intention to reopen an embassy in Bangladesh, citing growing commercial exchange and a mutual interest in co-operation in diverse fields, including sports. In February 2023, Argentina re-opened its embassy in Dhaka.

== Trade and economic relations ==
Bangladesh and Argentina have shown interest in expanding the bilateral economic activities between the two countries. Bangladeshi ships, pharmaceuticals, ready made garments, melamine and ceramics have been identified as products with huge potential in the Argentinian market. There is a good demand in Argentina for Bangladeshi ceramics with FARR Ceramics being a major Bangladeshi ceramics exporter to Argentina.

Exports of soybean oil from Argentina to Bangladesh expanded in 2010.

== Other cooperations ==
Argentina has shown interests to conduct Spanish-language course for Bangladeshi officials. Argentina also intends to sign visa waiver agreement with Bangladesh.

== Resident diplomatic missions ==
- Argentina has an embassy in Dhaka.
- Bangladesh is accredited to Argentina from its embassy in Brasília, Brazil.

== Sports Relationship ==
In the 1997 Carlsberg ICC Trophy, Bangladesh and Argentina were placed in the same group. Bangladesh won the match against Argentina by 5 wickets.

Argentine people established a club after Bangladesh's name, the "Club Deportivo Bangladesh Argentina".

During the 2026 FIFA World Cup, the intense fandom and widespread street celebrations in Bangladesh for the Argentina national football team once again garnered significant international media attention. This unique cultural relationship and the massive watch parties across Bangladeshi cities were widely documented by global outlets, including The New York Times and The Athletic.
