= Bangladesh–United Kingdom relations =

- Bangladesh: United Kingdom

Bangladesh–United Kingdom relations are the foreign relations between Bangladesh and the United Kingdom. Both Bangladesh and the United Kingdom are members of the Commonwealth of Nations and the United Nations.

== History ==
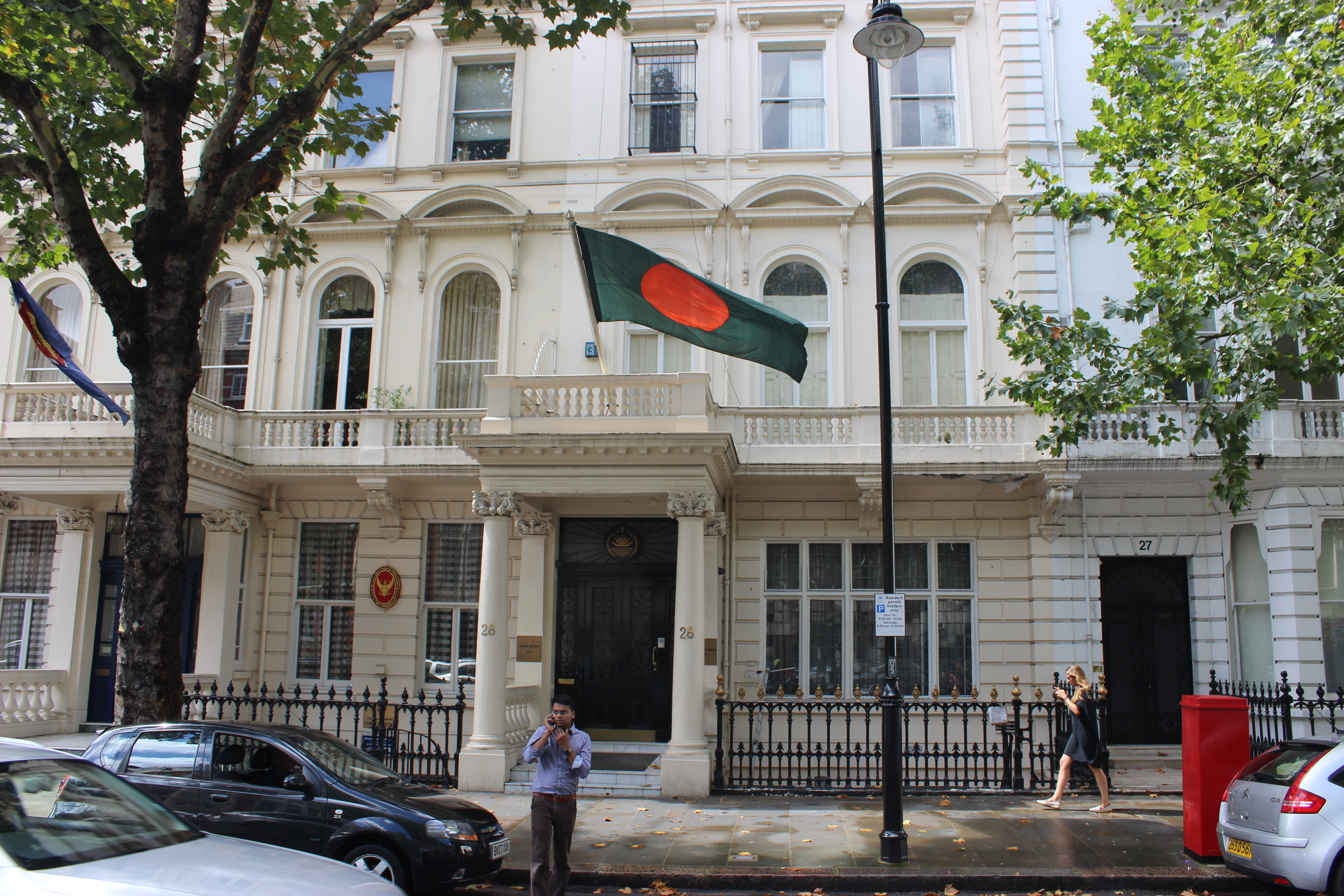
Bangladeshi High Commission in London

The ties between Britain and Bangladesh date back to the British Raj, when the region of Bengal was annexed in 1757. During the Bangladesh Liberation War Britain offered shelter to diplomats and people who escaped the conflict. The British government, politicians and media were also critical of the atrocities committed in Bangladesh and some expressed sympathy for the Mukti Bahini. On 4 February 1972 Britain recognised Bangladesh as an independent country. This led to other European and Commonwealth nations recognising the country of Bangladesh and Bangladesh's induction into the Commonwealth on 18 April 1972. Britain holds the largest 2nd Bangladeshi diaspora in the western world, now numbered at around 500,000, most of whom can trace their ties to the region of Sylhet. The largest open-air Asian festival in Europe, Baishakhi Mela, is a Bangladeshi event held in London.

In 1971, hearing Ravi Shankar's distress, former Beatles lead guitarist George Harrison helped organize the Concert for Bangladesh at Madison Square Garden. At the time, Bangladesh had been ravaged by floods, famine, and the Bangladesh Liberation War, which left 10 million people — mostly women and children to flee their homes. The Concert for Bangladesh was one of the most ambitious humanitarian efforts in rock music history, and focused global attention on the crisis in Bangladesh while raising new awareness of UNICEF and its role in the developing world.

== Modern relations ==
In March 2008, Fakhruddin Ahmed had visited Number 10 to discuss increasing British investment and cooperation in defence and trade, especially on counter-terrorism and duty-free access for LDCs. Britain is the largest foreign investor in Bangladesh and the third biggest export destination for Bangladeshi goods after USA and Germany.

At the 7th ISS Asia Security Summit (also known as Shangri-La Dialogue) in Singapore, Bangladesh's foreign advisor Iftekhar Ahmed Chowdhury met with the UK's Defence Minister Des Browne at the sidelines to discuss security and defense relations between the two countries. Browne says he hoped that Bangladesh's modernizing values can reach the Bangladeshi diaspora in the UK.

== British Bangladeshi ==
The Bangladeshi media has a significant presence in the UK. Bangladeshi channels operate 5 TV channels and over 12 Bangla and English dailies and weeklies. They attempt to raise awareness amongst the second and third generation British-Bangladeshis about Bangladesh and its culture.

== State visit ==
There has been numerous delegation visits since Foreign Secretary Alec Douglas-Home visited Bangladesh in June 1972. The first visit by a prime minister was James Callaghan in 1978. Other prime ministers who had visited Bangladesh are John Major in a 3-day visit January 10–12, 1997 and Tony Blair in 2002. Presidents and Prime Ministers of Bangladesh such as Sheikh Mujib, Ziaur Rahman and Fakhruddin Ahmed have visited the UK. Prime Minister of Bangladesh Sheikh Hasina paid an official visit to the United Kingdom on 26–30 January 2011. During the visit Hon'ble Prime Minister had bilateral talks with the British Prime Minister Rt. Hon David Cameron MP on January 27, 2011. Her Royal Highness The Princess Royal, Princess Anne, visited Bangladesh in March 2011. This was her fourth visit to Bangladesh. During the course of her visit, Princess Anne met the President, the Prime Minister, and the members of civil society.

Bangladeshi prime minister Sheikh Hasina visited UK for Girl Summit at London. More significantly, it was Hasina's first visit to any Western country after the 2014 elections. Prime Minister Hasina emphasised the Bangladesh-UK bilateral relations to explain the positive outcomes of her participation in the Girl Summit with British prime minister David Cameron.

On 10 June 2025, Chief Advisor Muhammad Yunus embarked on a visit to the UK. During the visit, he sought to secure support for recovering assets allegedly "misappropriated" by the former government. Despite emphasizing that the UK was "legally and morally" obliged to assist in the recovery of what he termed "stolen money," Yunus was not granted a meeting with the UK Prime Minister Keir Starmer, as Starmer reportedly "turned down a request to meet." Upon his arrival in London, Muhammad Yunus was met with demonstrations outside the Dorchester Hotel in Mayfair, where several British Bangladeshis, affiliated with the UK branch of the Awami League and allied organizations, gathered to protest. The demonstrators accused his interim government of human rights violations and a breakdown in law and order, and carried placards labelling him the “architect of mob rule” while calling for his resignation.

== British aid in Bangladesh ==
Bangladesh and the UK jointly organized the London Climate Change Conference held on September 10, 2008. The Conference was organized primarily to highlight Bangladesh's strategic plans to mitigate climate change affects as well as to help bolster its adaptation programmes. The London Conference also established a Multi-Donor Trust Fund for Bangladesh. The UK pledged £75 million (over five years) to support Bangladesh in adaptation program in the face of adverse impacts of climate change.

In 2009, UK development commitment was $216 million which increased to around $250 million for 2010. Lately, the Department for International Development (DFID) announced that it would spend £1 billion (equivalent to $1.66 billion) in Bangladesh for the between 2011 and 2015. It has committed to spend an average of £250 million (equivalent to $415 million) per year between 2011 and 2015. It is worthwhile to note that, despite the global financial melt-down and worldwide reduction in aid flow, UK development assistance has increased significantly. Total UK assistance to Bangladesh since independence has been around £3 billion.

== Trade and investment ==
There has been over 119% growth in bilateral trade in goods and services between 2007 and 2012. The UK exported £450 million of goods and services to Bangladesh in 2013. 71% of this was services. Exports of goods were £131 million in 2014. The UK's main exports to Bangladesh in 2013 were nuclear reactors for medical purpose, boilers, machinery and mechanical appliances / parts electrical machinery and equipment / parts; sound recorders and reproducers, television image and sound recorders and reproducers, and parts / accessories, iron and steel residues and waste from the food industries; prepared animal fodder.

The UK is the 3rd single largest destination for Bangladesh's exports, after the United States and Germany. Over the years Bangladesh's exports to the UK enjoys a steady annual growth. Total Bangladesh export to the UK in 2010-11 was US$2.001 billion, 33% higher than the previous year. Some of the major British concerns present in Bangladesh include Aventis, Berger Paints, BOC Bangladesh, British American Tobacco, Cairn Energy, Duncan Brothers, GEC, GlaxoSmithKline, GCM Energy, HSBC, James Finlay, Meghna Energy, P&O Nedlloyd, Price Waterhouse Coopers, Reckitt Benckiser, Standard Chartered, Tetley, ACI, Tullow Bangladesh, Unilever and World-Tel. United Kingdom has been one of the top sources of remittance. At present, UK is then 5th largest source of remittance. Actual flow of remittance from UK in the period 2009-2011 is $890 million.

In the 2012-13 fiscal year Bangladesh exported $2.2 billion worth of goods to UK and imported $2 billion worth goods and services from UK.

== Defence and security cooperation ==
The UK has also been a direct victim of terrorist attack during London bombings in 7/7. Bangladesh and the UK enjoy close cooperation in this particular area. Both Governments are working together to foster best possible cooperation in counter-terrorism measures. The first meeting of the Bangladesh - UK Joint Working Group (JWG) on Counter Terrorism (CT) was held in Dhaka on June 28, 2009. The concept of Joint Working Group is that of an “informal method of engagement” to facilitate dialogue between the two governments across agreed standards. The purpose of JWG is to identifying current areas of counter-terrorism cooperation and ways to enhance them, identifying new areas of CT engagement and sharing of views and experiences on best practice. The extent of Counter-terrorism cooperation includes training and information sharing.

Defence and security cooperation between Bangladesh and the UK has been warm and intense. The UK's continual support to provide all out assistance in developing and training the Bangladeshi Armed Forces is well marked. A good number of Bangladeshi Armed Forces personnel are trained in UK every year at the Sandhurst Royal Military Academy, Royal College of Defence Studies and at the Joint Defense Command Staff Courses. UK has also provided significant military and advisory assistance in setting up the prestigious Defense Services Command and Staff College and the National Defence College (NDC) of Bangladesh. British Military Assistance Team had been in Bangladesh as instructors for many years. The two Navies are also cooperating closely while most of the ships of Bangladesh Navy (BN) have been procured from Royal Navy thereby facilitating BN achieve commendable capability.

The Royal Navy has also provided technical advice in setting up important BN infrastructure such as BN Dockyard. The two armed forces have also been working closely in UN Peace-keeping missions and in the global war on terror. Exchange of high-profile military visits has also been a hallmark of defense cooperation between the two countries. This excellent cooperation is expected to grow in the future.

== See also ==
- British Bangladeshi
- History of Bangladeshis in the United Kingdom
- British Council Bangladesh
