= August 2024 Bangladesh floods =

August 2024 floods in Bangladesh

- Part of 2024 floods of Bangladesh
- Flood affected areas, worst affected areas in dark red
- Date: 21 August 2024 - present
- Location: Feni, Cumilla, Chattogram, Khagrachari, Noakhali, Moulvibazar, Habiganj, Brahmanbaria, Sylhet, Lakshmipur, and Cox's Bazar
- Cause: Excessive rainfall, landslides, and sudden water surge from upstream
- Deaths: 71
- Property damage: Tk144 billion (US$1.2 billion).
- Displaced: 502,501+
- ~5.8 million people have been affected

On August 21, 2024, heavy rainfall, coupled with a surge of water released from a dam in India's Tripura, resulted in severe flooding that affected 73 upazilas (sub-districts) and 528 unions/municipalities across 11 districts in northeastern and southeastern Bangladesh. It marks one of the worst flood events in recent history.

== Developments ==
=== 21 August ===
Cloudbursts began on the morning of 19 August, leading to prolonged and intense rainfall. The subsequent deluge, compounded by water flowing downstream, inundated the eastern region of the affected area. The cloudbursts extended over a stretch of 50 to 70 kilometers, impacting areas from Tripura in India to Cumilla and Feni in Bangladesh. These regions experienced heavy rainfall consistently from 19 to 21 August.

=== 22 August ===
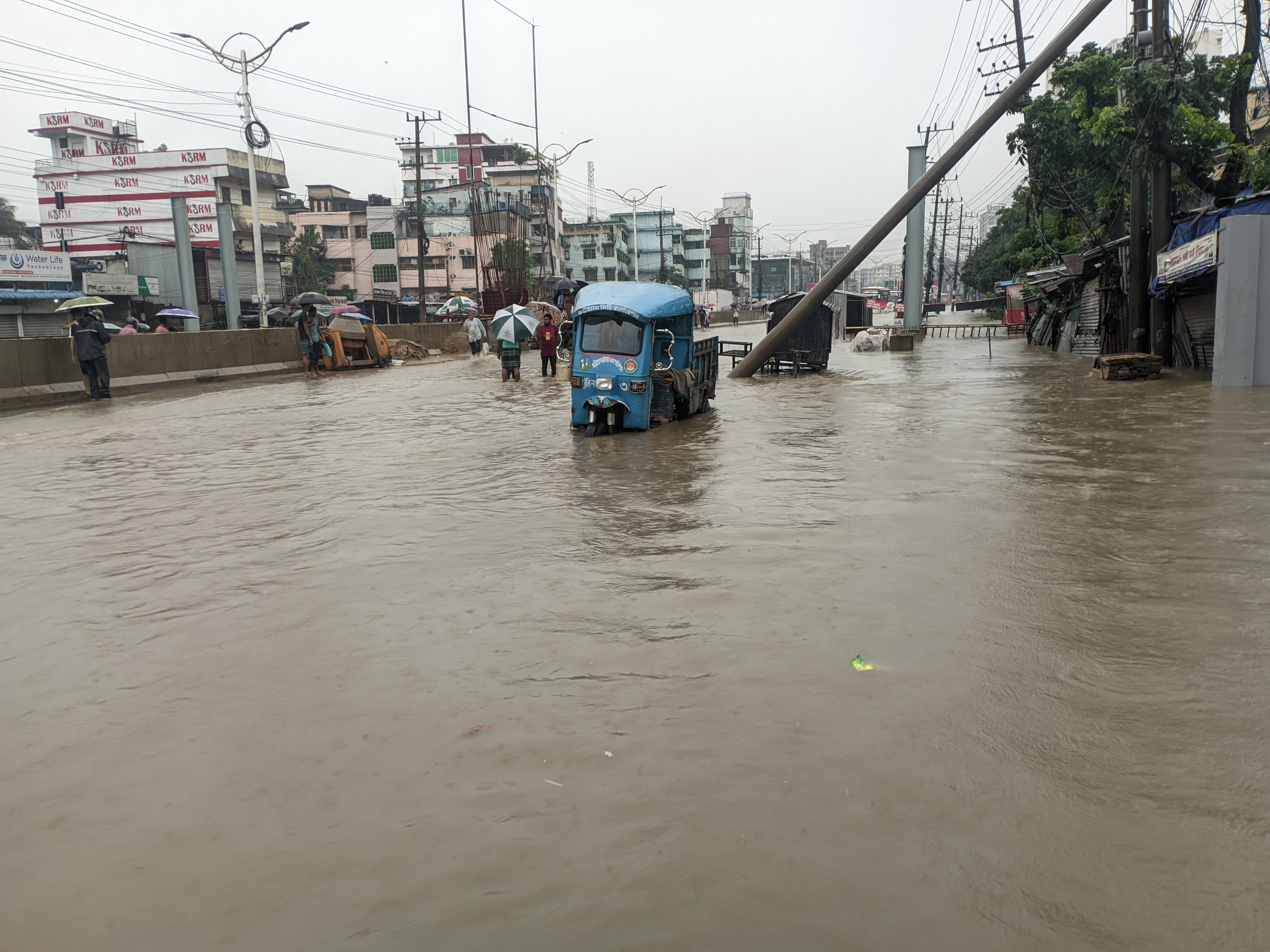
Floods in Bahaddarhat, Chittagong on August 22

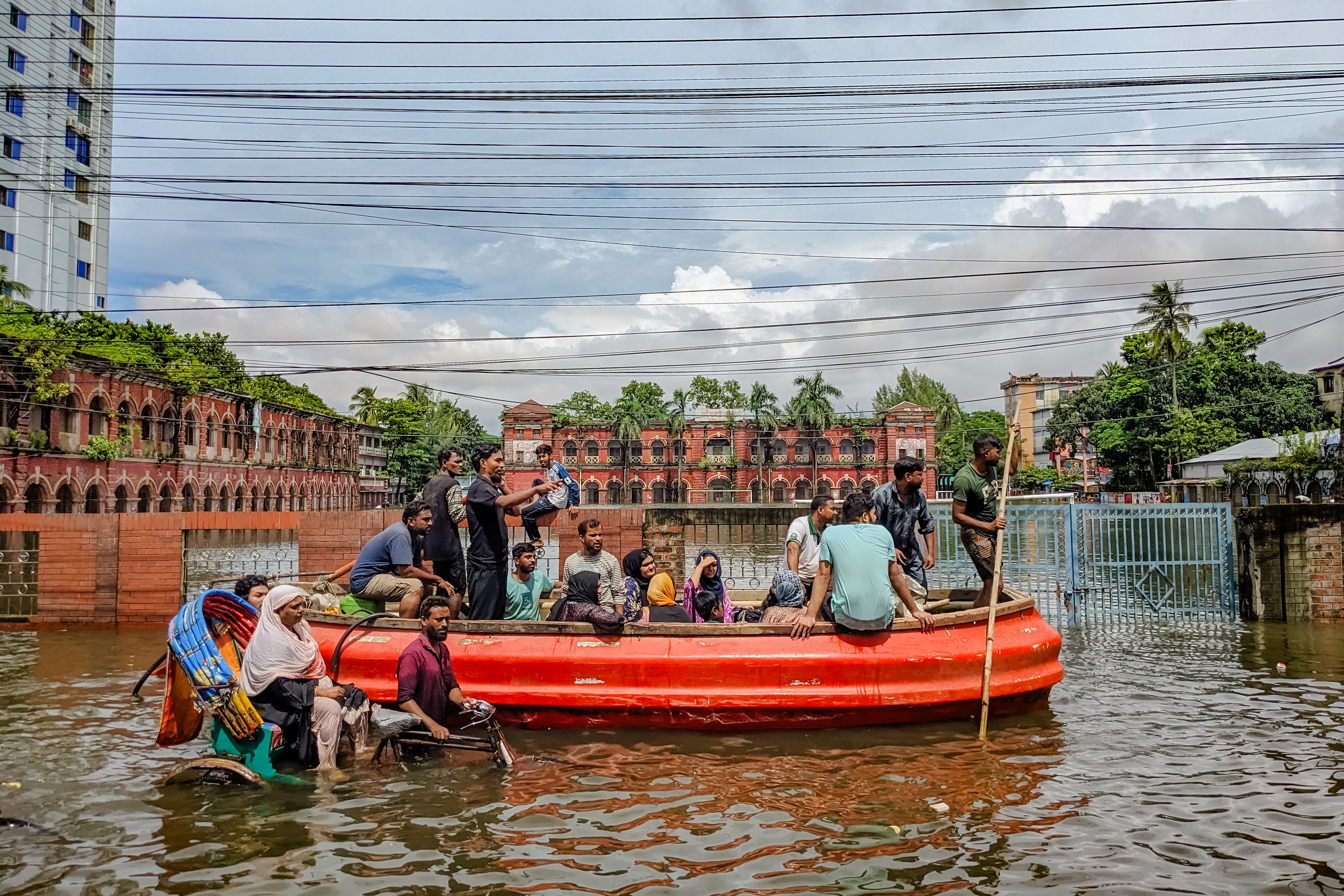
Floods in Feni District on August 23

At 6 PM, the water flow at the Dalya point was recorded at 51.50 centimeters. The danger level for this point is considered to be 52.15 centimeters. At the same time, the water flow at the Kaunia point was 28.61 centimeters, with a danger level of 29.31 centimeters. Compared to 3 PM, the water flow at this point increased by 0.7 centimeters at 6 PM.

=== 23 August ===
At 9 AM, the water level of the Gumti River at the Devi Dwara point in Comilla was measured at 8.58 meters, which is 53 centimeters above the danger level. At the same time, the river water was flowing at a height of 12.48 meters at the Comilla point. An analysis of 37 years of data from 1988 to 2024 by the Bangladesh Water Development Board (BWDB) revealed that the Gumti River had never reached such a high level.

=== 24 August ===
The Flood Forecasting and Warning Center reported that, there was no significant rainfall in the past 24 hours in India's Tripura border areas of the eastern districts of Comilla, Brahmanbaria, and Feni, as well as in the inner catchment of Tripura state. The water levels in the upstream rivers continued to recede. The flood situation in the low-lying areas of Moulvibazar, Habiganj, Feni, Cumilla, and Chattogram districts improved.

=== 25 August ===
The flood situation in Noakhali deteriorated drastically due to the upstream water from Feni. The flood situation in Lakshmipur also deteriorated. The water level was observed to have risen further by the evening.

=== 26 August ===
India opened all 109 gates of the Farakka Barrage, resulting in the release of 1.1 million cubic feet per second of water into Bangladesh in a single day. The opening of the dam also raised concerns about further flooding in Murshidabad district of West Bengal, India.

=== 27 August ===
The flooding situation in Lakshmipur deteriorated again due to continuous rain starting in the evening. Floods in Mirsharai, Chattogram, began receding. However, some localities in Dagonbhuj and Sonagazi upazilas remained inundated. Faruk Ahmed, the advisor on disaster management and relief, stated that no new areas had been inundated even after the Farakka barrage gates were opened.

=== 28 August ===
Floodwaters in Monohorganj, Comilla, continued to rise. Floodwaters in eight upazilas and seven municipalities of Noakhali continued to rise because of flows from Feni due to continuous heavy rainfall. Water levels also rose in Sadar, Kabirhat, Companiganj, Begumganj, Senbagh, Sonaimuri, Chatkhil and Sonaimuri upazilas.

=== 29 August ===
Following the cessation of rainfall, three to eight inches of water decreased in the previous 24 hours across all the upazilas of Noakhali. At that rate, it was estimated that the floodwaters would take about one week to recede fully.

== Cause ==
Experts believe that the sudden heavy rainfall caused by a low-pressure area in the Bay of Bengal, coupled with upstream water from transboundary rivers, led to the flood situation in the country. Simultaneously, the opening of the dam of the Dumbur Hydroelectric Project in the Indian state of Tripura is also attributed to the flood. Although Indian media reported this, the Indian government later denied it. Bangladeshi locals accused India of releasing water from the Dumbur dam with no warning.

== Casualties ==
On 3 September 2024, the reported fatalities included 45 men, 19 children, and seven women. The highest number of deaths occurred in Feni, with 28 fatalities. In addition, 19 people died in Comilla, 11 in Noakhali, six in Chattogram, and three in Cox's Bazar. There was one death each in Khagrachari, Brahmanbaria, Lakshmipur, and Moulvibazar. This brought the total death toll from the floods to 71.

== Impact ==
According to the National Disaster Response Coordination Center (NDRCC), approximately 5.8 million people in the northeastern and southeastern regions have been affected by recent flooding, with over 1 million individuals currently isolated in flood-impacted communities. As a result, 502,501 people have been displaced and are residing in 3,403 evacuation shelters.

The districts most severely impacted include Noakhali, Cumilla, Laxipur, Feni, Chattogram, and Moulvibazar. The flooding has submerged rural roads, agricultural fields, and fishponds, disrupting essential access and severely impacting local livelihoods. The disaster has affected an estimated 296,852 hectares of crops. Total damage estimated by the Centre for Policy Dialogue reached Tk144 billion (US$1.2 billion).

== Flood inundation areas in Feni district ==
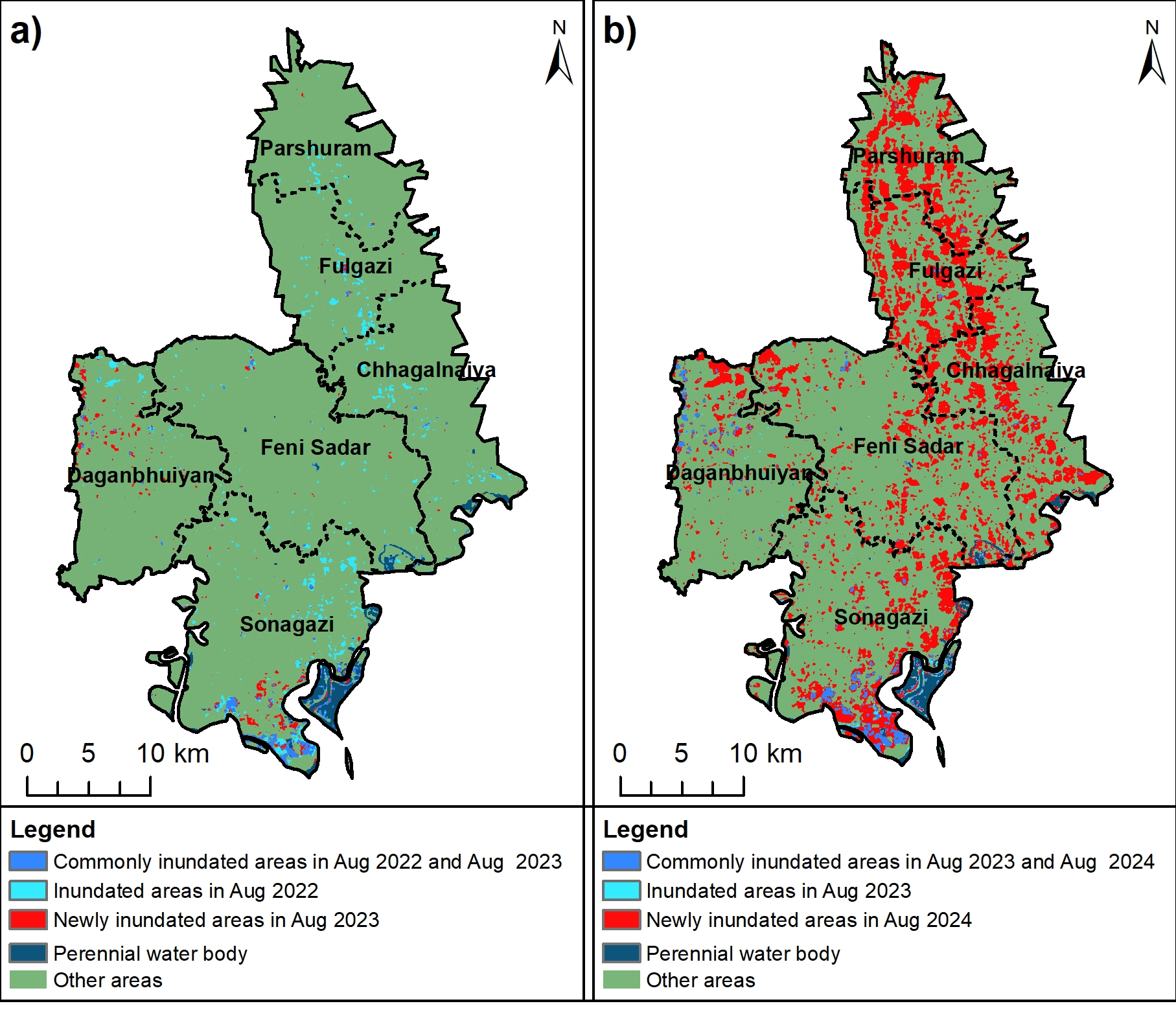
The flood patterns in Feni, Bangladesh, highlighting the spatial changes that occurred between the years 2022 and 2023 and 2023 and 2024 both in terms of the recession and rise of the floods.

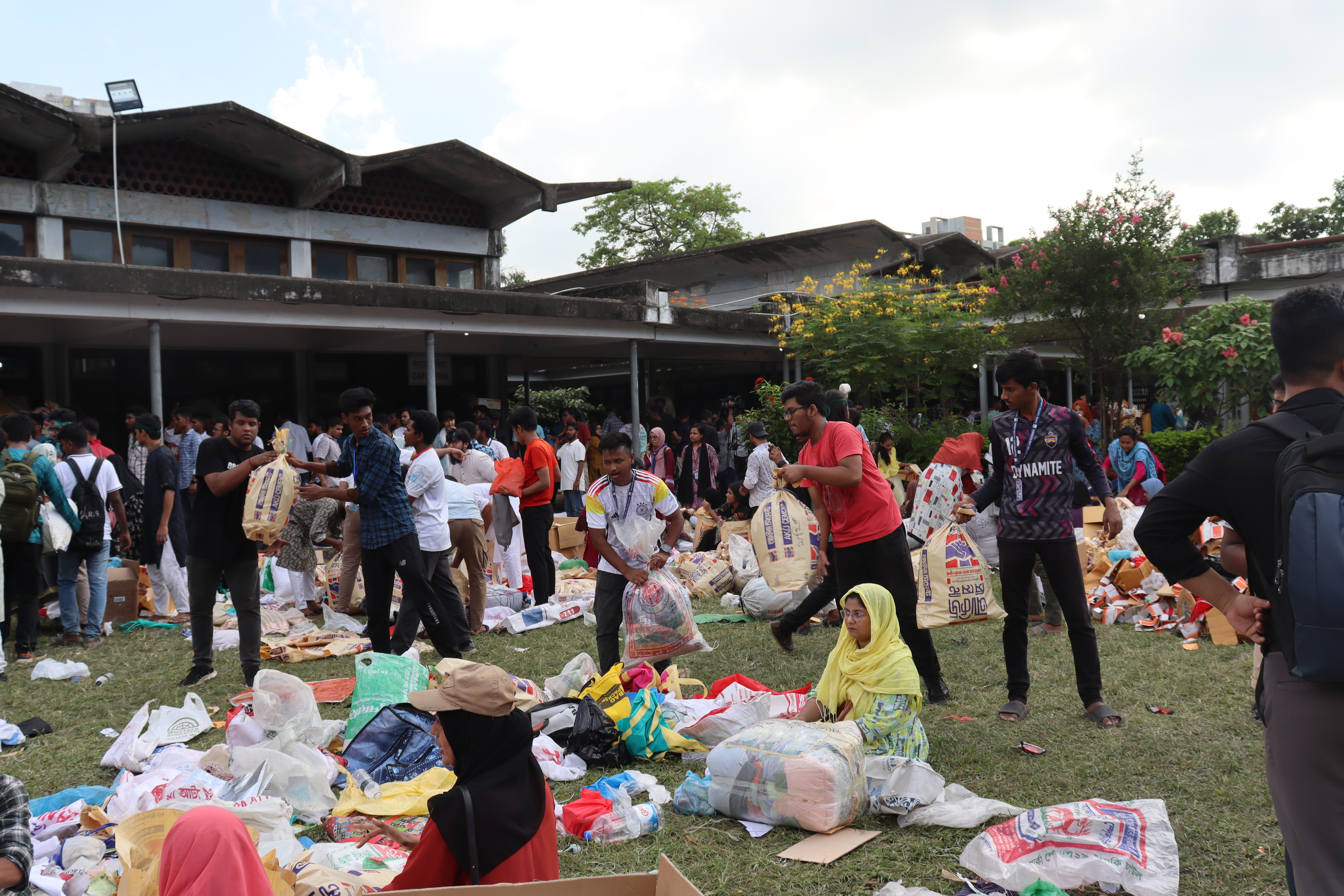
Relief collecting for those affected by the floods

Study-based flood inundation maps for August 2022, 2023, and 2024 are shown. Flooded areas in Feni District increased significantly from 2022 to 2024. The flood inundation area dropped from 27 km² in 2022 to 17 km² in 2023. A catastrophic flood flooded 201 km² in 2024. In 2024, Sonagazi was the most inundated area, covering 49 km², followed by Chhagalnaiya (37 km²), Fulgazi (35 km²), and Feni Sadar (33 km²). The lowest flooding occurred in Daganbhuiyan (16 km²) and Parshuram (31 km²). Flood severity in 2024 indicates growing vulnerability, requiring immediate flood mitigation, adaptive land-use strategies, and upstream discharge data flood forecasting.

In August 2023, 8 km² of new land was flooded, increasing the flood extent. Sonagazi was the most flood-prone Upazila, with 7 km² commonly flooded and 4 km² newly inundated in 2023. Flood-prone areas in Fulgazi and Chhagalnaiya have changed, with 3 square kilometres freshly affected. Daganbhuiyan saw a 3 km² increase in new inundations, while Parshuram saw little change. Flooding in Feni, Bangladesh, increased significantly between August 2023 and August 2024. Sonagazi Upazila experiences the most widespread and persistent flooding, covering an area of 90.72 km², followed by Daganbhuiyan (34.03 km²) and Feni Sadar (9.12 km²). Sonagazi (4.53 km²) and Feni Sadar (1.12 km²) experienced moderate increases in flooding in August 2023, while most districts saw slight increases.

== Domestic reactions ==
Nahid Islam, an advisor to the interim government, said that India had deliberately released water by opening the dam's gates without prior notice showcasing their inhumanity and non-cooperation with Bangladesh. Left Democratic Alliance leaders accused India of violating international law by opening dams without prior warning. According to international law, an upstream country is supposed to inform a downstream country 72 hours before opening the gates of a dam. However, the Dumbur and Kalsi dams were opened without any prior warning. The Indian High Commissioner to Bangladesh, Pranay Kumar Verma, claimed that the Dumbur dam in India opened automatically, not intentionally. Bangladesh Nationalist Party Standing Committee member Hafizuddin Ahmed said that "India, by unjustly constructing dams on common rivers, has obstructed the natural flow of water. This, he argues, is the reason why people in the country are suffering from floods."

== International responses ==
- China provided a US$20,000 grant to assist those affected by the floods through its Ambassador Yao Wen, who handed over the grant check during a courtesy call on Professor Muhammad Yunus, the chief advisor to the interim government. Yao then added that the Chinese Red Cross would also provide US$100,000 in humanitarian assistance.
- The Ministry of External Affairs of India issued a press release stating that the flood situation in Bangladesh was not caused by the release of water from Indian dams on the Gumti River in Tripura. On 21 August, Zee 24 Ghanta, a mainstream Indian media outlet, published a report with a headline that read, 'India releases water! Bangladesh is drowning with a desperate plea...' This headline sparked widespread criticism on social media leading to Zee's website being defaced by Bangladeshi hacktivists. Later, Zee changed the headline to, 'India releases water, Bangladesh is flooded.
- (Pakistan) Prime Minister Shehbaz Sharif expressed deep concern over the loss of life and destruction caused by the floods and expressed his condolences and solidarity with Bangladesh.
- President Recep Tayyip Erdoğan expressed his sorrow for the disaster in Bangladesh and noted that Turkey would stand by the Bangladeshi people. Erdoğan said Turkey would provide humanitarian aid.
- (United Kingdom) The UK government announced an additional £450,000 (approximately Tk 7 crore) in humanitarian aid to support over 36,000 individuals affected by the floods. This new funding supplements £33,000 (approximately Tk 5.2 lakh) in emergency relief that was previously allocated on August 26. The additional £450,000 (approximately Tk 7 crore) in humanitarian aid brings the UK's total support for disaster preparedness and response in 2024 to over £1,500,000 (approximately Tk 23.4 crore).
- Palestine's Ambassador to Bangladesh Yousef S.Y. Ramadan delivered relief goods to As-Sunnah Foundation, a non-profit organization in Bangladesh. In his remarks, Ramadan conveyed his sympathies to the Bangladeshi people, stating, “Bangladesh and Palestine share historical ties, and we wish to stand by them in times of crisis.” He also acknowledged Bangladesh's strong support for the Palestinian cause.
- Acting Australian High Commissioner to Bangladesh Nardia Simpson announced that Australia will donate A$1 million to a charity supporting flood-affected communities in Bangladesh.
