= Shaykh Ahmadullah =

Bangladeshi Islamic figure, negotiator and social activist

- আহমাদুল্লাহ
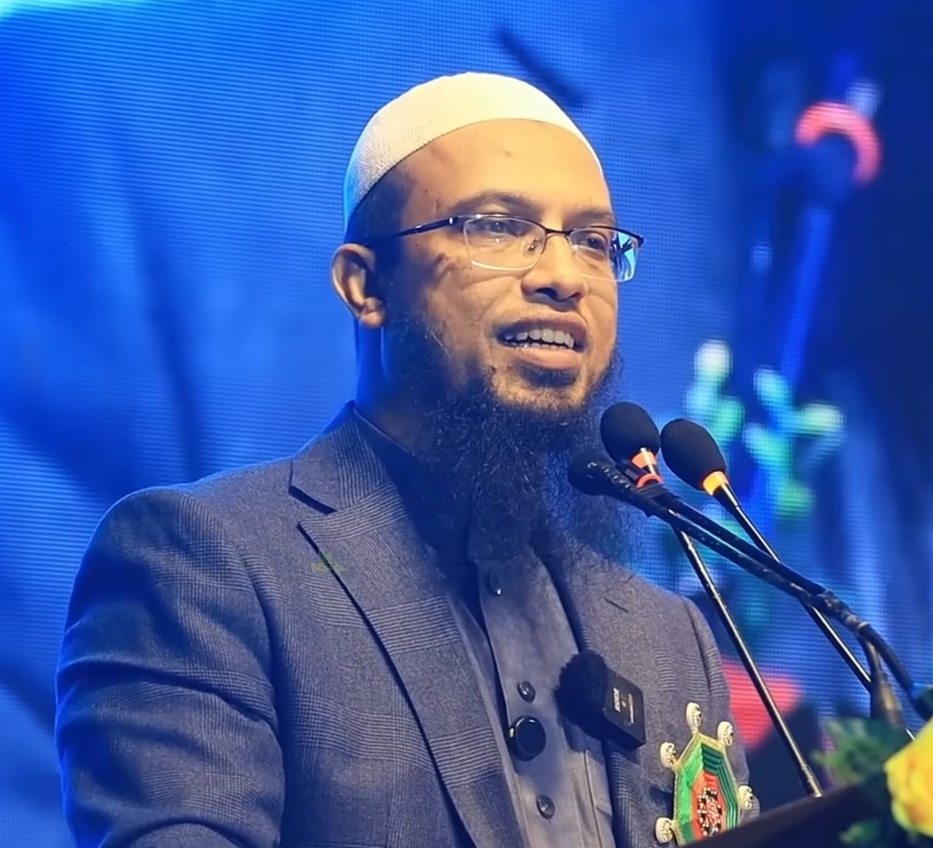
- Ahmadullah in DUET

Personal life
- Born: Ahmadullah; 15 December 1981 (age 44) Bashikpur village, Sadar, Lakshmipur District
- Children: 3 son, 1 daughter
- Parents: Muhammad Delwar Hussain (father); Mosammat Delwara Begum (mother)
- Era: Modern Era
- Main interests: Tafsir; Hadith; Fiqh
- Notable work(s): As-Sunnah Foundation, IQA.info
- Education: Darul Uloom Hathazari
- Website: Official website

Religious life
- Religion: Sunni Islam
- Denomination: Sunni
- Jurisprudence: Hanafi
- Creed: Athari

Senior posting
- Influenced by: Khandaker Abdullah Jahangir

YouTube information
- Channel: Ahmadullah
- Subscribers: 3.33 million
- Views: 368 million
- Last updated: November 30, 2025

Ahmadullah, better known as Shaykh Ahmadullah (Bengali: শায়খ আহমাদুল্লাহ, Arabic: الشيخ أحمد الله), is a Bangladeshi Islamic scholar, jurist, and social activist. He founded and serves as chairman of the As Sunnah Foundation. He has participated in the invitation work of various international programs including Japan, India and the United Arab Emirates. He also founded IQA.info, an Islamic question and answer website. He was the khatib (preacher) of Bhumipalli Jame Mosque, Narayanganj. In the aftermath of the July 2024 mass uprising, during the lead-up to the formation of the interim government in August, he was offered the position of advisor to the Ministry of Religious Affairs, but he declined to accept it.He is currently the Khatib of As Sunnah Foundation Masjid Complex and Islamic Center, Badda Thana.

== Early life ==
Ahmadullah was born on December 15, 1981, in Bashikpur village of Sadar Upazila of Lakshmipur District. His father is Muhammad Delwar Hussain and his mother is Mosammat Delwara Begum. Ahmadullah's father was a businessman. He was the second of six siblings. Ahmadullah himself has three sons and a daughter.

== Education ==
He completed his primary education at Bashikpur Primary School. He then enrolled in a Qawmi madrasa. After studying for several years at multiple madrasas in Noakhali, he joined the Faizul Uloom Madrasa in Hatiya. There, he had the opportunity to study under the esteemed Islamic scholar Mufti Saiful Islam. He subsequently enrolled in the country's largest Islamic educational institution, Darul Uloom Hathazari Madrasa. From the Qawmi Madrasa Education Board (Wifaq), he achieved tenth place in the (Sanubiyya) higher secondary examination, third place in the (Fazilat) bachelor's examination, and in 2001, he secured second place in the combined merit list of Dawra-e-Hadith. After completing Dawra-e-Hadith, he completed his Ifta studies at Khulna Darul Uloom.

When the Hatiya region was damaged by the 1988 floods, Ahmadullah left Noakhali and joined Darul Uloom Hathazari in Chittagong. In this madrasa he was a disciple of Mufti Shahidullah. He was also a classmate of Zakaria Abdullah and Anas Madani in this madrasah.

== Career ==
After completing his education, he joined Darur Rashad Mirpur Qaumi Madrasa as a teacher in 2003, while serving as Imam and Khatib at Baitul Falah Jame Masjid in nearby Mirpur. He left Dhaka in 2009 and traveled to Saudi Arabia and joined West Dammam Islami Dawah Centre under the Ministry of Religion as a translator and preacher. After working there for 10 years, he returned to Bangladesh on the advice of Khandaker Abdullah Jahangir. After coming to the country, he established a charitable organization called As-Sunnah Foundation. He is also serving as the chairman of As-Sunnah Foundation and also as Khatib of Bhumipalli Jame Masjid in Narayanganj.

== Controversy ==
On 5 April 2026, the Australian Department of Home Affairs cancelled the visa of Ahmadullah, halting his national speaking tour, "A Legacy of Faith." The revocation took place following public backlash and reports in The Daily Telegraph highlighting past video lectures in which he made antisemitic remarks.

== Bibliography ==
In addition to discussing Islam on YouTube, he has written articles and books in newspapers and magazines. His book Dua and Zikr of the Messenger of Allah (PBUH) has been distributed free of charge in more than 300,000 copies. Besides, he has written hundreds of articles on Dawah and research in Bengali and Arabic languages.

List of books written by him:

- Morning and Evening Dua and Zikr of the Messenger of Allah (PBUH)
- How to do Umrah?
- Ramadan Planner
- Seerat Sarok-2021

== Honors ==
- As-Sunnah Foundation Young Entrepreneur Award-2021.
- Boiferi Bestseller Award-2022 (Religious Category).

== See also ==
- Khandaker Abdullah Jahangir
- Abubakar Muhammad Zakaria
