= Embassy of France, Dhaka =

Embassy of France in Dhaka
- Location: Baridhara, Dhaka
- Address: 11 Felani Ave, Dhaka 1212
- Ambassador: Mr Jean-Marc SERE-CHARLET
- Jurisdiction: Bangladesh
- Website: www.bd.diplomatie.gouv.fr/en/embassy-france-dhaka

The Embassy of France in Dhaka is the diplomatic mission of France in Bangladesh.

The embassy is located at Felani Avenue, in Dhaka.

== History ==
The Embassy of France officially opened in 1972 after the recognition of Bangladesh by the France government. It was in Gulshan, a neighborhood of Dhaka. Later it moved to current position at Baridhara in May 2017 as joint premises with German Embassy.
