= Embassy of Argentina, Dhaka =

Embassy

Embassy of Argentina, Dhaka, Bangladesh
- Location: Dhaka, Bangladesh
- Address: Banani, Dhaka
- Coordinates: 23.79418°N 90.40659°E
- Opened: 1972 (Note: closed between 1978-2023)

The Embassy of Argentina in Dhaka is the diplomatic mission of the Argentine Republic to the People's Republic of Bangladesh. It is located in the Banani neighborhood of Dhaka.

== History ==
Argentina recognized the People's Republic of Bangladesh in 1972, subsequently establishing diplomatic ties with one another. An embassy was later inaugurated in Dhaka. However, in 1978, the military junta which ruled Argentina at the time closed the embassy. As a result, the Argentine embassy in New Delhi in neighboring India was accredited to Bangladesh.

Due to the overwhelming support for the Argentina national football team during the 2022 FIFA World Cup held in Qatar, the Foreign Minister of Argentina, Santiago Cafiero, announced plans to reopen the embassy. The move was also made to enhance relations and trade between the two countries. The embassy was officially reopened by Cafiero and Bangladesh's State Minister of Foreign Affairs, Shahriar Alam, on 27 February 2023.

== See also ==
- Argentina–Bangladesh relations
