= Embassy of Palestine, Dhaka =

Embassy of the State of Palestine in Bangladesh سفارة دولة فلسطين لدى بنغلاديش
- Location: Dhaka
- Address: Plot-1, Dutabash road, Block-k, Baridhara, Dhaka-1212
- Opened: 1976 (representative office); 1988 (embassy)
- Ambassador: Yousef S. Y. Ramadan
- Website: palestinemissionbd.com

The Embassy of the State of Palestine in Bangladesh (Arabic: سفارة دولة فلسطين لدى بنغلاديش) is the diplomatic mission of the State of Palestine in Bangladesh. It is located in Dhaka.

== History ==
Before the independence of Bangladesh, there was a Palestinian consulate in Dhaka. After independence, an office of the Palestine Liberation Organization was established in Dhaka at the end of 1976. After the Palestinian declaration of independence in 1988, the office gained the status of an embassy.

== List of ambassadors/representatives ==
No.	Name	Name in Arabic	Appointment	Dismissal	Remarks
1	Essam Besiso	عصام بسيسو	1977	1979	
2	Ahmed Abdul Razeq	أحمد عبد الرازق	1980	1985	
3	Mohammad Shahta Zarab	محمد شحتى زعرب	1986	2005	
4	Shaher M. Abuiyyadeh	شاهر محمد أبو عيادة	2006	2015	
5	Yousef S. Y. Ramadan	يوسف صالح يوسف رمضان	2016	incumbent	

== See also ==
- Bangladesh–Palestine relations
- List of diplomatic missions in Bangladesh
- List of diplomatic missions of Palestine
