= List of alumni of Notre Dame College, Dhaka =

This list of alumni of Notre Dame College, includes notable graduates, non-graduate former students and current students of Notre Dame College, Dhaka, Bangladesh.

== Academia and research ==
=== Educators ===
Name	Class year	Notability	Reference(s)
Serajul Islam Choudhury	1952	Professor emeritus at University of Dhaka	
Abul Kalam Azad Chowdhury	1962 (did not graduate)	Former Vice-Chancellor of University of Dhaka	
Ahmed Shafee		Former Vice-Chancellor of East West University	
Ainun Nishat	1964 (11th grade)	Former Vice-Chancellor of BRAC University	
Anwarul Azim Akhand	1982	Vice-Chancellor of Mawlana Bhashani Science and Technology University	
Anwarul Kabir		Former Vice-Chancellor of State University of Bangladesh	
AZM Mostaq Hossain		Vice-Chancellor of Rajshahi Medical University	
Benjamin Costa	1964	Former Vice-Chancellor of Notre Dame University Bangladesh	
Chowdhury Mofizur Rahman	1982	Former Vice-Chancellor of United International University	
Ghyasuddin Ahmed	1952	Former lecturer at University of Dhaka	
Kamrul Hasan Khan	1974	Former Vice-Chancellor of Bangladesh Medical University	
Md Sayedur Rahman	1978	Vice-Chancellor of Bangladesh Medical University	
Mohammad Mahfuzul Islam	1990	Vice-Chancellor of University of Frontier Technology, Bangladesh	
Md. Mashiur Rahman	1990	Former Vice-Chancellor of National University, Bangladesh	
Lutfur Rahman (academic)	1992	Vice-Chancellor of Chittagong Veterinary and Animal Sciences University	
Aasif Ridwan Khan	1993	Bangladeshi architect who is well-known for Eco-friendly & sustainable Architecture List of Bangladeshi architects	
Mohammad Raknuzzaman	1994	Vice-Chancellor of Jamalpur Science and Technology University	
M. Badruzzaman Bhuiyan	1998	Former Vice-Chancellor of University of Barishal	
Mesbahuddin Ahmed (physicist)	1964	Former Vice-Chancellor of Jagannath University, chairman of Bangladesh Accreditation Council	
Mohammed Omar Ejaz Rahman	1975	Former Vice-Chancellor of Independent University Bangladesh	
Muhammad Fazli Ilahi		Former Vice-Chancellor of Ahsanullah University of Science and Technology	
Murshed Ahmed Chowdhury	1977	Former Vice-Chancellor of Sylhet Medical University	
Rezaul Karim (urban planner)	1977	Vice-Chancellor of University of Khulna	

=== Scientists, inventors and researchers ===
Name	Class year	Notability	Reference(s)
Abed Chaudhury	1974	Geneticist	
Mirza Mofazzal Islam	1983	Agronomist, Director General of BINA	
Tahmeed Ahmed		Executive director of ICDDR,B	

== Architecture ==
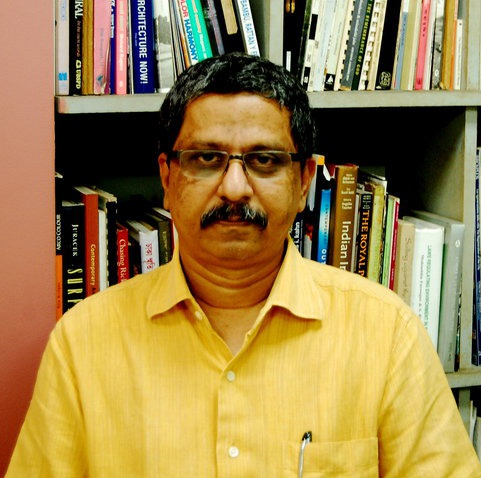
Jalal Ahmad

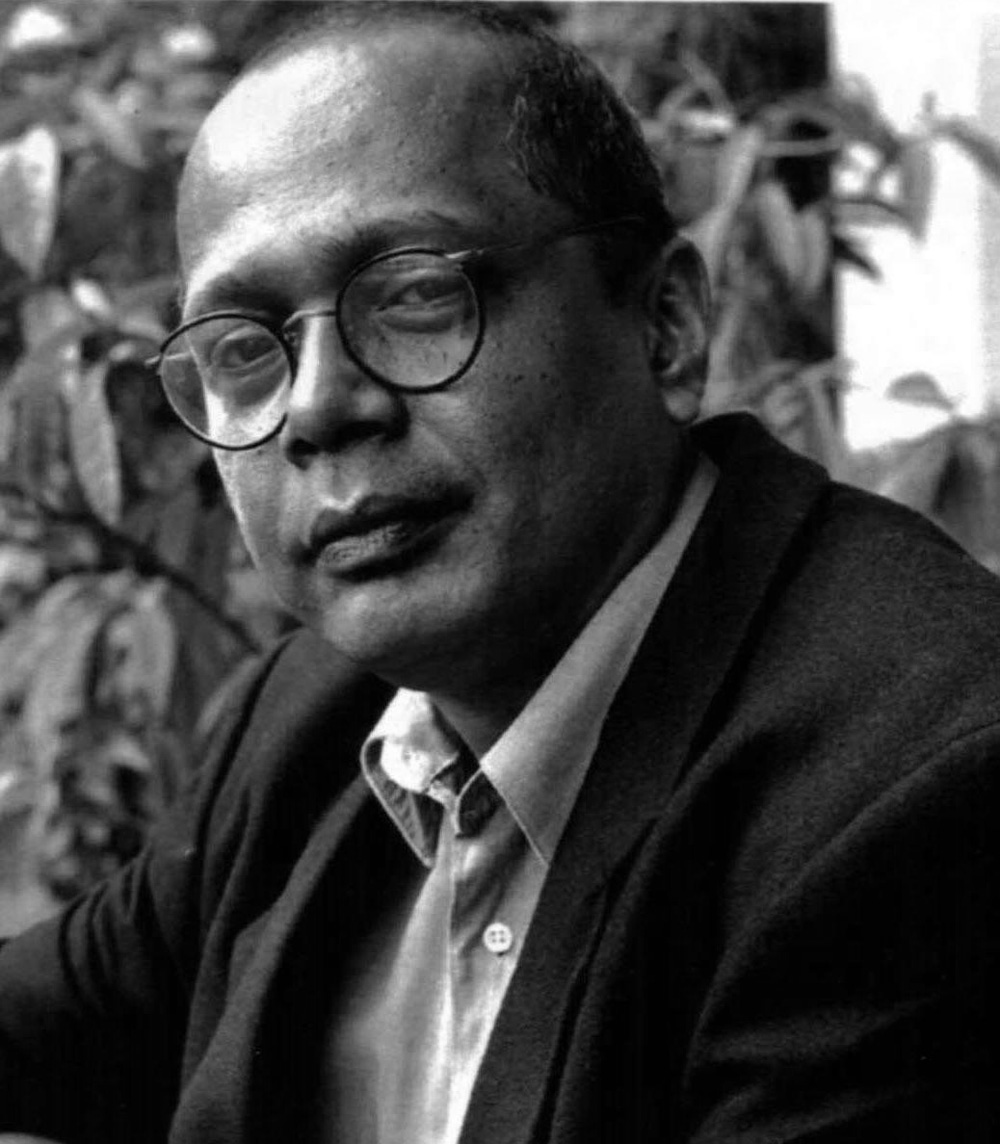
Saif Ul Haque

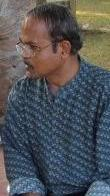
Saleh Uddin

Name	Class year	Notability	Reference(s)
Jalal Ahmad	1977	Architect	
Saif Ul Haque	1977	Architect	
Saleh Uddin		Architect	

== Government and law ==
=== Politicians ===
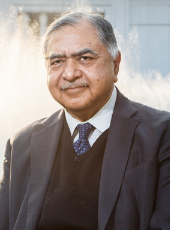
Kamal Hossain

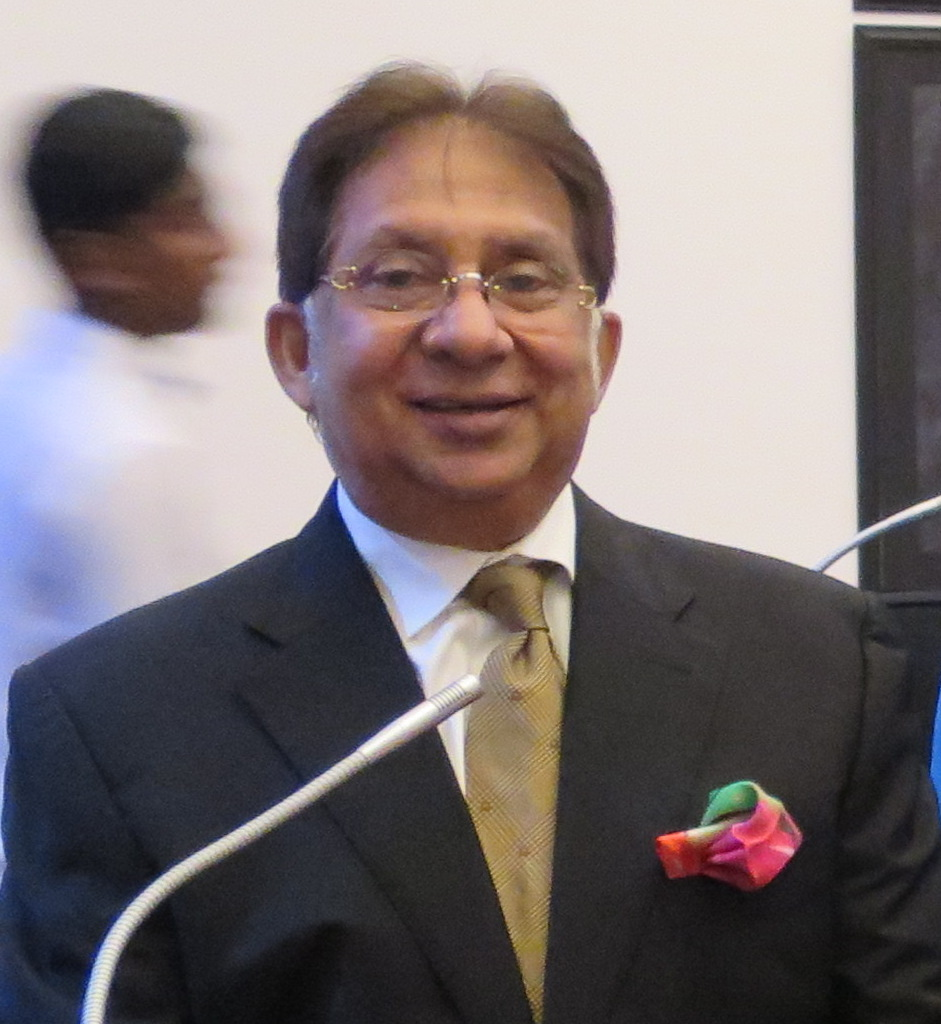
Shamsher M. Chowdhury

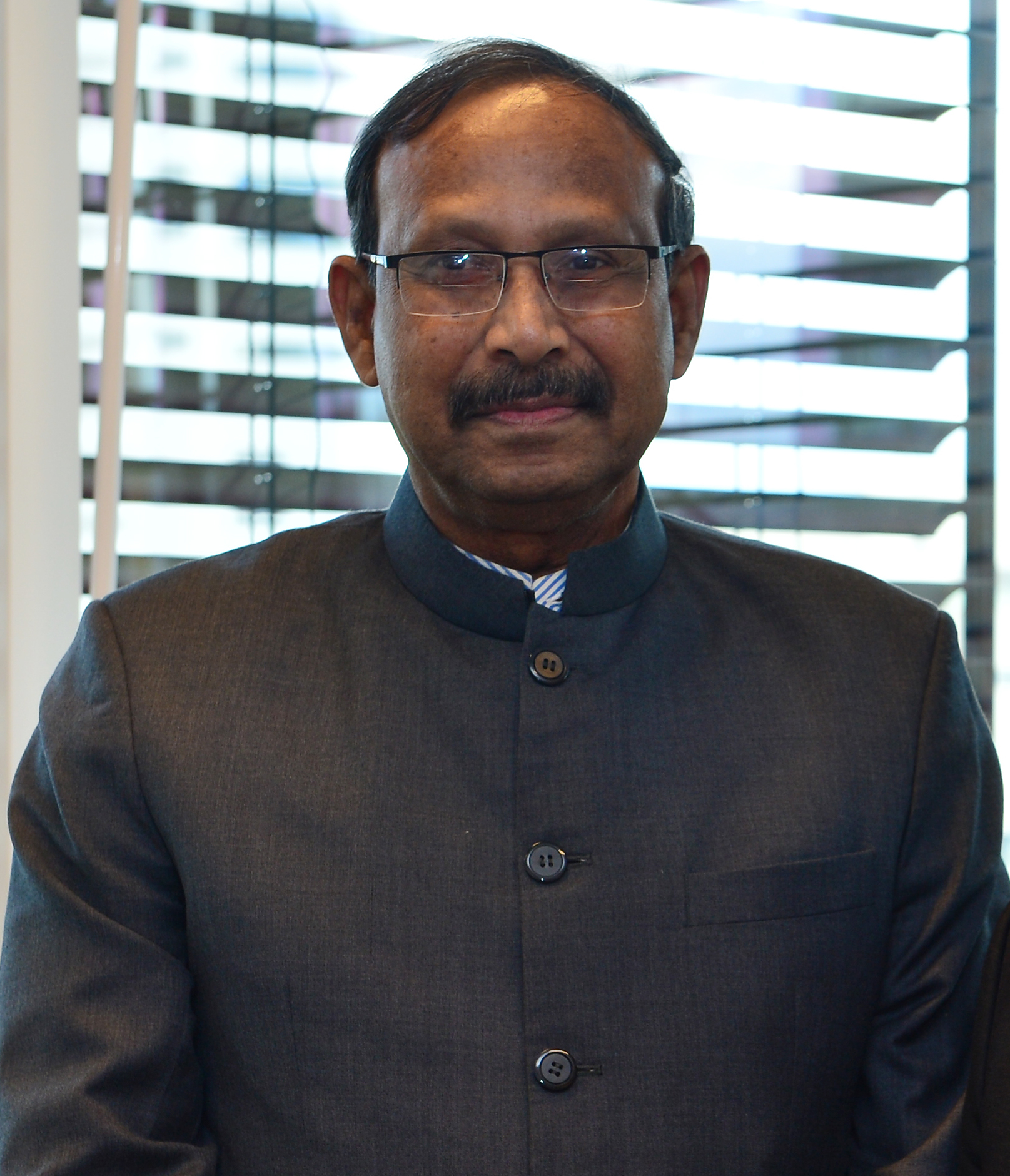
Yeafesh Osman

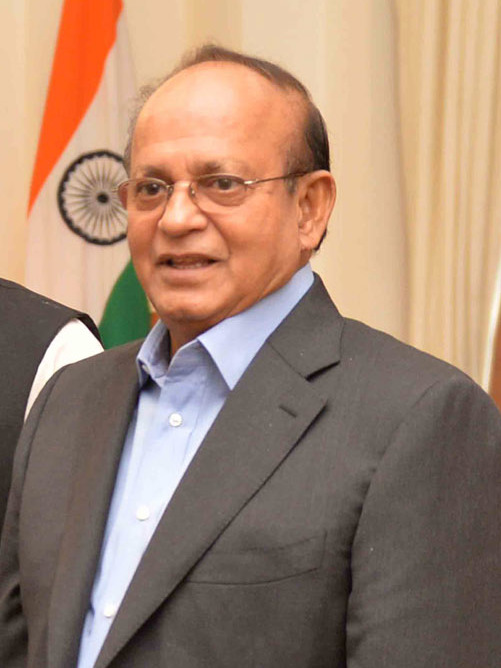
Anwar Hossain Manju

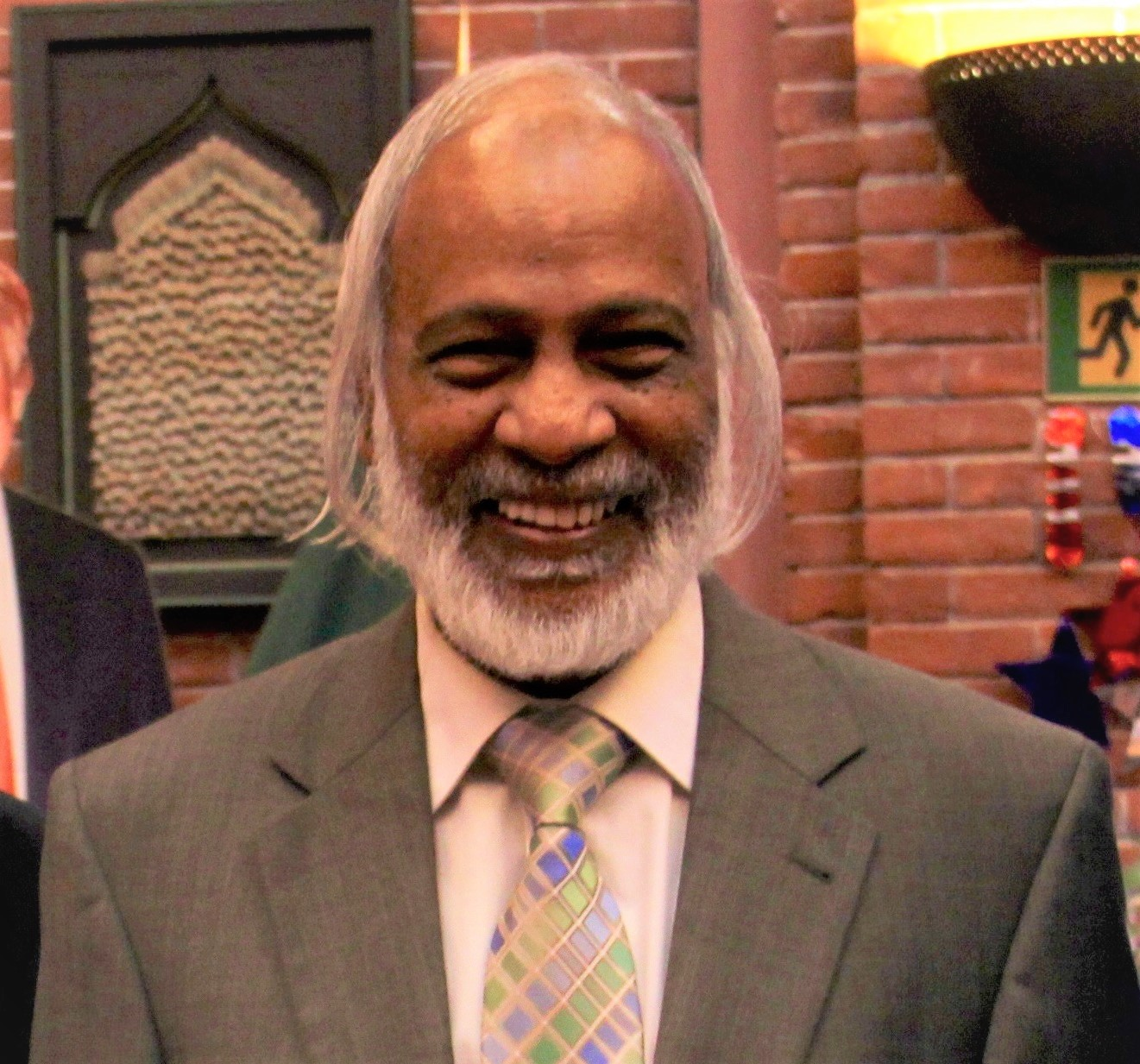
Abdul Moyeen Khan

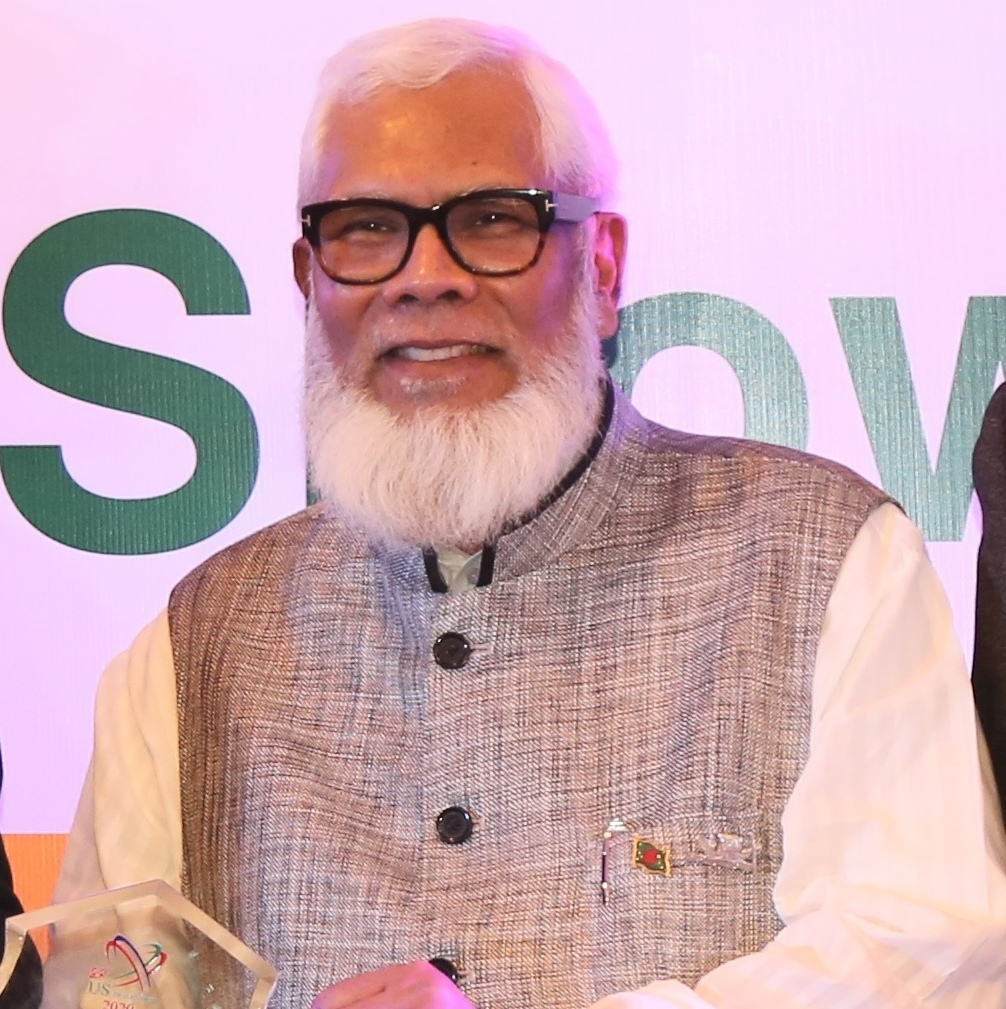
Salman F Rahman

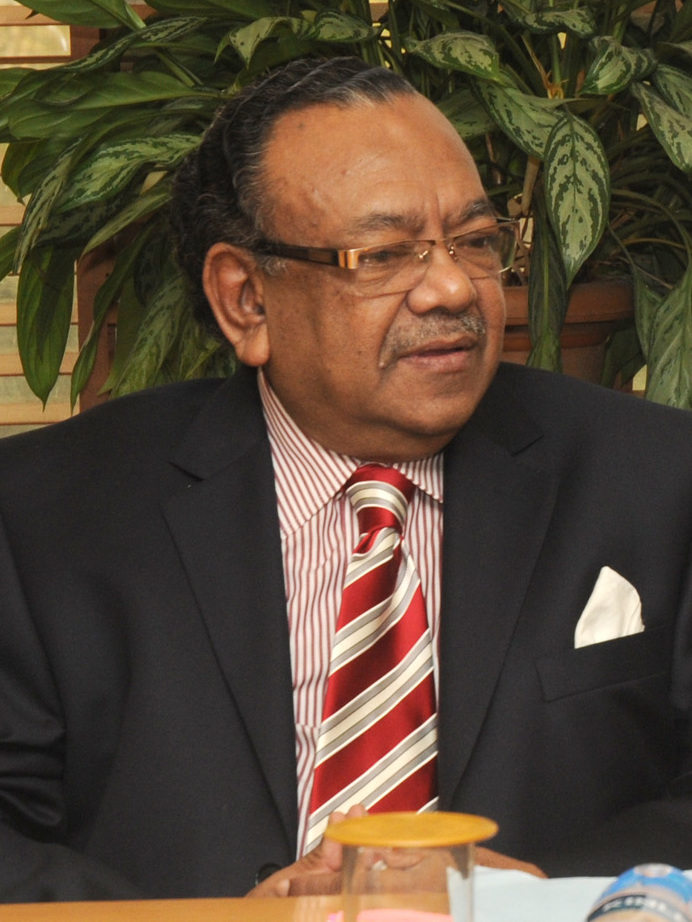
AFM Ruhal Haque

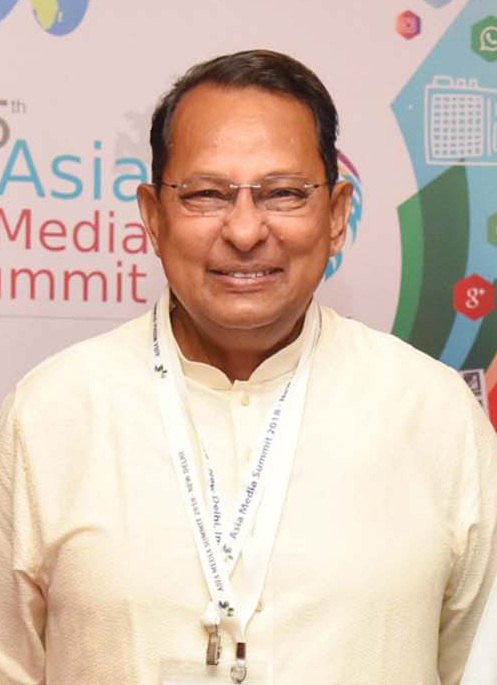
Hasanul Haq Inu

Name	Class year	Notability	Reference(s)
Aboul B. Khan	1978	Member of the New Hampshire House of Representatives	
Abu Saleh Mohammad Nazmul Huq		Member of Parliament	
Aolad Hossain		Member of Parliament	
AFM Ruhal Haque	1961	former minister and physician	
A. K. Faezul Huq		former minister	
Akhtaruzzaman Chowdhury Babu		former Member of Parliament	
Anwar Hossain Manju		former minister	
Dr. Abdul Moyeen Khan		former minister	
Chowdhury Tanbir Ahmed Siddiky	1953	former minister	
Faisal Biplob		Member of Parliament	
Golam Dastagir Gazi		Industrialist, minister of Textiles and Jute of Government of Bangladesh	
Haider Akbar Khan Rono	1960	politician, and writer	
Hasanul Haq Inu	1966	former minister, leader of Jatiya Samajtantrik Dal	
Dr. Kamal Hossain	1953	Lawyer, former minister, chairman of the constitution drafting committee of Bangladesh, president of the Gano Forum and leader of the Jatiya Oikya Front	
Kazi Nabil Ahmed		Member of Parliament, vice-president of Bangladesh Football Federation	
Khandaker Mahbub Hossain		lawyer and politician	
Mahfuzur Rahaman		Member of Parliament	
Matruza Hossain Mollah		former Member of Parliament	
Moyez Uddin Sharif Ruel		Member of Parliament	
Murad Hasan	1992	Former state minister	
Nazmul Huda		former minister, founder of BNF and Trinomool BNP	
Promode Mankin	1963	former minister	
Saddam Hussain	2011	President of Bangladesh Chhatra League	
Shamsher M. Chowdhury		Bir Bikrom, Former Foreign Secretary, Ambassador, Retired Army Officer (Major), Former Vice Chairman of BNP	
Shamim Haider Patwary		Former member of Parliament	
Salman F Rahman		Businessman, founder of BEXIMCO, Member of Parliament and adviser to the Prime Minister of Bangladesh	
Salahuddin Quader Chowdhury		Politician, former minister, Member of Parliament and adviser to the ex Prime Minister Khaleda Zia	
Yeafesh Osman		Architect, minister of science and technology of Government of Bangladesh	
Zahid Maleque		Minister of Health and Family Welfare of Government of Bangladesh	
Ziauddin Ahmed Bablu		Former minister, secretary general of Jatiya Party	

=== Diplomats ===
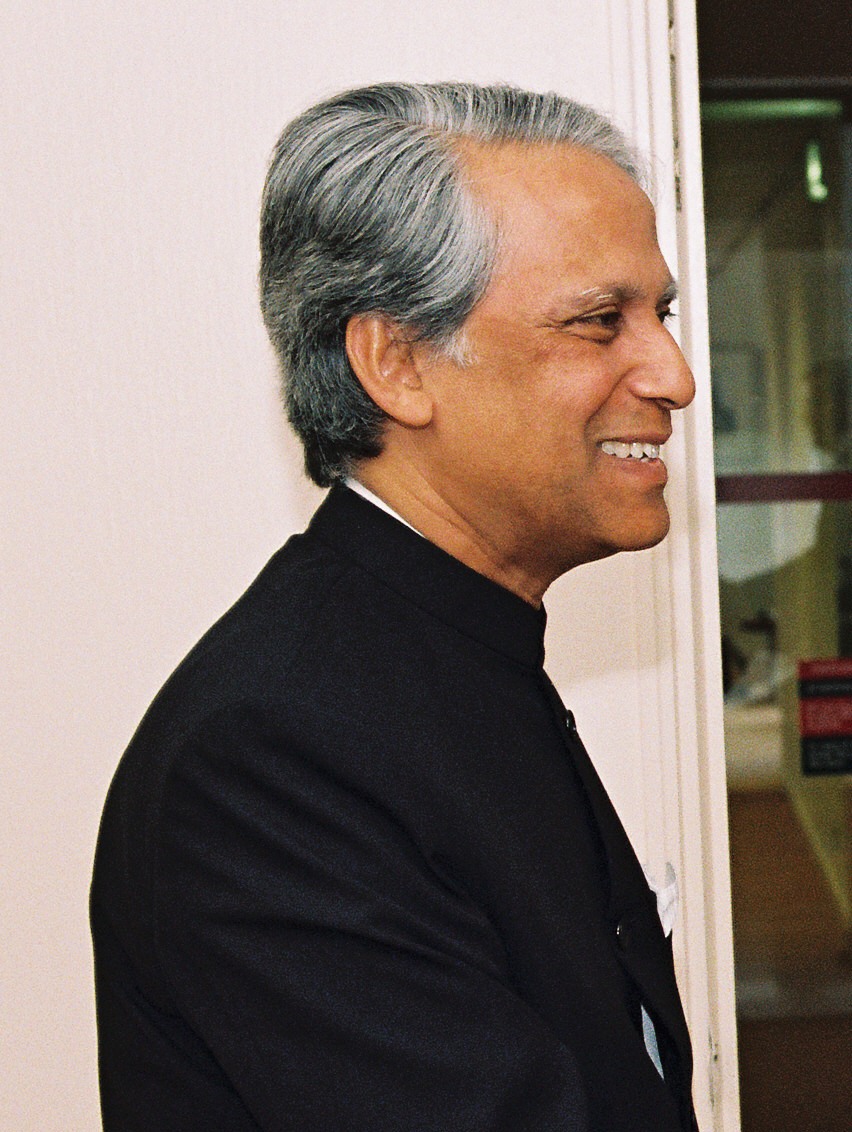
Muhammad Zamir

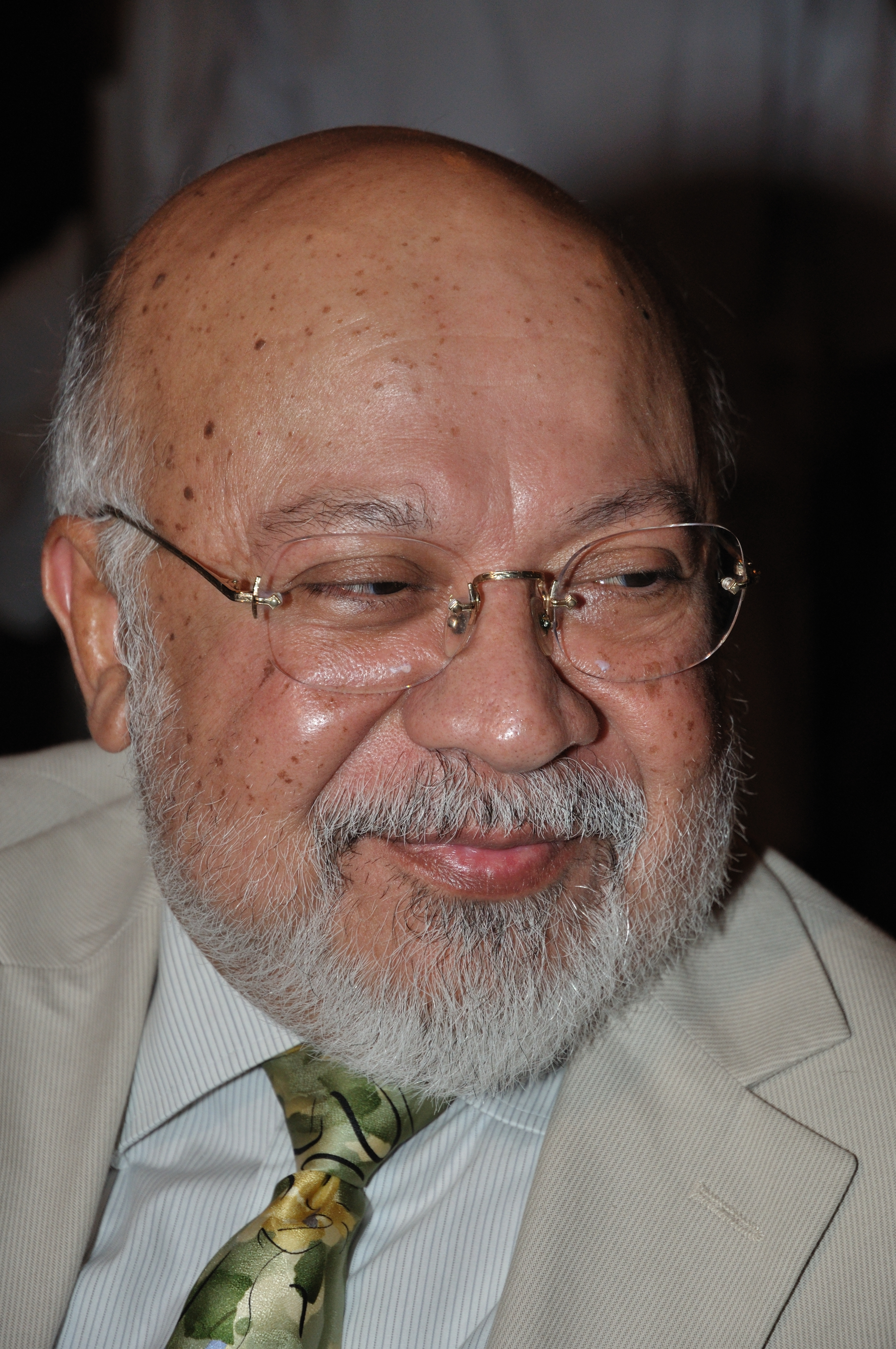
Tariq Ahmed Karim

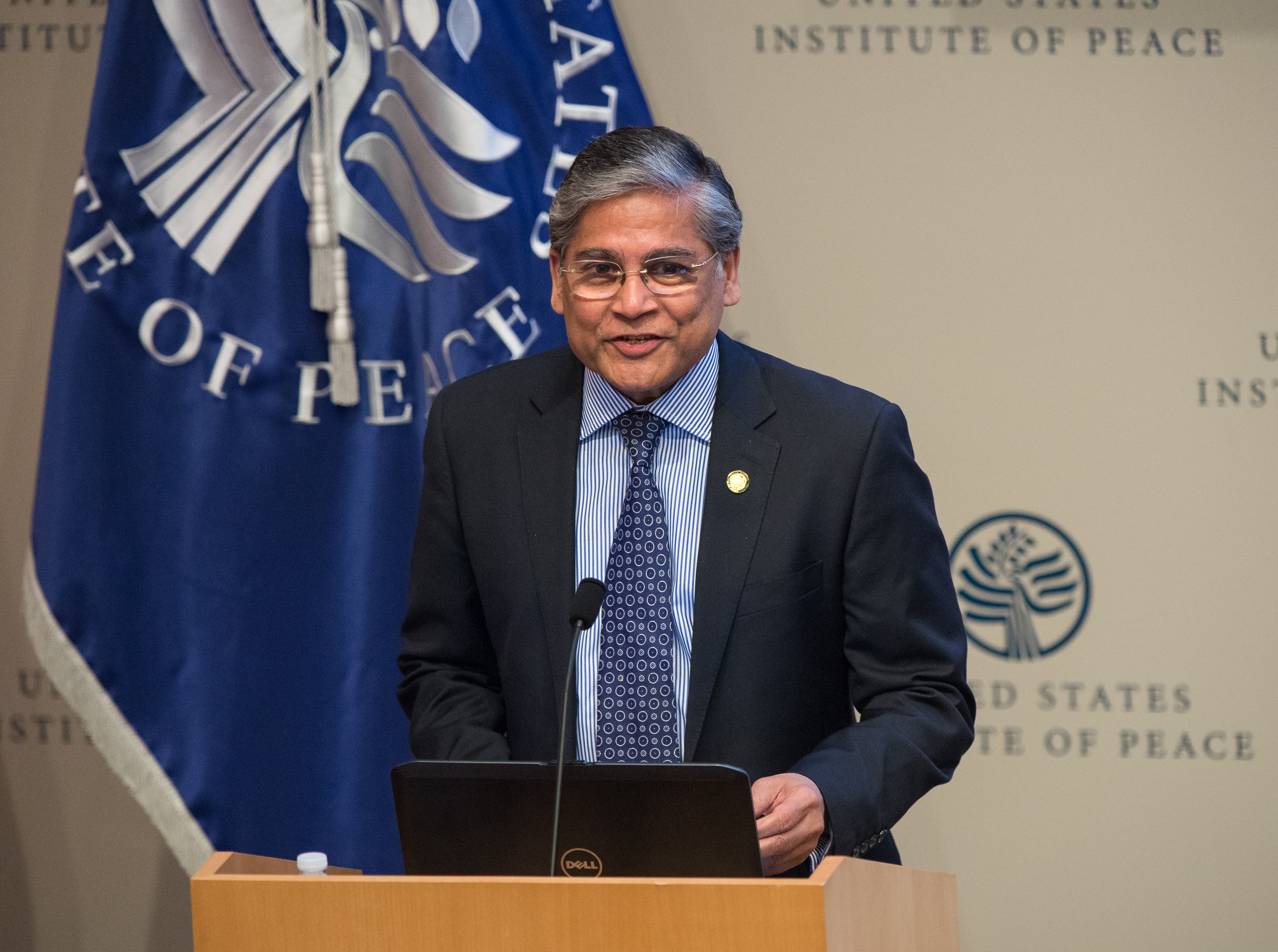
Mohammad Ziauddin

Name	Class year	Notability	Reference(s)
Hemayet Uddin	1966	Diplomat, former Foreign Secretary	
John Gomes		Major general, former ambassador of Bangladesh to the Philippines	
Mohammad Ziauddin	1964	Former Ambassador of Bangladesh to the United States	
Muhammad Zamir		Former ambassador and chief information commissioner	
Tariq Ahmed Karim	1962	Former Ambassador of Bangladesh to the United States	

== Military ==
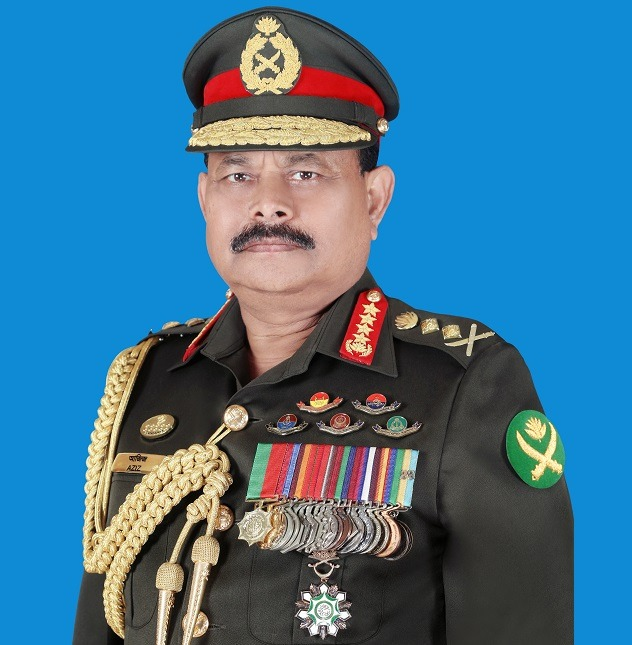
Aziz Ahmed

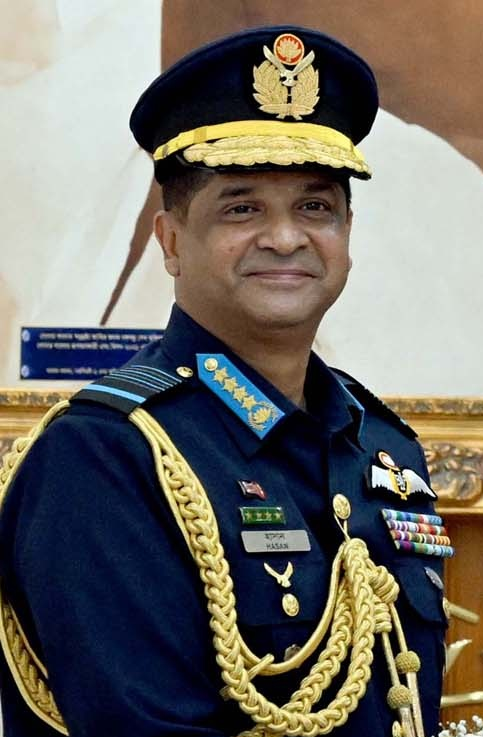
Hasan Mahmood Khan

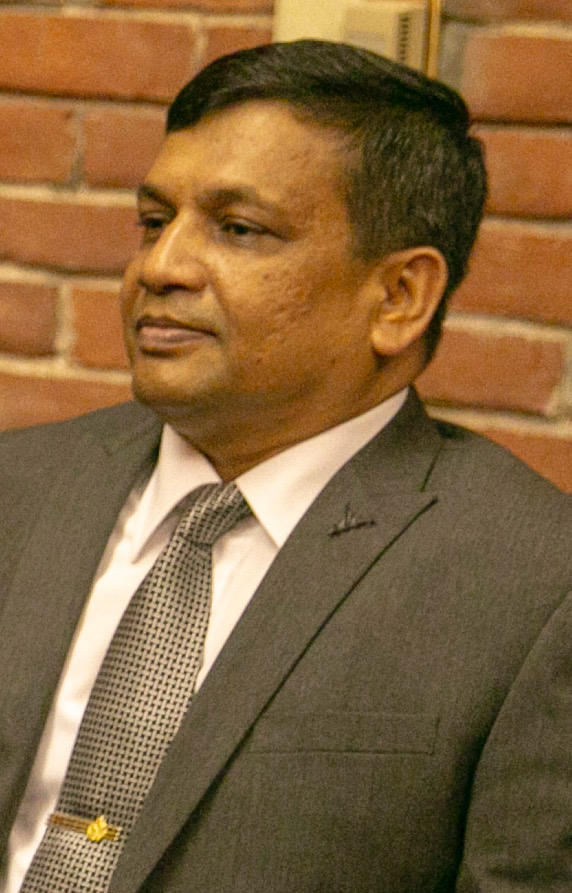
Masihuzzaman Serniabat

Name	Class year	Notability	Reference(s)
Abu Mayeen Ashfakus Samad	1967	Lieutenant, Bir Uttom	
Abdullahil Amaan Azmi		Former brigadier general, victim of forced disappearance	
Aziz Ahmed	1977	Former Chief of Army Staff (Bangladesh)	
Hasan Mashhud Chowdhury	1966	Former Chief of Army Staff (Bangladesh) and former chairman of the Anti-Corruption Commission	
Hasan Mahmood Khan	1983	Chief of Air Staff (Bangladesh)	
Ikram Sehgal		Major (rtd.), defence analyst and security expert of Pakistan	
Masihuzzaman Serniabat	1978	Former Chief of Air Staff (Bangladesh)	
Md Muhsin Alam		Brigadier General, Bangladesh Army and Commander of Para Commando Brigade	
Zia Ahmed		major general, former chairman of Bangladesh Telecommunication Regulatory Commission	
Zulfiqur Aziz	1984	retired rear admiral, former chairman of Chittagong Port Authority	

== Business ==
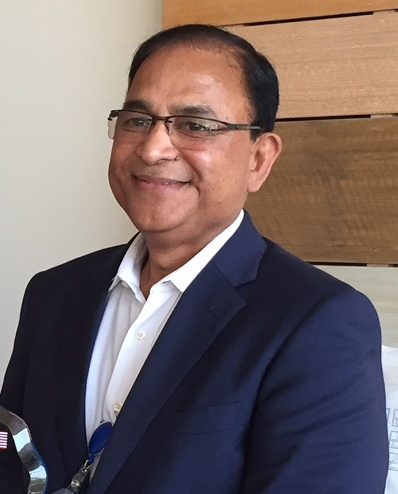
Tapan Chowdhury

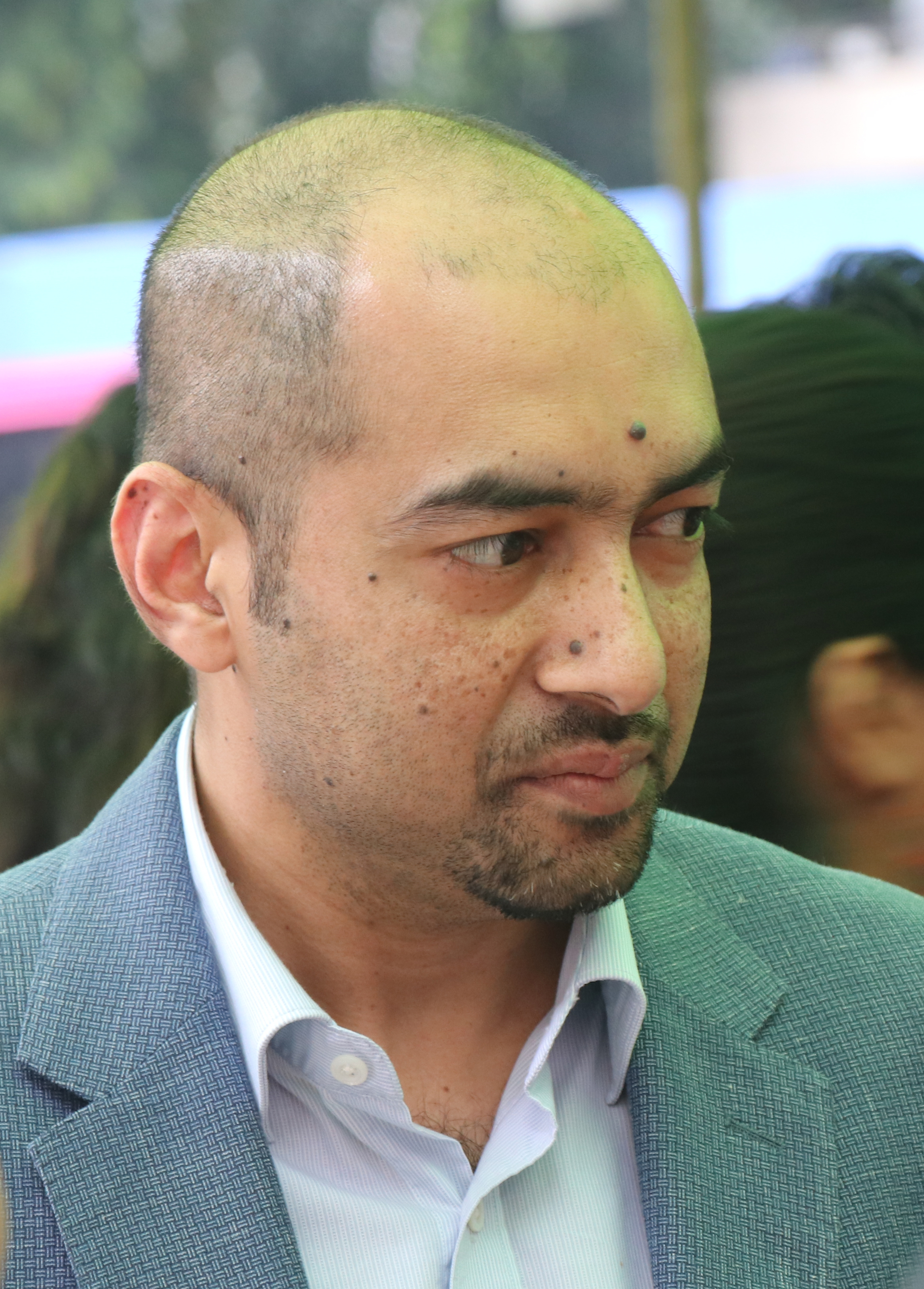
Kazi Anis Ahmed

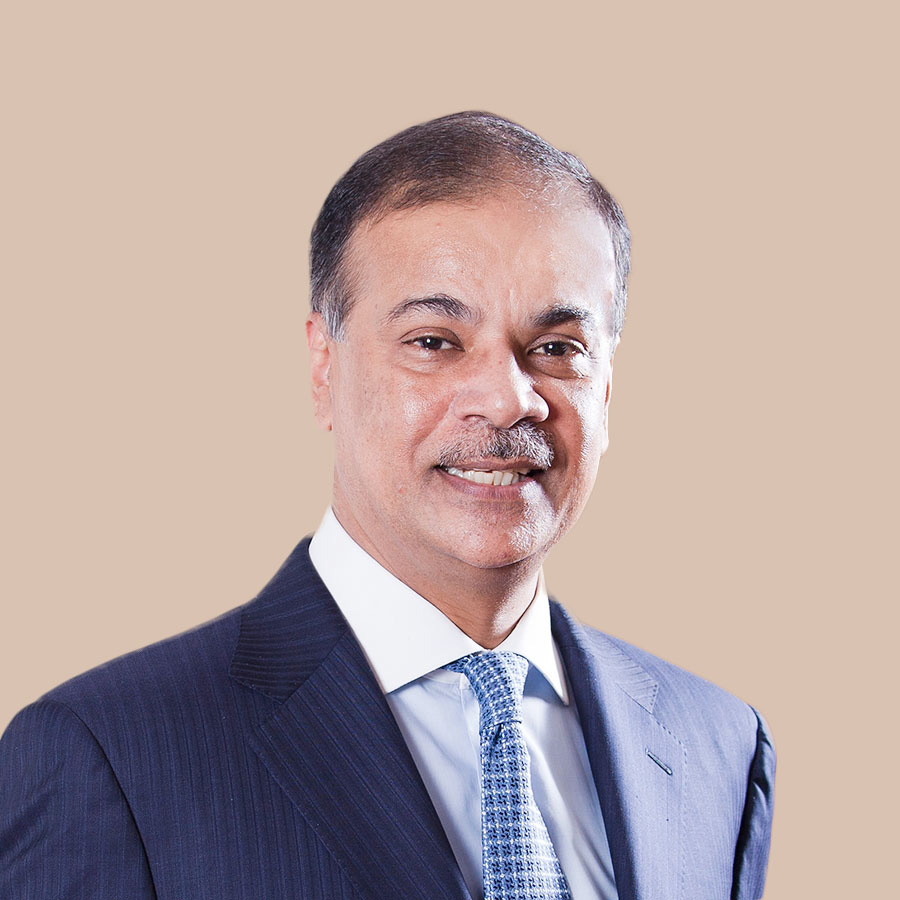
Aziz Khan

Name	Class year	Notability	Reference(s)
Aziz Khan		Businessman, founder and chairman of the Summit Group	
Kazi Anis Ahmed		Businessman, chairman of the Gemcon Group, publisher of Dhaka Tribune and Bangla Tribune	
Syed Almas Kabir	1984	Businessman, former President of BASIS	
Tapan Chowdhury		Businessman, Managing Director of Square Pharmaceuticals	

== Entertainment ==
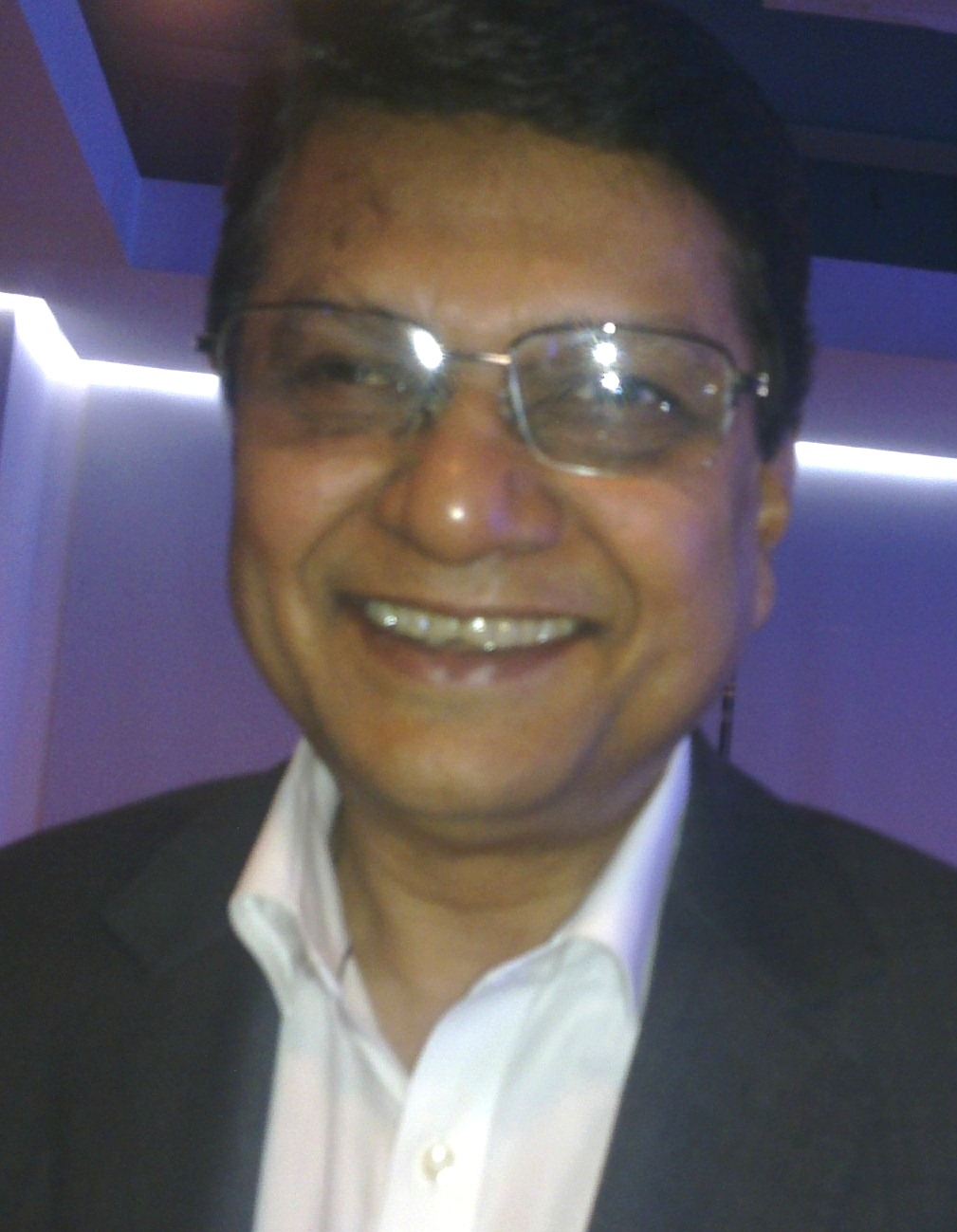
Alamgir

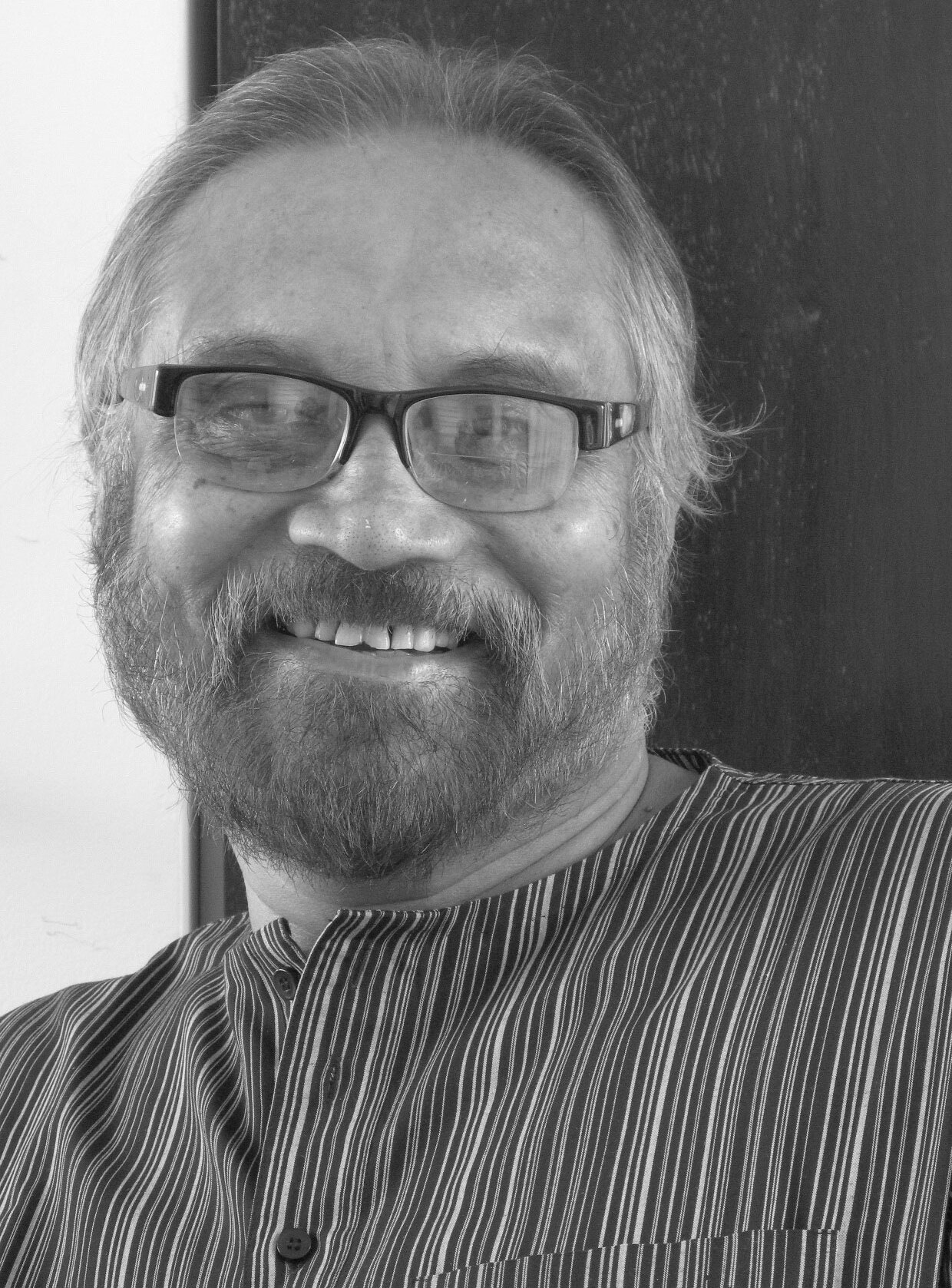
Aly Zaker

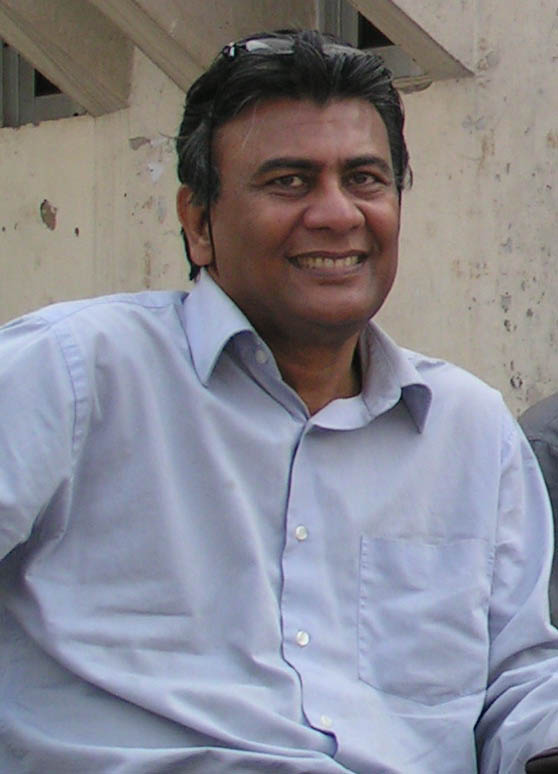
Tareque Masud

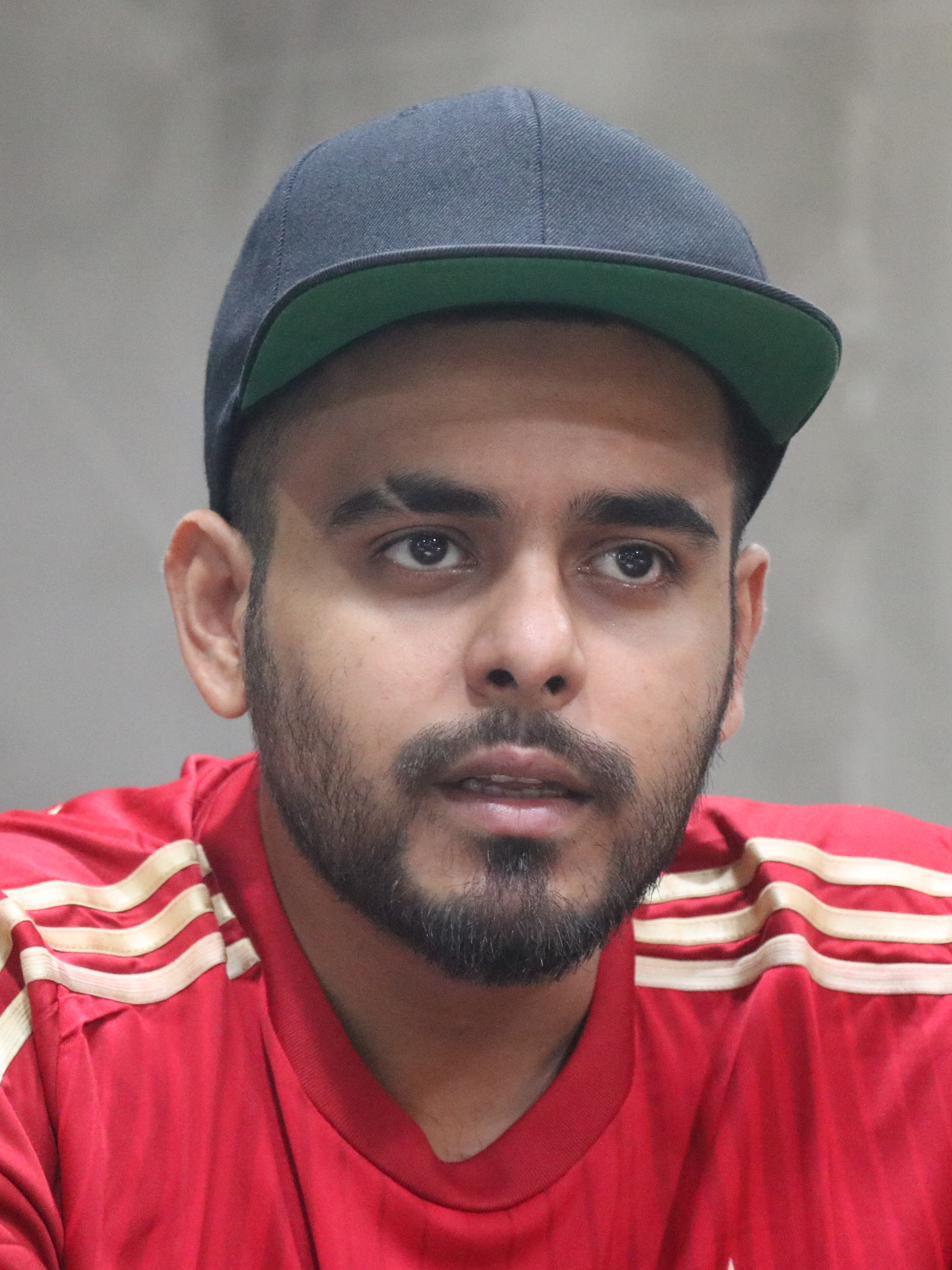
Siam Ahmed

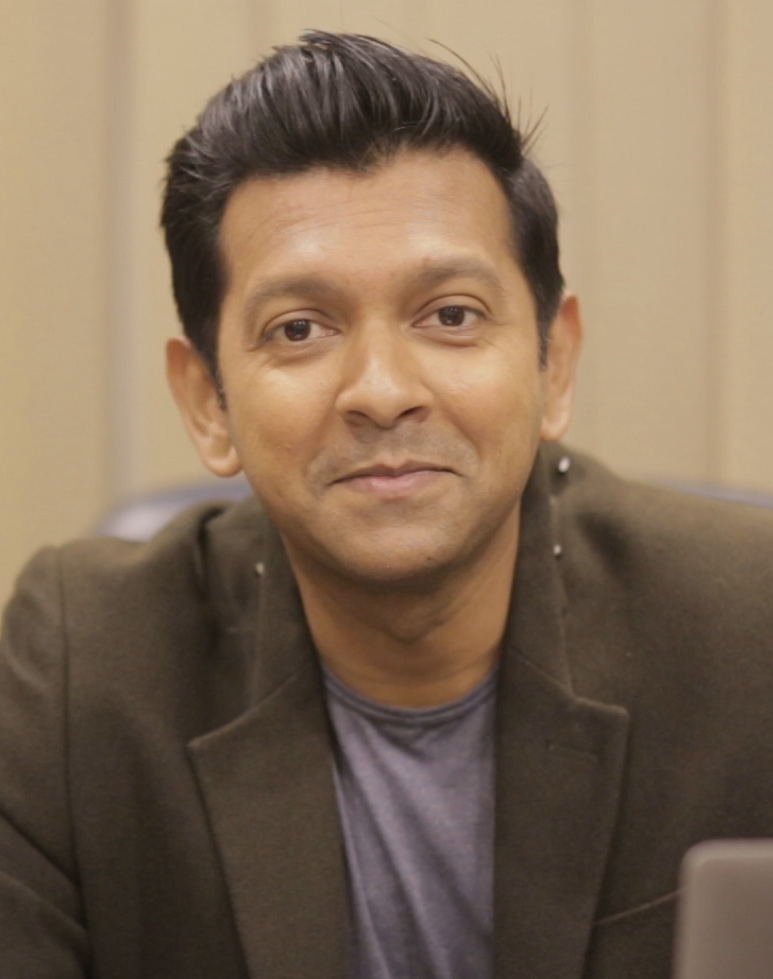
Tahsan Rahman Khan

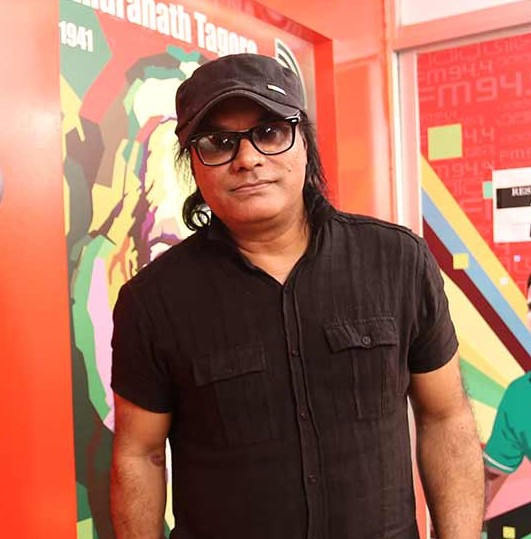
Hamin Ahmed

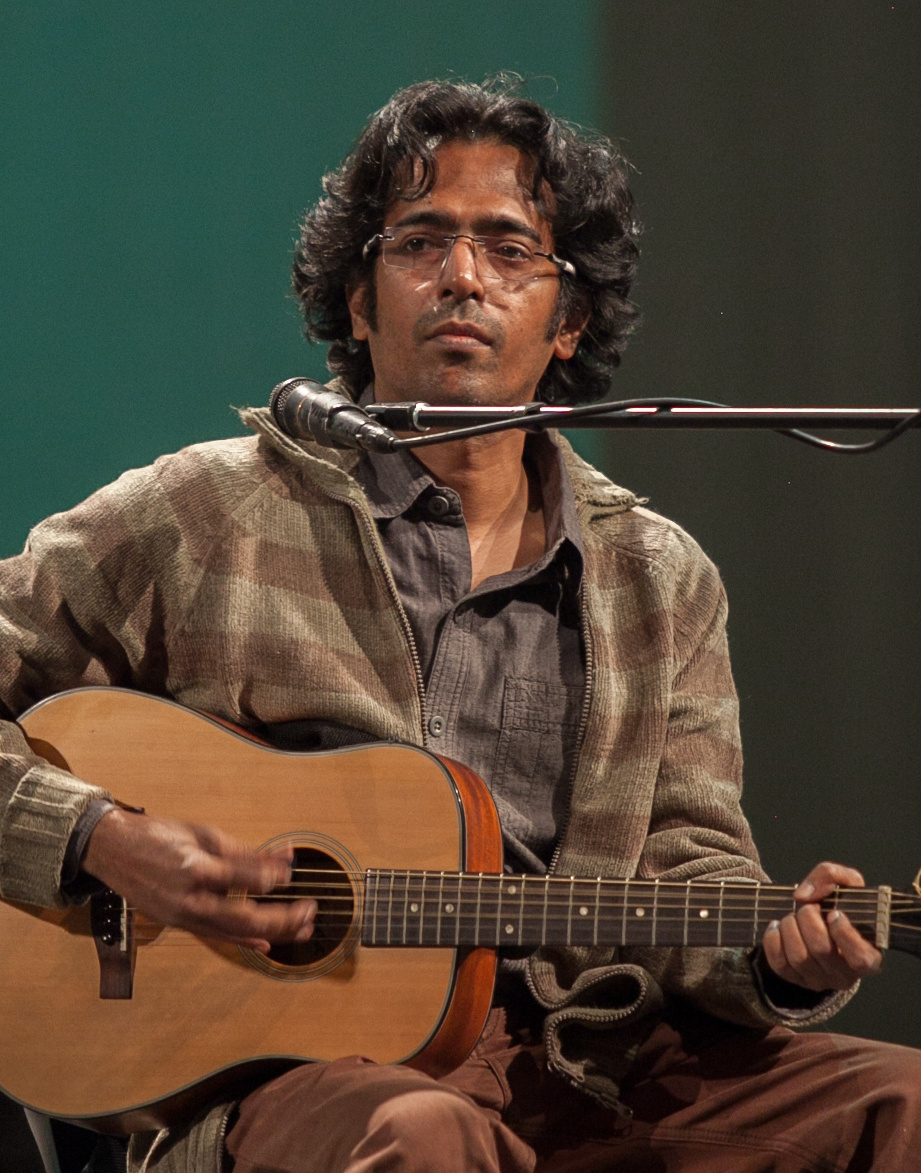
Bappa Mazumder

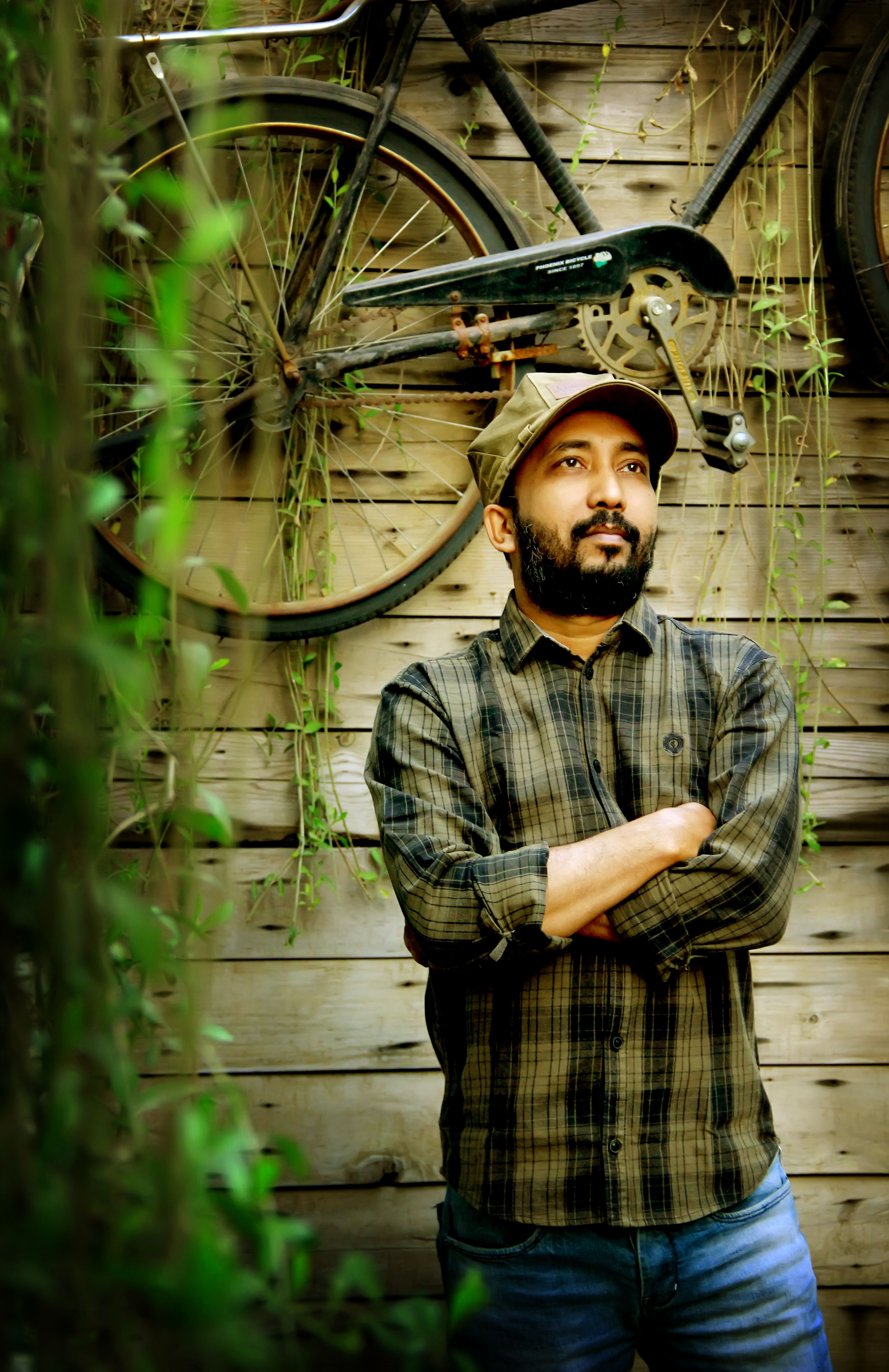
Ziaur Rahman Zia

Name	Class year	Notability	Reference(s)
Alamgir		Actor	
Aly Zaker	1962	Actor, businessman, director and writer	
Andrew Kishore		Singer	
Anwar Hossain		Cinematographer	
Arun Saha	2001	Actor and musician	
Azad Abul Kalam		Actor, director and writer	
Bappa Mazumder		Singer, lyricist and composer of Dalchhut	
Bulbul Ahmed		Actor and director	
Challenger		Actor	
Dewan Lalon Ahmed		Lyricist, writer, police officer	
Enamul Haque		Actor and academic	
Gazi Rakayet	1985	Film director and actor	
Hamin Ahmed		Musician, member of Miles (band)	
Ibrahim Ahmed Kamal		founder of Warfaze	
Lawrence Apu Rosario	1990	Cinematographer	
Mahmud Koli	1974	Actor	
Maqsoodul Haque	1975	singer	
Mohiuddin Bahar		Actor	
Rumman Rashid Khan	2000	Screenwriter, television host, and journalist	
Shahed Ali	1993	Actor	
Sheikh Monirul Alam Tipu		co-founder of Warfaze	
Siam Ahmed	2009	Actor	
Siddikur Rahman		Actor	
Swani Zubayeer		Singer, composer and music director	
Tahsan Rahman Khan	1998	Actor, singer, songwriter, composer, teacher, and model	
Tareque Masud		Film director, film producer, screenwriter and lyricist	
Wahid Ibn Reza	2000	Engineer, animator, screenwriter, filmmaker and actor	
Ziaur Rahman Zia	1993	musician, composer, bassist, songwriter, and architect	

== Journalists and media personalities ==
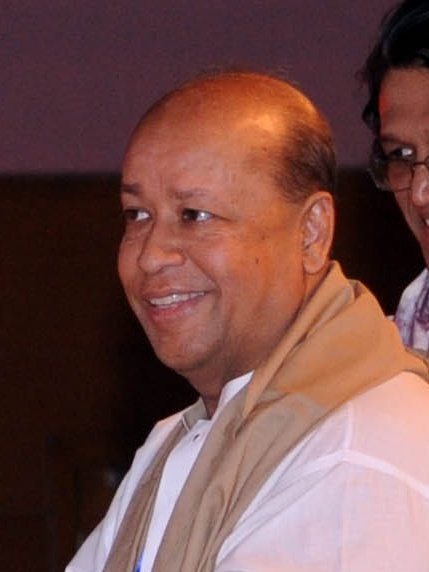
Faridur Reza Sagar

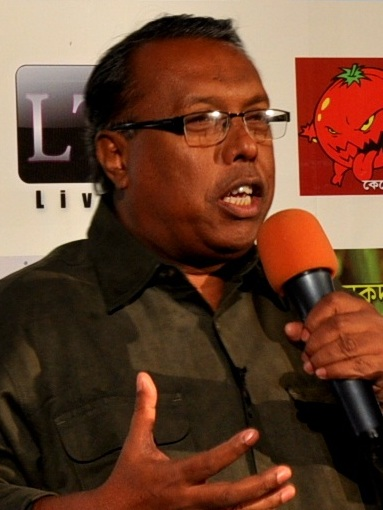
Shykh Seraj

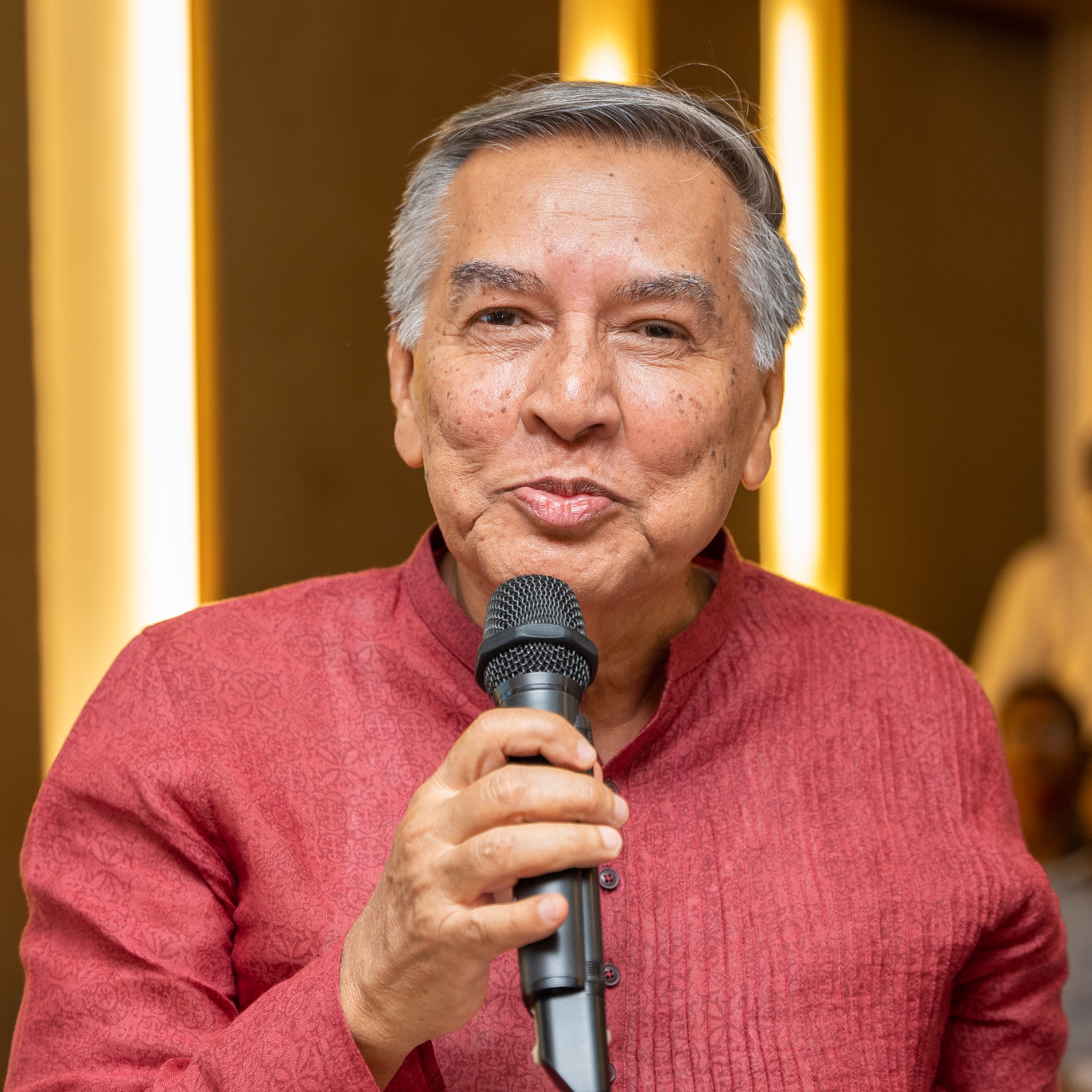
Mahfuz Anam

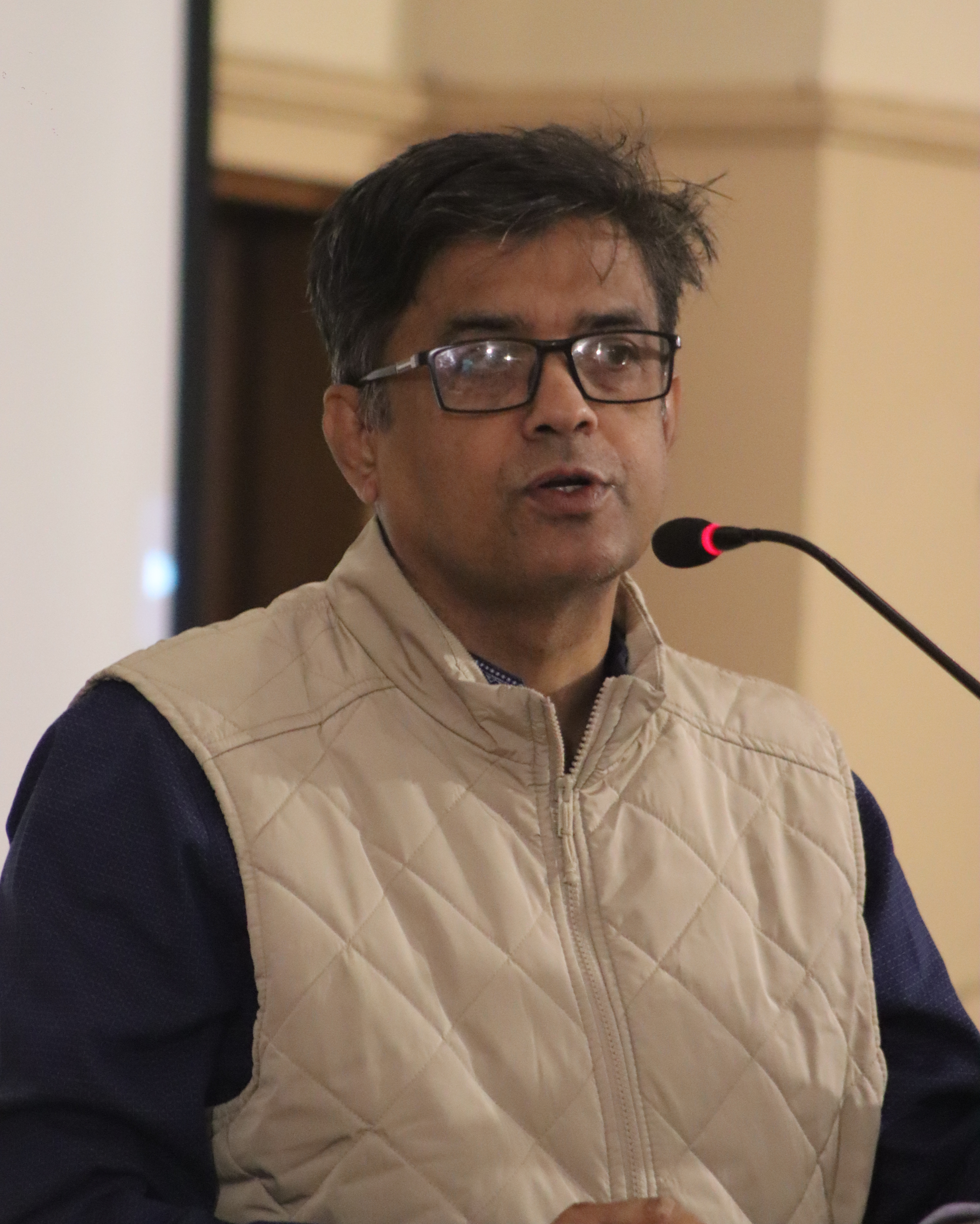
Shafiqul Alam

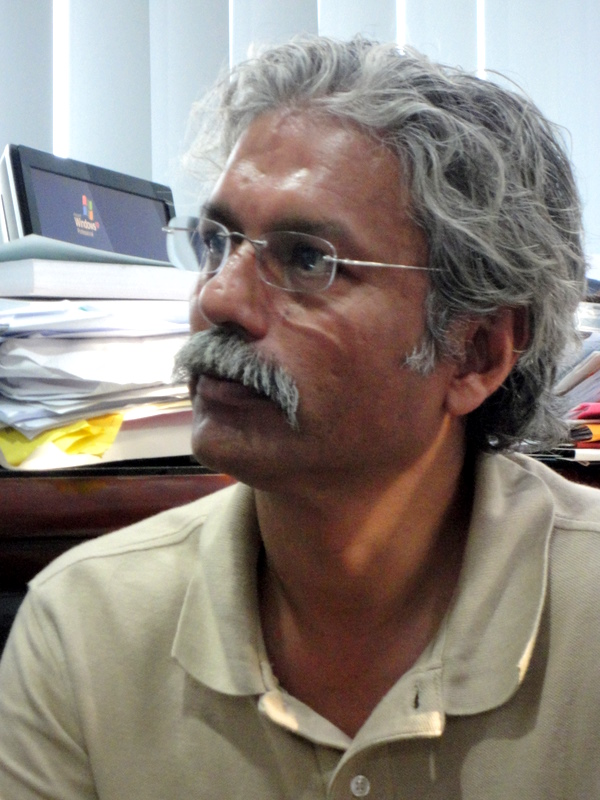
Mishuk Munier

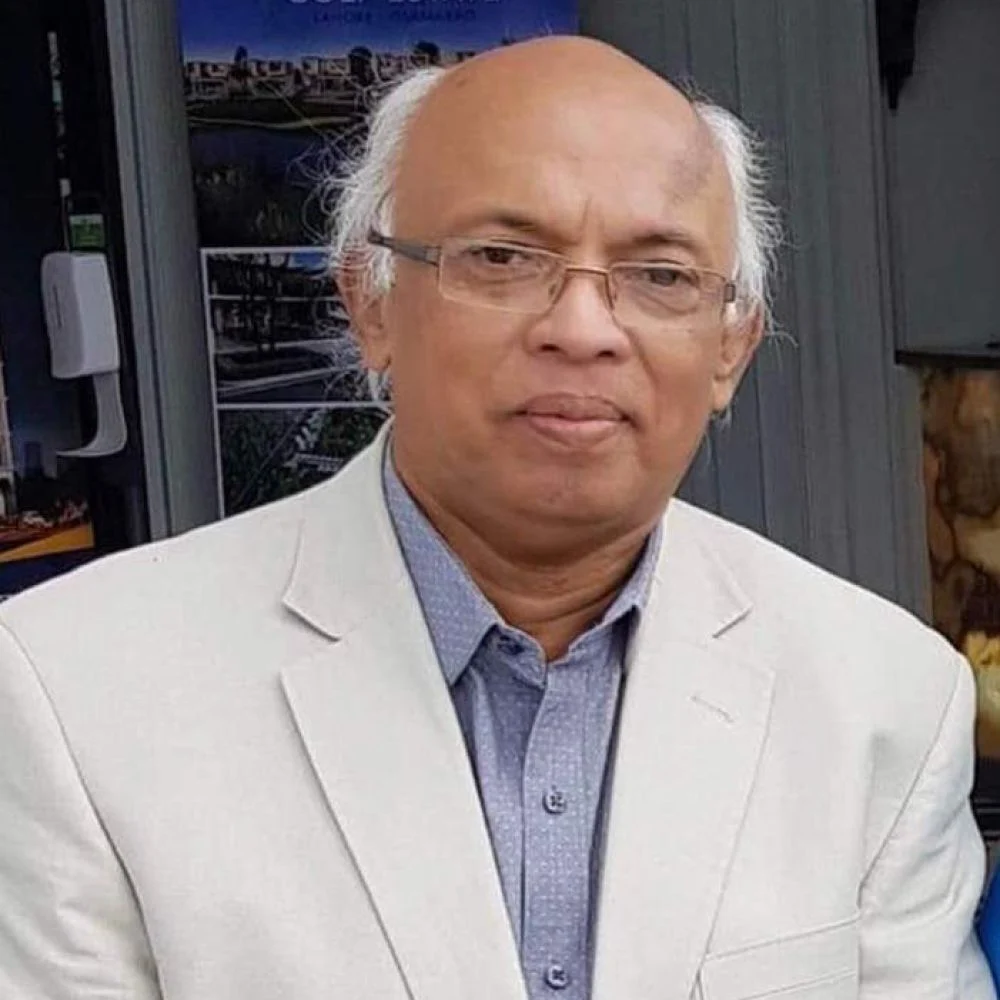
Syed Badrul Ahsan

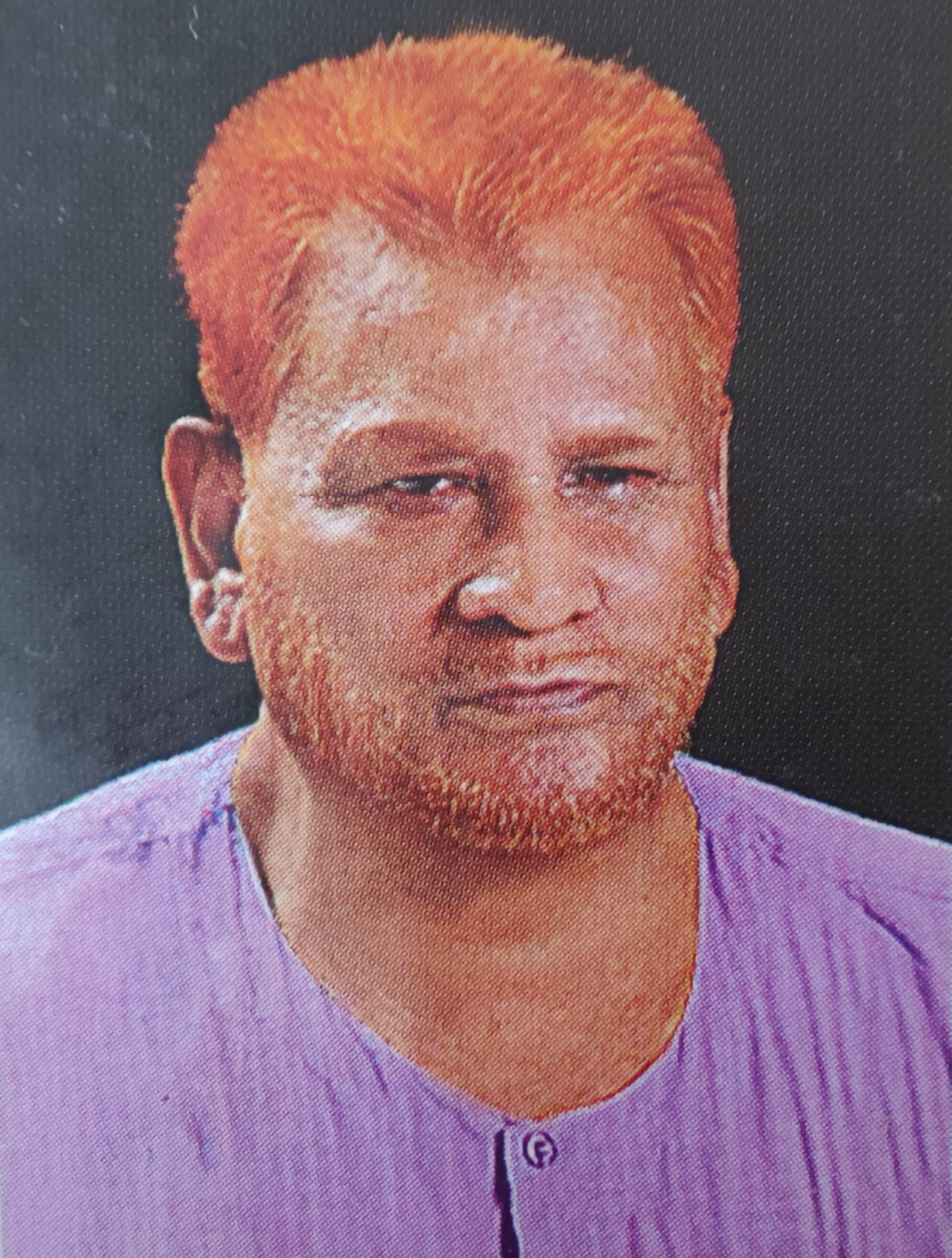
Khaled Belal

Name	Class year	Notability	Reference(s)
Faridur Reza Sagar		Managing director of Impress Telefilm Ltd and Channel i	
Gazi Shahabuddin Ahmed		Founder and editor of Sachitra Shandhani	
Khaled Belal		Journalist	
Mahfuz Anam		Editor and publisher of The Daily Star, publisher of Shaptahik 2000 and Anandadhara, former publisher of Prothom Alo	
Mishuk Munier		Broadcast journalist, cofounder of TRNN, former CEO of ATN News	
Shafiqul Alam		Journalist, press secretary to the chief adviser	
Shykh Seraj		Bangladeshi journalist, media personality and agriculture development activist	
Syed Badrul Ahsan		Journalist, teacher, former editor-in-charge of The Asian Age	

== Literature and writing ==
Name	Class year	Notability	Reference(s)
Fakrul Alam	1969	academic, writer, and translator	
Hayat Mamud	1958 (did not graduate)	Essayist and poet	
Mohammad Rafiq	1958 (did not graduate)	Poet	
Mohiuddin Ahmed		Author, publisher, and founder of UPL	
Muhammad Nurul Kadir	1959 (IA) 1961 (BA)	Lawyer and writer	

== Mountaineer ==
Name	Class year	Notability	Reference(s)
Musa Ibrahim	1996	First Bangladeshi to reach the summit of Mount Everest	
Muhammad Abdul Muhit	1987	Second Bangladeshi to reach the summit of Mount Everest	

== Religion ==
Name	Class year	Notability	Reference(s)
Bejoy Nicephorus D'Cruze	1976	Archbishop of Dhaka, former bishop of Khulna and Sylhet	
Emmanuel Kanon Rozario		Bishop of Barisal	
Francis Anthony Gomes		Former bishop of Mymensingh	
Gervas Rozario	1973 (HSC); 1975 (BA)	Bishop of Rajshahi	
James Romen Boiragi		Bishop of Khulna	
Lawrence Subrata Howlader		Archbishop of Chittagong	
Moses Costa	1971 (IA); 1973 (BA)	Former archbishop of Chittagong	
Patrick D'Rozario		The first Bangladeshi cardinal, former archbishop of Dhaka	
Paulinus Costa	1957	Former archbishop of Dhaka	
Shafiur Rahman Farabi	2005	Islamist blogger and activist	
Sebastian Tudu		Bishop of Dinajpur	
Shorot Francis Gomes		Bishop of Sylhet	
Subroto Boniface Gomes		Auxiliary bishop of Dhaka	

== Sports ==
Name	Class year	Notability	Reference(s)
Anwar Hossain	1955	Bangladeshi football player and coach	
Gholam Nousher	1980	Cricketer	
Haleem Chaudhri (mostly known as Shaheed Jewel)	1967	Bengali cricketer and a recipient of Bir Bikrom	
Ibrahim Saber		Bangladeshi field hockey player	
Nazmul Abedeen Fahim	1977	Cricket coach, recipient of National Sports Award	
Raisuddin Ahmed		Bengali cricketer and former general secretary of the BCB	
Reefat Bin-Sattar	1992	Bangladeshi chess Grandmaster	
Shahriar Nafees	2003	Bangladeshi cricketer (batsman)	
Shamim Kabir	1962	Cricketer	

== Other ==
Name	Class year	Notability	Reference(s)
Abdur Raquib Khandaker		Former Inspector General of Police	
Abrar Fahad	2017	Recipient of Swadhinata Padak	
Abul Kalam Shamsuddin	1960	Recipient of Swadhinata Padak	
Anwarul Haque		Justice	
Hassan Mahmood Khandker	1972	former IGP and former Director General of Rapid Action Battalion	
Hasan Saifuddin Chandan		Photographer	
Hedayetullah Al Mamun	1976	Former senior secretary	
Iqbal Khan Chowdhury	1973	Former secretary, former chairperson of BTC and Competition Commission, VC of ASA University	
Iqbal Mahmood	1974	Former chairman of the Anti-Corruption Commission	
Kamal Uddin Siddiqui	1962	Former Principal Secretary to the Prime Minister of Bangladesh	
Kazi Shahidun Nabi		Former Attorney General of Bangladesh	
Mehdi Hasan Khan	2003	Software developer and physician. Developer of Avro Keyboard	
Md. Nurul Islam	1981	Comptroller and auditor general of Bangladesh	
Mohammad Azam	1993	Director General of Bangla Academy	
Mukit Majumder Babu		Environmental activist	
Rashiduddin Ahmad	1955	Neurosurgeon	
Syed Abdus Samad		Former principal secretary to the prime minister	
Shamsul Alam Khan Milon	1975	physician, killed during the 1990 mass uprising	
Taqsem A. Khan	1975	Managing Director of Dhaka WASA	

== See also ==
- List of Dhaka College alumni
