= List of ambassadors of Bangladesh to the United States =

Coordinates: 38°56′30.6″N 77°4′4.6″W

Ambassador of Bangladesh to the United States
- যুক্তরাষ্ট্রে নিযুক্ত বাংলাদেশের রাষ্ট্রদূত
- Government Seal of Bangladesh
- Incumbent; Tareq Md Ariful Islam since September 3, 2025
- Ministry of Foreign Affairs
- Style: The Honourable (formal); Mr. or Madam Ambassador (informal); His Excellency (diplomatic)
- Reports to: Chief Adviser; Minister of Foreign Affairs
- Residence: Washington, DC
- Seat: Intl. Dr NW, Washington, DC United States
- Nominator: The government of Bangladesh
- Appointer: The president of Bangladesh; on the advice of the; chief adviser
- Term length: Chief adviser’s pleasure
- Inaugural holder: Enayet Karim
- Formation: 5 May 1972; 54 years ago
- Salary: ৳300000 (US$2,400) per month (incl. allowances)
- Website: washington.mofa.gov.bd/en

The Bangladeshi ambassador to the United States is the official representative of the government of Bangladesh to the government of the United States.

== List of representatives ==
Term start	Term end	Ambassador	Observations	Prime minister of Bangladesh	President of the United States
January 1973	August 1975	M Hossain Ali		Mujibur Rahman	Richard Nixon
September 1975	August 1978	Mustafizur Rahman Siddiqi		Muhammad Mansur Ali	Gerald Ford
September 1978	May 1982	Tabarak Husain		Mashiur Rahman	Jimmy Carter
June 1982	September 1984	Humayun Rashid Choudhury		Hossain Mohammad Ershad	Ronald Reagan
October 1984	December 1987	Abu Zafar Obaidullah		Ataur Rahman Khan	Ronald Reagan
December 1987	September 1991	A. H. S. Ataul Karim		Moudud Ahmed	Ronald Reagan
October 1991	December 1993	Abul Ahsan		Khaleda Zia	George H. W. Bush
January 1994	November 1996	Humayun Kabir		Khaleda Zia	Bill Clinton
November 1996	March 2001	K.M. Shehabuddin		Muhammad Habibur Rahman	Bill Clinton
April 2001	January 2002	Ahmad Tariq Karim		Latifur Rahman	George W. Bush
January 2002	March 2005	Syed Hasan Ahmad		Khaleda Zia	George W. Bush
March 2005	April 2007	Shamsher M. Chowdhury		Khaleda Zia	George W. Bush
July 2007	August 2009	M. Humayun Kabir		Fakhruddin Ahmed	George W. Bush
August 2009	June 2014	Akramul Qader		Sheikh Hasina	Barack Obama
August 2014	December 2020	Mohammad Ziauddin		Sheikh Hasina	Barack Obama
January 2021	August 2022	M Shahidul Islam		Sheikh Hasina	Donald Trump; Joe Biden
September 2022	September 2024	Muhammad Imran		Sheikh Hasina	Joe Biden
December 2024	12 June 2025	Asad Alam Siam		Muhammad Yunus	Joe Biden; Donald Trump
3 September 2025	Present	Tareq Md Ariful Islam		Muhammad Yunus	Donald Trump

== See also ==
- List of high commissioners of Bangladesh to Canada
- List of ambassadors of Bangladesh to Kingdom of Saudi Arabia
- List of high commissioners of Bangladesh to the United Kingdom
- List of high commissioners of Bangladesh to Pakistan
- List of high commissioners of Bangladesh to India
