= Kamaluddin Choudhury =

Bangladeshi educationist and diplomat

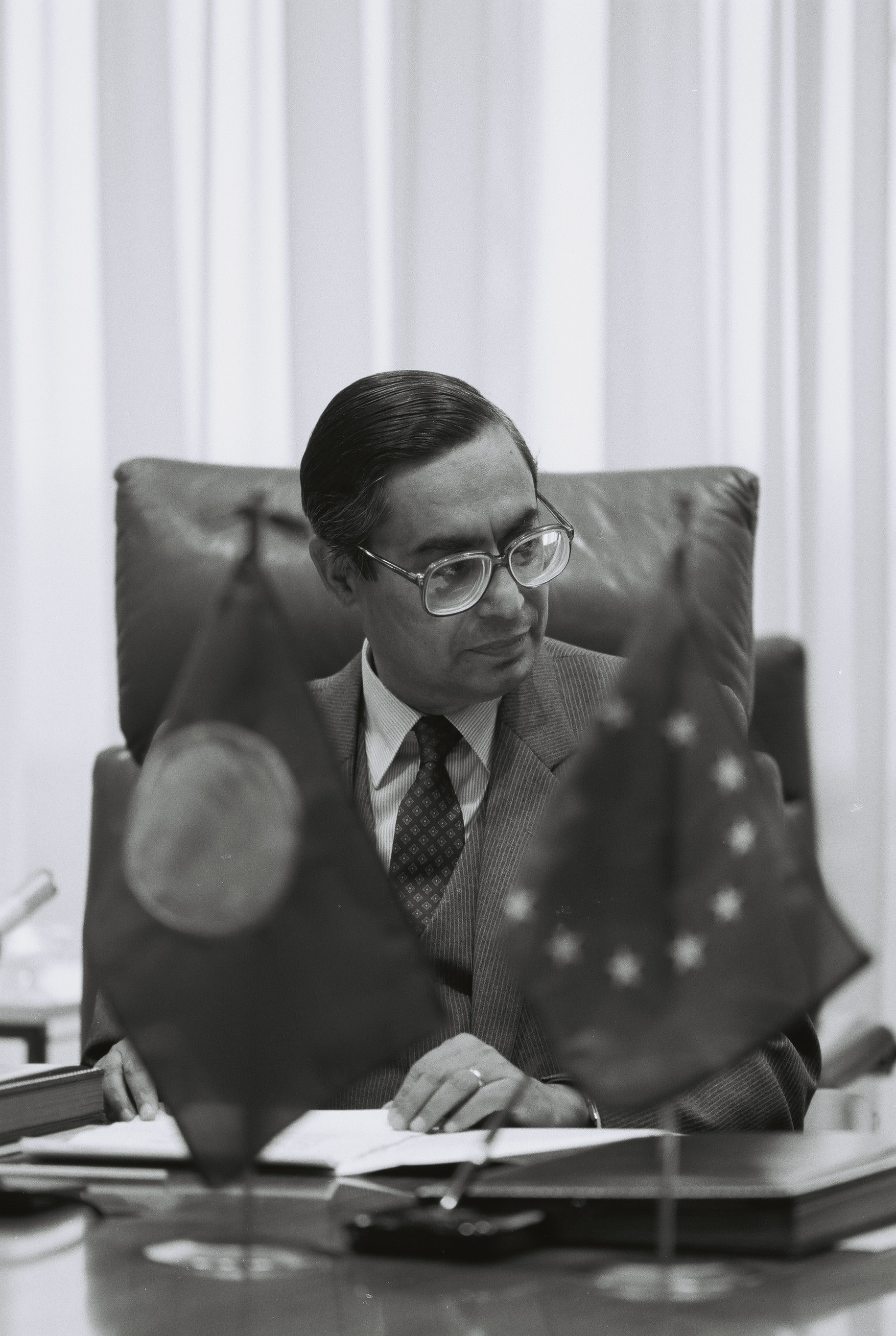
- Choudhury at the European Union in Brussels (1989)

Ambassador of Bangladesh to Belgium, Netherlands, Luxembourg and the European Union
- In office 17 July 1988 – 31 July 1992
- Preceded by: Mohammed Mohsin
- Succeeded by: Syed Hasan Ahmad

Personal details
- Born: 5 March 1936
- Died: 12 November 2022 (aged 86) United States

A.K.M. Kamaluddin Choudhury (5 March 1936 – 12 November 2022) was a Bangladeshi educationist and diplomat. He was an ambassador of Bangladesh to Belgium, Netherlands, Luxembourg and the European Union. He served as a member and the chairman of the Board of Trustees of the University of Asia Pacific (UAP). He was the vice-chancellor of the university in 2001.
