= Akramul Qader =

Bangladeshi diplomat

- আকরামুল কাদের
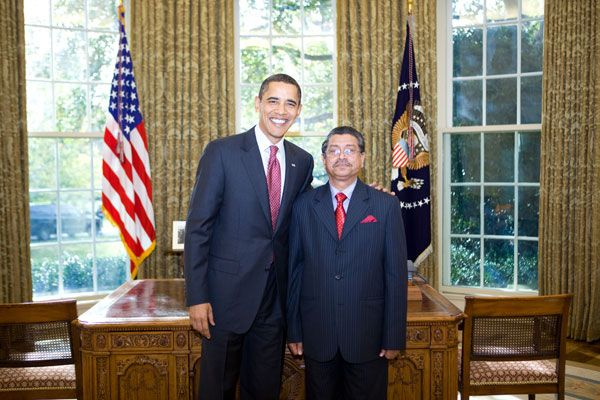
- Barack Obama and Qader at the Oval Office (2009)

Ambassador of Bangladesh to the United States
- In office 4 November 2009 – May 2014
- Preceded by: M. Humayun Kabir
- Succeeded by: Mohammad Ziauddin

Bangladesh Ambassador to Thailand
- In office 24 November 1996 – 7 April 1999
- Preceded by: Mohammad Julmat Ali Khan
- Succeeded by: Suhrab Hossain

Personal details
- Education: University of Dhaka

Akramul Qader is a Bangladeshi diplomat and former Ambassador of Bangladesh to the United States. He was the longest serving ambassador of Bangladesh to the United States. He had the rank of a state minister in the government.

== Early life ==
Qader completed his M.A. in Islamic History from the University of Dhaka. In the 1960s, he taught in college and would later join the Pakistan Ministry of Foreign Office as a section officer. He graduated in 1970 from National Institute of Public Administration, Dhaka, and in 1973 completed a Foreign Service Training Course in Australia.

== Career ==
Qader joined the Bangladeshi Foreign Service in 1972 returning from Pakistan after the Independence of Bangladesh. He was assigned to the USSR in 1974, where he worked till 1976. He was posted in Burma from 1976 to 1981 and Pakistan from 1981 to 1984. From 1984 to 1986 he was the Director of the South East Asia Division in the Ministry of Foreign Affairs. From 1996 he served as the ambassador of Bangladesh to Thailand and Cambodia till 1999.

From 1999 to 2002, he was the High Commissioner of Bangladesh to South Africa, and was also cross-accredited as High Commissioner to Botswana, Namibia, Zimbabwe, Swaziland, and Lesotho. He served as the Permanent Representative of Bangladesh to the United Nations Economic and Social Commission for Asia and the Pacific. From November 2009 to May 2014 he was the Ambassador of Bangladesh to the United States with responsibility for Mexico and Colombia.
