= Mohammed Mohsin (diplomat) =

Bangladeshi diplomat (died 2026)

- মোহাম্মদ মহসিন
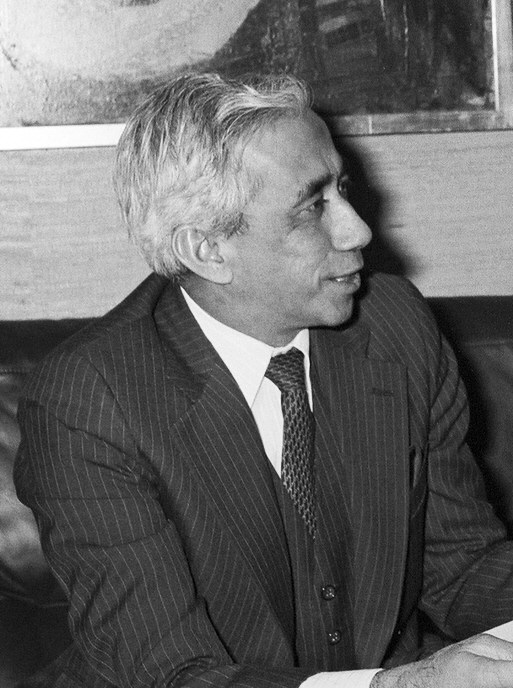
- Mohsin at the European Union in Brussels (1986)

Permanent Representative of Bangladesh to the United Nations
- In office 1991–1991
- Preceded by: A. H. G. Mohiuddin
- Succeeded by: M. Humayun Kabir

Ambassador of Bangladesh to Belgium and the European Union
- In office 1 August 1985 – 8 July 1988
- Preceded by: Manzoor Ahmed Choudhury
- Succeeded by: Kamaluddin Choudhury

Personal details
- Died: 15 January 2026

Mohammed Mohsin (died 15 January 2026) was a Bangladeshi diplomat who served as the ambassador of Bangladesh to Belgium, Saudi Arabia, the Netherlands, Luxembourg, Somalia, Nigeria, the UAE, Bahrain, Oman, Jordan, Yemen and the European Union. Mohsin died on 15 January 2026.

== Career ==
In 1991, Mohsin was appointed the Permanent Representative of Bangladesh to the United Nations.

In the 1990s, Mohsin was the chief Organisation of Islamic Cooperation representative who helped secure a peace deal between the government of Philippines and the Moro National Liberation Front on 30 August 1996. In 2005, he was awarded Grand Cross (Datu) of the Order of Sikatuna (GrCS) by the government of Philippines for this effort.
