= M Shahidul Islam =

Bangladeshi diplomat

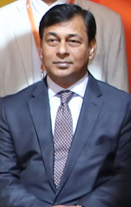

Ambassador of Bangladesh to the United States
- In office January 2021 – August 2022
- Preceded by: Mohammad Ziauddin
- Succeeded by: Muhammad Imran

2nd Secretary-General of BIMSTEC
- In office 21 September 2017 – 20 September 2020
- Preceded by: Sumith Nakandala
- Succeeded by: Tenzin Lekphell

Ambassador of Bangladesh to France
- In office 6 August 2012 – 14 September 2017
- Preceded by: Enamul Kabir
- Succeeded by: Kazi Imtiaz Hossain

Ambassador of Bangladesh to South Korea
- In office 7 February 2008 – 18 July 2012
- Preceded by: Mustafa Kamal
- Succeeded by: Enamul Kabir

Personal details
- Born: 10 June 1963 (age 63) Jhenaidah District, East Pakistan
- Education: Dhaka University

M Shahidul Islam is a retired Bangladeshi diplomat who served as the ambassador of Bangladesh to the United States. He is a former secretary general of Bay of Bengal Initiative for Multi-Sectoral Technical and Economic Cooperation. He is the former ambassador of Bangladesh to France and South Korea.

== Early life ==
Shahidul Islam was born on 10 June 1963 in Jhenaidah District, East Pakistan, Pakistan. He completed his master's degree in international affairs from the University of Dhaka in 1987. He completed a diploma from the Paris-based International Institute of Administrative Sciences in 1991.

== Career ==
Shahidul Islam joined the Foreign Service cadre of Bangladesh Civil Service in 1985.

In 1992, Shahidul Islam was the second secretary at the Deputy High Commission of Bangladesh in Kolkata and became the first secretary in 1994.

In 1996, Shahidul Islam was a counsellor at the Permanent Mission of Bangladesh to the UN Office & Other International Organizations in Geneva.

Shahidul Islam was a director in the Ministry of Foreign Affairs in the European Division in 1999 and in 2000 in the officer of the Minister of Foreign Affairs.

In 2001, Shahidul Islam was appointed a counsellor in the Bangladesh Embassy in Washington D.C. and in 2004 became the deputy chief of the mission.

From 2004 to 2008, Shahidul Islam was the director general of The Americas and the Pacific Ocean wing at the Ministry of Foreign Affairs. He was then appointed the ambassador of Bangladesh to South Korea in 2008 and served till 2012. He was then appointed the ambassador of Bangladesh to France.

Shahidul Islam was appointed the secretary general of Bay of Bengal Initiative for Multi-Sectoral Technical and Economic Cooperation on 11 August 2017. Before this appointment he was stationed as the ambassador of Bangladesh to France.

On 3 September 2020, Shahidul Islam was appointed ambassador of Bangladesh to the United States. He replaced Ambassador Mohammad Ziauddin. He is also the ambassador of Bangladesh to Colombia. He joined the embassy on 18 January 2021. The government has scrapped his the contractual appointment from 1 September 2022.

== Personal life ==
Shahidul Islam is married to Jesmeen Islam with whom he has two children.They are Ayesha Bulbuli Islam and Shajeed Shahriar Islam.
