= M. Humayun Kabir =

Bangladeshi diplomat

- এম. হুমায়ুন কবির
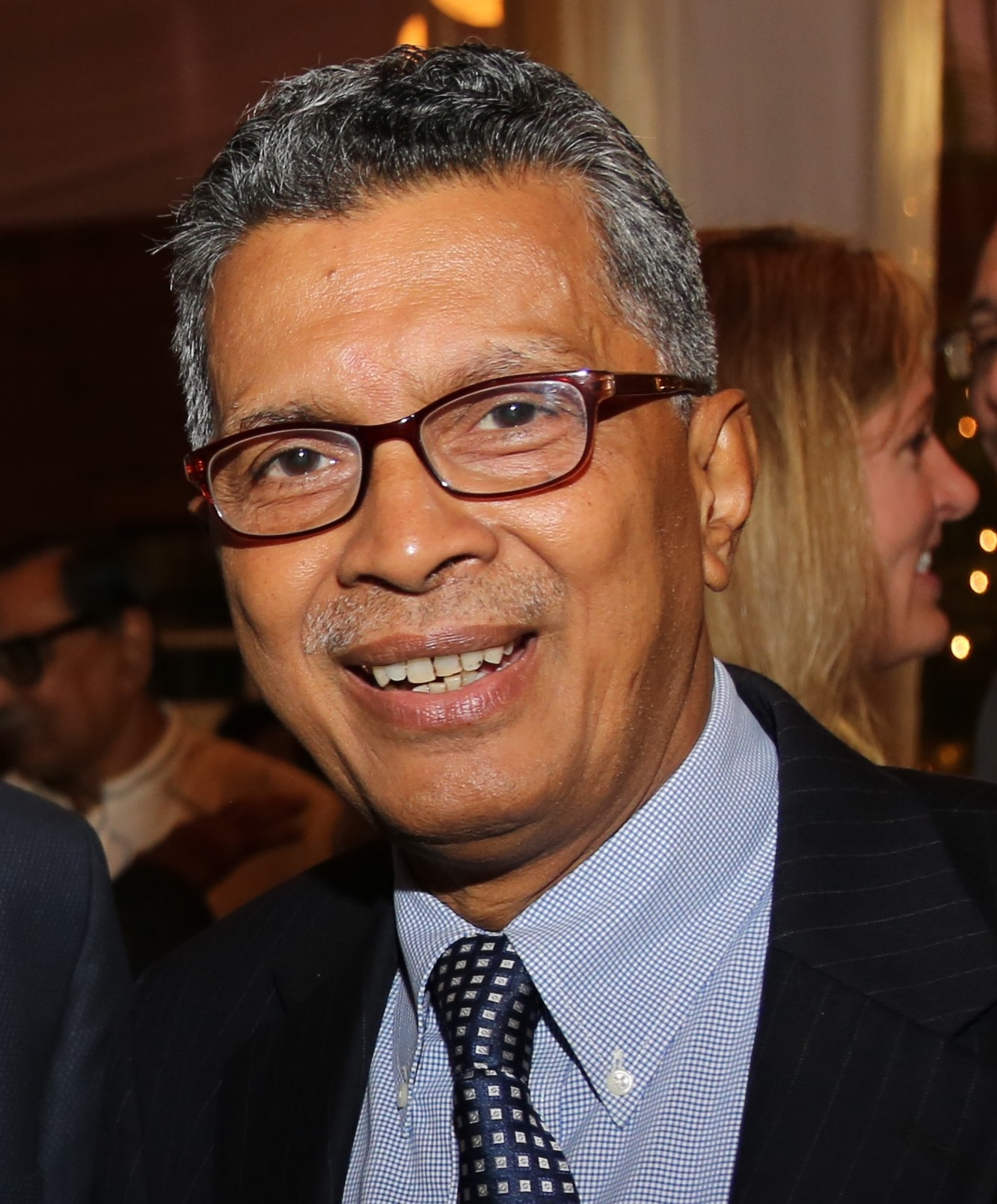
- Kabir at the US Embassy in Dhaka (2017)

Ambassador of Bangladesh to the United States
- In office July 2007 – August 2009
- Preceded by: Shamsher M. Chowdhury
- Succeeded by: Akramul Qader

High Commissioner of Bangladesh to Australia
- In office 2006–2007

Ambassador of Bangladesh to Nepal
- In office 26 August 2003 – 14 July 2006
- Preceded by: Cyril Sikder
- Succeeded by: Imtiaz Ahmed

Permanent Representative of Bangladesh to the United Nations
- In office 1991–1994
- Preceded by: Mohammed Mohsin
- Succeeded by: Reaz Rahman

Personal details
- Born: 26 September 1952 (age 74) Brahmanbaria, East Bengal, Dominion of Pakistan
- Education: University of Dhaka

M. Humayun Kabir (born 26 September 1952) is a Bangladeshi diplomat and a former ambassador of Bangladesh to the United States, and Nepal, and a former high commissioner to Australia.

== Early life ==
Kabir was born on 26 September 1952, in Brahmanbaria in the then East Bengal, Dominion of Pakistan. He did his undergrad in law and master's in political science from the University of Dhaka.

== Career ==
Kabir is a veteran of the Bangladesh Liberation War. He joined the University of Dhaka in 1977, as a lecturer in the Department of Political Science, and taught there till 1980.

Kabir worked in the Ministry of Foreign Affairs from 1982 to 1984. From 1984 to 1987, he served as the private secretary to the foreign affairs advisor. From 1987 to 1990, Kabir served as the second and first secretary of the Embassy of Bangladesh to the United States. From 1991 to 1994, he worked as the first secretary at the Bangladesh consulate in Kolkata. From 1996 to 1999, he served in the Permanent Mission of Bangladesh to the United Nations.

Kabir worked as the Deputy High Commissioner of Bangladesh based in Kolkata, from 1999 to 2001. From 2001 to 2003, he held several leadership positions at the Ministry of Foreign Affairs. He was appointed the Ambassador of Bangladesh to Nepal in September 2003, and served there till 2006. He was the High Commissioner of Bangladesh to Australia from 2006 to 2007.

Kabir was appointed the Ambassador of Bangladesh to the United States in July 2007, and worked there till 2009. He retired with the rank of secretary from the Ministry of Foreign Affairs in September 2010.

Kabir is the president of Bangladesh Enterprise Institute and a trustee board member of the Asian University for Women. He is a senior advisor to Bower Group Asia.
