= Syed Hasan Ahmad =

Bangladeshi diplomat

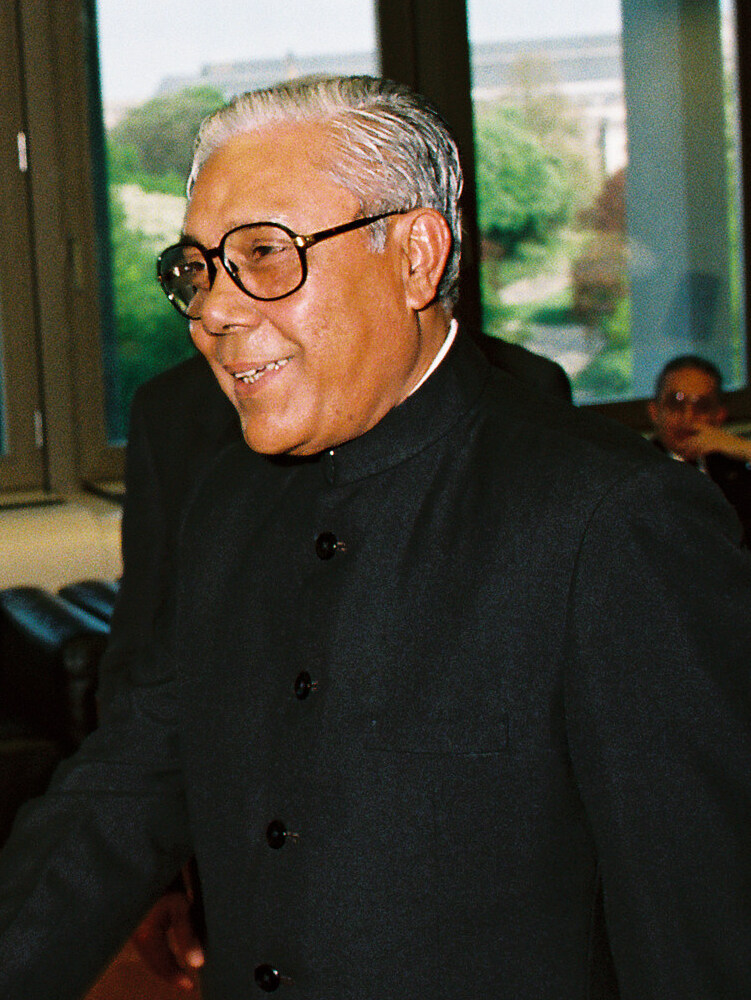
- Ahmad at the European Union in Brussels (1993)

Ambassador of Bangladesh to the United States
- In office 28 January 2002 – March 2005
- Preceded by: Tariq Ahmed Karim
- Succeeded by: Shamsher M. Chowdhury

Ambassador of Bangladesh to Luxembourg and the European Union
- In office 9 September 1992 – 14 August 1996
- Preceded by: Kamaluddin Choudhury
- Succeeded by: A.S.M. Khairul Anam

Personal details
- Education: University of Dhaka (MS)

Syed Hasan Ahmad (born 1 February 1936) is a retired Bangladeshi diplomat and a former ambassador of Bangladesh to the United States.

== Background ==
Ahmad was born on 1 February 1936. He earned in master's degree in physics from the University of Dhaka.

== Career ==
From 9 September 1992 to 14 August 1996, Ahmad served as the Ambassador of Bangladesh to Luxembourg and the European Union.

Ahmad served as the Ambassador of Bangladesh to the United States from January 2002 to March 2005. On 24 January 2003, he met with Michael Garcia, Commissioner of Immigration and Naturalization Service, and expressed his concerns over the treatment of Bangladeshi citizens in the United States. He also met with local Bangladeshi community leaders, including Awami League leader Khalid Hasan, to discuss changes in immigration policy of the United States regarding Bangladesh. Ahmad while ambassador wrote a letter to Prime Minister Khaleda Zia on 8 December 2003 seeking her intervention in the arrest of a businessman in Moulvibazar, who risked being tortured in custody according to Amnesty International.

In July 2004, Ahmed met with Charles B Rangel, U.S. House of Representatives from New York, to discuss Bangladesh getting duty-free access for the garment industry; point out that African LDCs enjoy duty free benefit but not Asian LDCs.
