= Manzoor Ahmed Choudhury =

Bangladeshi diplomat

- মনজুর আহমেদ চৌধুরী
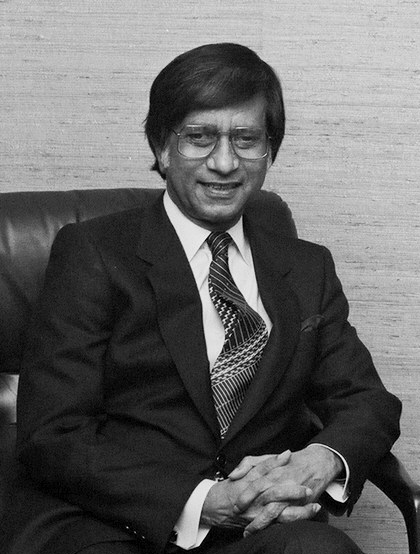
- Choudhury at the European Union in Brussels (1983)

Ambassador of Bangladesh to Belgium and the European Union
- In office 8 October 1982 – 29 July 1985
- Preceded by: Faruq Ahmed Choudhury
- Succeeded by: Mohammed Mohsin

Ambassador of Bangladesh to Japan
- In office 2 July 1979 – 22 September 1982
- Preceded by: Mostafa Kamal
- Succeeded by: M. Matiur Rahman

Manzoor Ahmed Choudhury is a retired Bangladeshi diplomat. He served as the ambassador of Bangladesh to Belgium and the European Union during 1982–1985 and Japan during 1979–1982.
