= Muhammad Zamir =

Former ambassador and chief information officer of Bangladesh

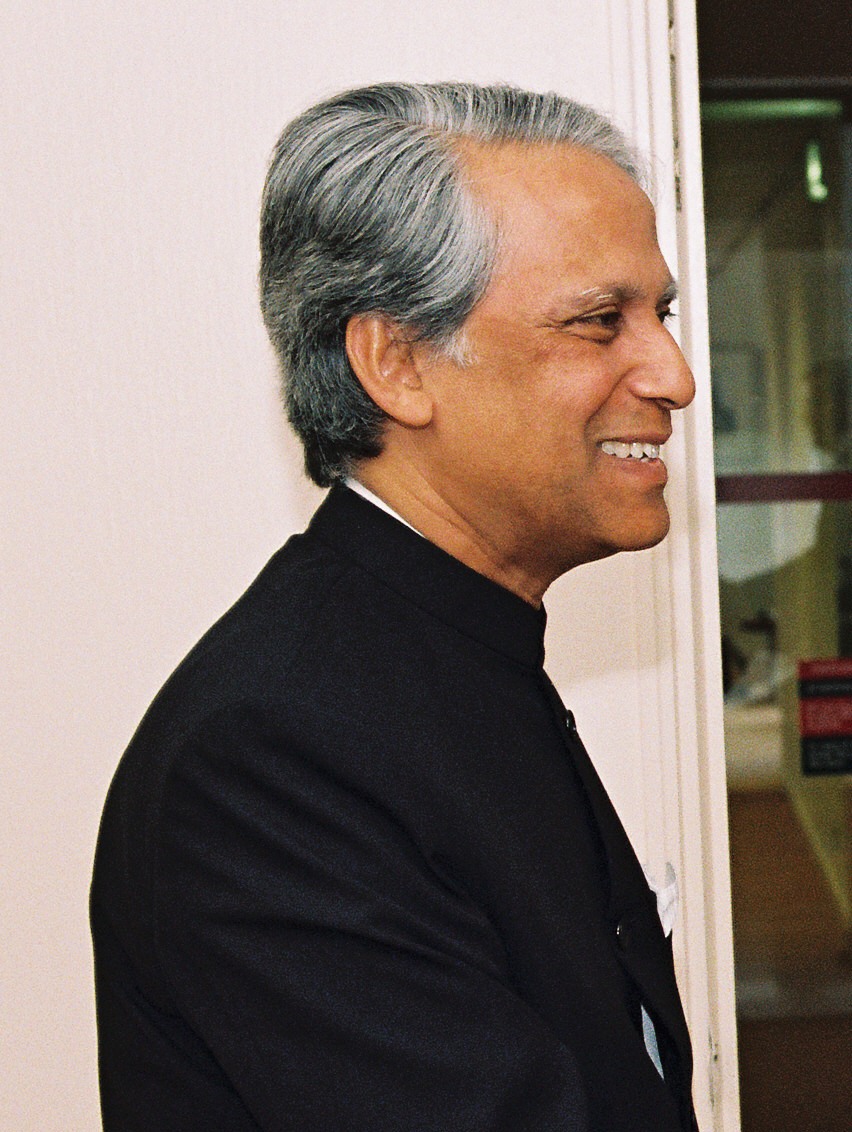
- Zamir at the European Union in Brussels (2000)

Bangladesh Ambassador to Belgium, Luxembourg and the European Union
- In office 1 April 2000 – 25 August 2002
- Preceded by: A.S.M. Khairul Anam
- Succeeded by: Syed Maudud Ali

Ambassador of Bangladesh to Italy
- In office 24 May 1997 – 26 March 2000
- Preceded by: Khurshid Hamid
- Succeeded by: Mohammad Ziauddin

Personal details
- Occupation: Diplomat

Muhammad Zamir is a former ambassador and chief information officer of Bangladesh. He is a former secretary.

== Career ==
In 1971 during the Bangladesh Liberation War, Zamir was stationed at the Embassy of Pakistan in Egypt and studying Arabic. He received a cover message from the Provisional Government of Bangladesh through the Indian Embassy in Egypt to spread information on behalf of the Bengali government in exile which he agreed to do.

Zamir was the ambassador of Bangladesh to the European Union based in Brussel in 2003.

On 31 March 2010 was appointed chief information commissioner of the Information Commission. Mohammad Abu Taher, retired secretary, and professor Sadeka Halim were his commissioners. His disagreed with the Anti-Corruption Commission decision to ban journalists from its office. He also disagreed with the director general of Directorate General of Drug Administration Major General Abul Kalam Azad who refused to talk to journalists and said they were "not authorized" to speak with him.

Zamir served as the chief information commissioner of the Information Commission to 3 September 2012. He held the rank of a cabinet minister.

In September 2012, Zamir was appointed to the advisory council of the president of the Awami League, Sheikh Hasina. From July 2012 to June 2015, was a member of the independent appeals panel of the Asian Development Bank.

Zamir is the president of Bangladesh Folklore Research Center. He is the chairman of Bangladesh Renewable Energy Society.

In July 2017, Zamir was elected to the Independent Permanent Human Rights Commission of the Organisation of Islamic Cooperation.
