= K. M. Shehabuddin =

Bangladeshi diplomat

- কে. এম. শেহাবুদ্দিন

Ambassador of Bangladesh to the United States
- In office November 1996 – March 2001
- Preceded by: Humayun Kabir
- Succeeded by: Tariq Ahmed Karim

Ambassador of Bangladesh to France
- Succeeded by: Tufail Karim Haider

Personal details
- Born: 11 April 1937 Chittagong, Bengal Province, British India
- Died: 15 April 2015 (aged 78) Dhaka, Bangladesh

K.M. Shehabuddin (11 April 1937 – 15 April 2015) was the first Bangladeshi diplomat, and is known for defecting from the Pakistani Foreign Service before the formation of the Mujibnagar government.

== Early life ==
Shehabuddin was born on 11 April 1937 in Chandnaish, Chittagong in the then British India.

== Career ==
Shehabuddin joined the Pakistan Civil Service in 1966. He was posted in the Pakistan High Commission in New Delhi in 1971 as the second secretary. At the start of the Bangladesh Liberation War, he resigned from the Pakistan Foreign Service on 6 April 1971 and pledged allegiance to Bangladesh, along with his colleague Amjadul Huq. After the independence of Bangladesh, he served as the country's ambassador to the United States, France, Spain, Poland, Colombia, Mexico, Guatemala, and Kuwait. He retired from the diplomatic service in 2001.

In 2006, UPL published Shehabuddin's autobiography, There and Back Again: A Diplomat's Tale.

== Death ==
Shehabuddin died on 15 April 2015. In 2016, he was awarded the Independence Day Award, the highest civilian honor of Bangladesh, posthumously.
