= Tariq Ahmed Karim =

Bangladeshi diplomat

- তারিক আহমদ করিম
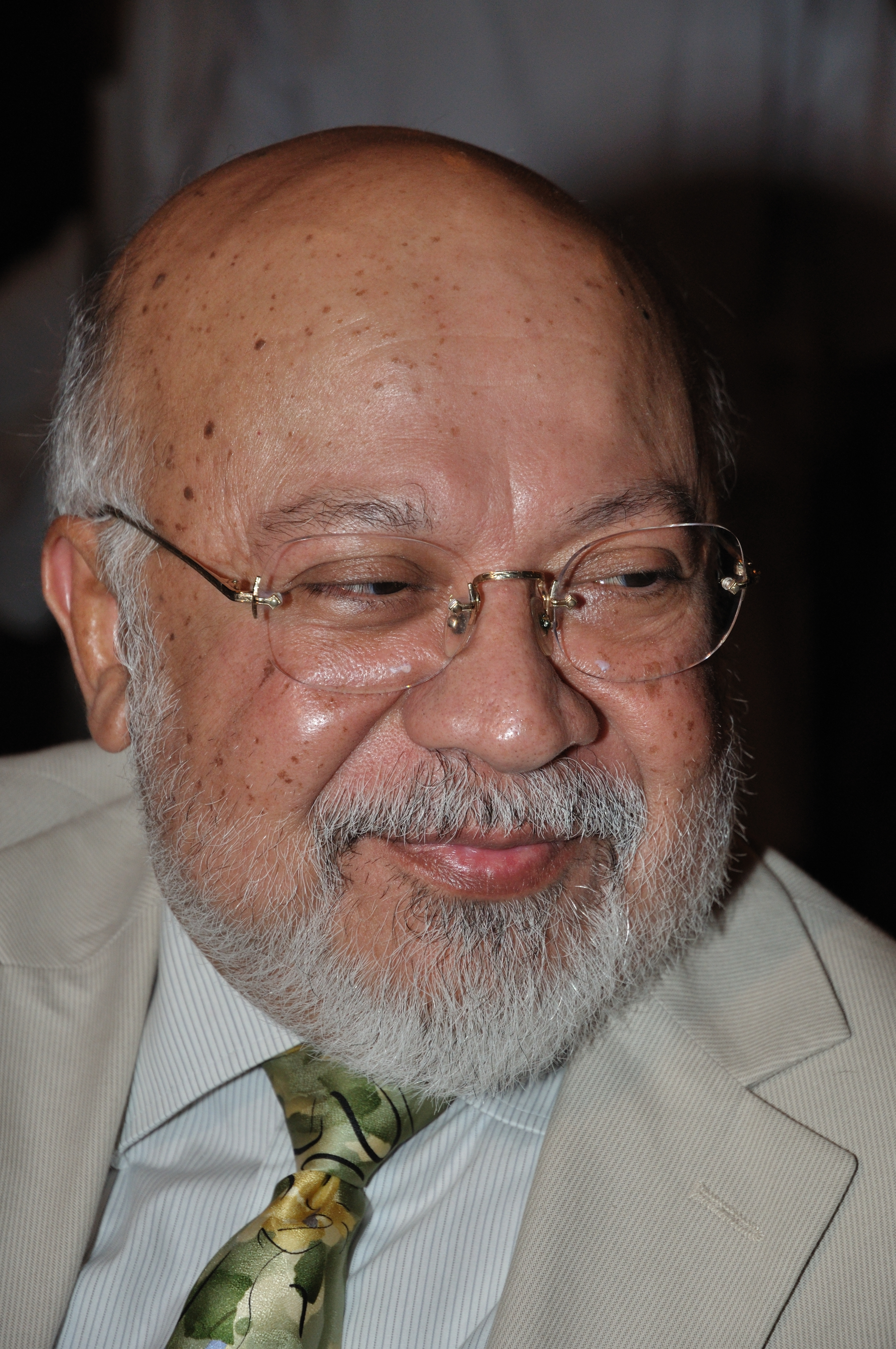
- Karim in 2011

High Commissioner of Bangladesh to India
- In office August 2009 – October 2014
- Preceded by: Liaquat Ali Chowdhury
- Succeeded by: Syed Muazzem Ali

Ambassador of Bangladesh to the United States
- In office 12 April 2001 – January 2002
- Preceded by: K. M. Shehabuddin
- Succeeded by: Syed Hasan Ahmad

Personal details
- Born: 1942 or 1943 (age 83–84)
- Education: University of Dhaka (BA); University of Maryland, College Park (MA)

Tariq Ahmed Karim (born 1942 or 1943) is a Bangladeshi diplomat and former ambassador to the United States and the former High Commissioner to India. He also served as chairman of the Bangladesh Institute of International and Strategic Studies.

== Education ==
Karim completed his secondary education at St. Gregory's High School and College in 1960 and higher secondary from Notre Dame College, Dhaka, in 1962.. He earned a BA in English literature in 1965 from the University of Dhaka and started his career. After retirement he received an MA in government and politics from the University of Maryland, College Park, in 2007.

== Career ==
Karim joined the Foreign Service of Pakistan in 1967. In March 1972, when he was a second secretary in Tehran, he defected to Bangladesh along with four other embassy personnel. The Bangladeshi Ministry of Foreign Affairs said that in its early years "he played an important role in creating" its personnel and administration departments.

Karim also served in the Bangladesh missions in Bangkok and London. He was deputy high commissioner to India from July 1984 to August 1988. From 1988 to 1991, he was deputy chief of mission in Beijing. In 1991, he returned to Iran as ambassador, a post he held until 1995.

From March 1995 to March 1997, Karim was an additional foreign secretary, responsible for South Asia and SAARC. He was the lead Bangladeshi negotiator over sharing the water of the Ganges and successfully signed a 30-year treaty in 1996. From 1997 to 1998, Karim was the high commissioner of Bangladesh to South Africa. He also represented Bangladesh in Botswana, Lesotho, and Namibia concurrently.

Karim retired voluntarily from the Bangladesh foreign service at the end of 1998. To pursue graduate studies, he joined the Department of Government & Politics at the University of Maryland, College Park (UMD) in 1999 on a Ford Foundation fellowship. He returned to diplomacy to be the ambassador of Bangladesh to the United States from March 2001 until January 2002. Then he resumed working at UMD as a senior advisor at the Center for Institutional Reforms and the Informal Sector (IRIS) until 2005. He was also an adjunct faculty member at UMD, as well as at George Washington University and Virginia International University, from 2003 to 2008.

In July 2009, Karim was appointed the high commissioner of Bangladesh to India by Prime Minister Sheikh Hasina and served until October 2014.

Karim joined BRAC University as a visiting fellow in May 2018.

As of June 2025, Karim is an advisor of the Centre for Bay of Bengal Studies (CBoBS) based in the Independent University, Bangladesh.

In January 2021, he joined the Cosmos Foundation, a trustee of the Cosmos Group, as an advisor. In January 2025, Karim took the role of the president of the Bay of Bengal Institute, an initiative under the Cosmos Foundation.

Karim has been a distinguished visiting research fellow at the Institute for South Asian Studies of the National University of Singapore since 2022, and a member of the Board of Advisors of the National Bureau of Asian Research (NBR) of Seattle, WA, and Washington DC since 2021.

== Personal life ==
Karim is married to Naghma Karim. He has a daughter and two sons.

Entrepreneur Latifur Rahman was Karim's second cousin.
