= Shamsher M. Chowdhury =

Bangladeshi diplomat (born 1950)

Shamsher M. Chowdhury Bir Bikrom
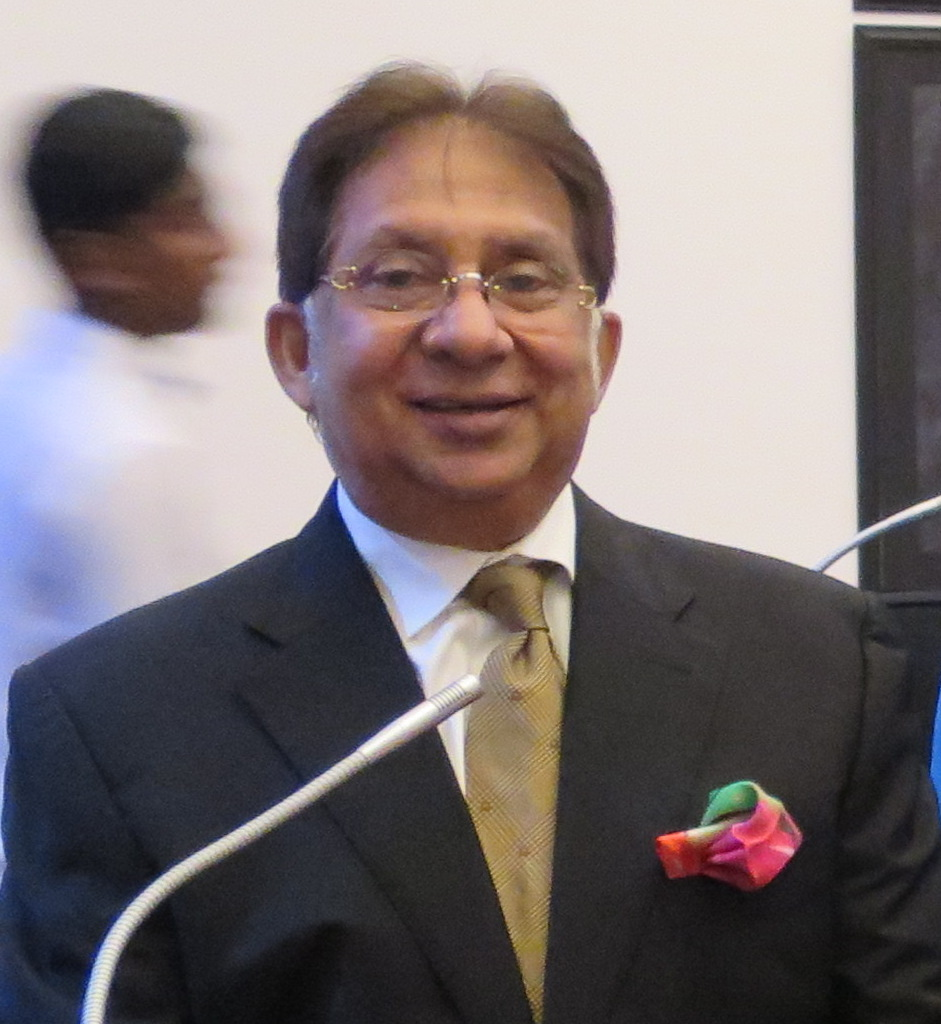

Ambassador to the United States
- In office 2005–2007
- Preceded by: Syed Hasan Ahmad
- Succeeded by: M. Humayun Kabir

Foreign Secretary
- In office October 2001 – March 2005
- Preceded by: Syed Muazzem Ali
- Succeeded by: Hemayet Uddin

Other ambassadorial posts
- 1998–2001: Ambassador to Vietnam
- 1995–1998: Ambassador to Germany

High Commissioner of Bangladesh to Sri Lanka
- In office 8 October 1991 – 27 November 1995
- Preceded by: Abdur Rahman
- Succeeded by: Masum Ahmed Chowdhury

Personal details
- Born: 1950 (age 75–76)
- Spouse: Shahida Yasmin
- Awards: Bir Bikrom

Military service
- Allegiance: Pakistan (before 1971); Bangladesh
- Branch: Pakistan Army; Bangladesh Army
- Service years: 1969–1975
- Rank: Major
- Unit: Army Education Corps
- Commands: CoCO − Sector V; GSO-2 − 55th Infantry; Adjt − Sylhet Cadet College
- Conflict: Bangladesh Liberation War

Shamsher M. Chowdhury Bir Bikrom is a Bangladeshi diplomat and served as the foreign secretary from October 2001 to March 2005. He also served as the ambassador of Bangladesh to Sri Lanka, Germany, Vietnam, and the United States.

Chowdhury was arrested after the fall of the Awami League government.

== Early life ==
Chowdhury was born on 1 May 1950 in Chittagong, East Pakistan, Pakistan. His parents were Abdul Mubeen Chowdhury and Tahmeed-un-Nahar. His paternal home is in Sylhet District. He graduated with a Bachelor of Arts degree from the Pakistan Military Academy and was commissioned in the Pakistan Army in 1969. He served in the 1st East Bengal Regiment in Jessore and the 8th East Bengal Regiment in Chittagong during his career with the Pakistan Army.

Chowdhury revolted against the Pakistan Army and fought in the Bangladesh Liberation War in 1971. He served under Harun Ahmed Chowdhury. He was wounded and taken prisoner on 11 April and freed after the surrender of Pakistan on 16 December. He was awarded the gallantry award "Bir Bikram" in 1972. He served in the Bangladesh Army till 1974, reaching the rank of major. Chowdhury speaks German and Italian, and has a working knowledge of French and Urdu.

== Career ==
Chowdhury joined the Bangladesh Civil Service (Foreign Affairs) in January 1975. He served as the deputy chief of protocol and director (West Europe) in the Foreign Ministry from 1975 to 1978. He was posted to the Bangladesh Embassy in Rome from 1978 to 1982. He served as counselor in the Bangladesh Embassy in Washington from 1982 to 1983.

Chowdhury was the counsellor and minister in the Bangladesh High Commission in Ottawa from 1983 to 1986. He served as deputy chief of mission/minister in the Bangladesh Embassy in Beijing from 1986 to 1988. From 1988 to 1991, he attended the Senior Staff Course at the Bangladesh Public Administration Training Centre. From 1991 to 1995, he was the high commissioner of Bangladesh to Sri Lanka. From 1995 to 1998, he was the ambassador of Bangladesh to the Federal Republic of Germany. He was the ambassador of Bangladesh to the Socialist Republic of Vietnam from 1998 to 2001.

Chowdhury represented Bangladesh at international conferences in the FAO, World Food Programme and Non-Aligned meetings. He was also member of the Bangladesh delegation to several Commonwealth summits and SAARC summits. He also represented Bangladesh in ICPE Assembly meetings in Slovenia.

Chowdhury served as foreign secretary from October 2001 to March 2005. Chowdhury finally served as Bangladesh ambassador to United States from 2005 to 2007. Chowdhury wrote an article for The Wall Street Journal in which he criticized the government targeting Grameen Bank and Mohammad Yunus and viewing as part of wider problems with democracy in Bangladesh.

In 2015, Chowdhury resigned from the post of vice-chairman of the Bangladesh Nationalist Party. He joined Bikalpa Dhara Bangladesh, led by AQM Badruddoza Chowdhury, in 2018. Golam Sarwar and Shafiqur Rahman also joined Bikalpa Dhara Bangladesh with Chowdhury through presenting flowers to AQM Badruddoza Chowdhury. He was nominated to contest the 2018 general election from Sylhet-6 as a candidate of Bikalpa Dhara, which was in an alliance with the Awami League. He quit the election after the Awami League-led grand alliance nominated Nurul Islam Nahid.

In September 2023, Chowdhury became chairman of Trinomool BNP, founded by Nazmul Huda, in September 2023. He led the Trinomool BNP into participating in the 2024 general election. He, and all the candidates of his party including Taimur Alam Khandaker lost in the election. Chowdhury came third with 10,000 votes while Nurul Islam Nahid of the Awami League won the election with 57,758 votes.

Chowdhury was prevented from leaving Bangladesh on 17 October 2024 after the fall of the Sheikh Hasina-led Awami League government. He was supposed to fly to Thailand for medical treatment. He was arrested by the Detective Branch from his home in Banani DOHS that night according to deputy commissioner Muhammad Talebur Rabman. According to the police, he was arrested in a case filed by the Bangladesh Nationalist Party on 14 September over an attack on their office on 28 October 2023 and taken to the headquarters of the Detective Branch. Dhaka Metropolitan Public Prosecutor Omar Faruq Faruqi opposed his bail, calling him a "turncoat" for leaving the Bangladesh Nationalist Party.
