= Mohammad Ziauddin =

Bangladesh diplomat

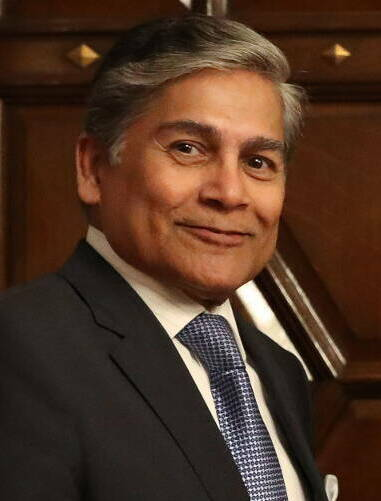
- Ziauddin in 2018

Ambassador-at-large of the Prime Minister
- In office 24 November 2009 – 5 August 2024
- Prime Minister: Sheikh Hasina

21st Bangladesh Ambassador to the United States
- In office 18 September 2014 – 3 September 2020
- President: Abdul Hamid
- Preceded by: Akramul Qader
- Succeeded by: M Shahidul Islam

Ambassador of Bangladesh to Italy
- In office 15 May 2000 – 1 August 2003
- Preceded by: Muhammad Zamir
- Succeeded by: Anwarul Bar Chowdhury

Personal details
- Born: 1946 (age 79–80)
- Education: University of Dhaka

Mohammad Ziauddin is a Bangladeshi diplomat and the former Ambassador-at-large of the Prime Minister of Bangladesh. He is the former Ambassador of Bangladesh to the United States.

== Early life and education ==
Ziauddin graduated from St Gregory's High School. He completed his Intermediate of Humanities from Notre Dame College, Dhaka; BA Honors and MA in English literature from the University of Dhaka.

== Career ==
Ziauddin served in the Bangladesh High Commission in London; Bangladesh High Commission in Nairobi, Kenya; and Permanent Mission of Bangladesh to the United Nations, New York. He has served as the Bangladesh Ambassador to Italy, Director General (International Organizations) in the Ministry of Foreign Affairs, and Chief of Protocol to the Government of Bangladesh.

He served as the Ambassador-at-Large of Prime Minister Sheikh Hasina from 24 November 2009 to 2014. He was afterwards appointed as the Bangladesh Ambassador to the United States on 18 September 2014. In 2016 he was appointed as the first Ambassador (non-resident) to Guyana. He was also made the first (non-resident) ambassador to Belize. On 7 May 2021, he was again appointed Ambassador-at-Large of Prime Minister Sheikh Hasina with the rank of a Cabinet Minister.

== Personal life ==
Ziauddin is married to Yasmeen Ziauddin, and has two children.
