= List of Roman Catholic archbishops of Dhaka =

Archbishop of Dhaka
- Archbishopric

catholic
- Incumbent: Bejoy Nicephorus D'Cruze

Information
- First holder: Thomas Oliffe (apostolic vicar); Augustine Louage (bishop); Lawrence Leo Graner (archbishop)
- Established: 1850 (apostolic vicariate); 1886 (bishopric); 1950 (archbishopric)
- Archdiocese: Dhaka
- Cathedral: St. Mary's Cathedral

The Archbishop of Dhaka is the head of the Roman Catholic Archdiocese of Dhaka, who is responsible for looking after its spiritual and administrative needs. As the archdiocese is the metropolitan see of the ecclesiastical province encompassing nearly all of the Dhaka Division, the Archbishop of Dhaka also administers the bishops who head the suffragan dioceses of Dinajpur, Mymensingh, Rajshahi and Sylhet. The current archbishop is Bejoy Nicephorus D'Cruze.

The archdiocese began as the Apostolic Vicariate of Eastern Bengal, which was created on February 12, 1850. Thomas Oliffe was appointed its first vicar. On September 1, 1886, the vicariate was elevated to the status of diocese by Pope Leo XIII. It was renamed as the Diocese of Dacca after its see in 1887. Augustin Louage was appointed its first bishop. On account of the population increase, the Holy See decided to elevate the diocese to the status of archdiocese on July 15, 1950. Lawrence Leo Graner became the first archbishop of the newly formed metropolitan see.

Six men have been Archbishop of Dhaka; another Five were bishop of its predecessor diocese. One of them was elevated to the College of Cardinals. Theotonius Amal Ganguly, the eleventh ordinary of the archdiocese, was the first archbishop to be born in the Bangladesh, as well as the first born in Dhaka. Patrick D’Rozario became the first cardinal from Bangladesh in 2016. Michael Rozario had the longest tenure as Archbishop of Dhaka, serving for 28 years from 1977 to 2005, while Louage held the position for 42 months (1890–1894), marking the shortest episcopacy.

== List of ordinaries ==
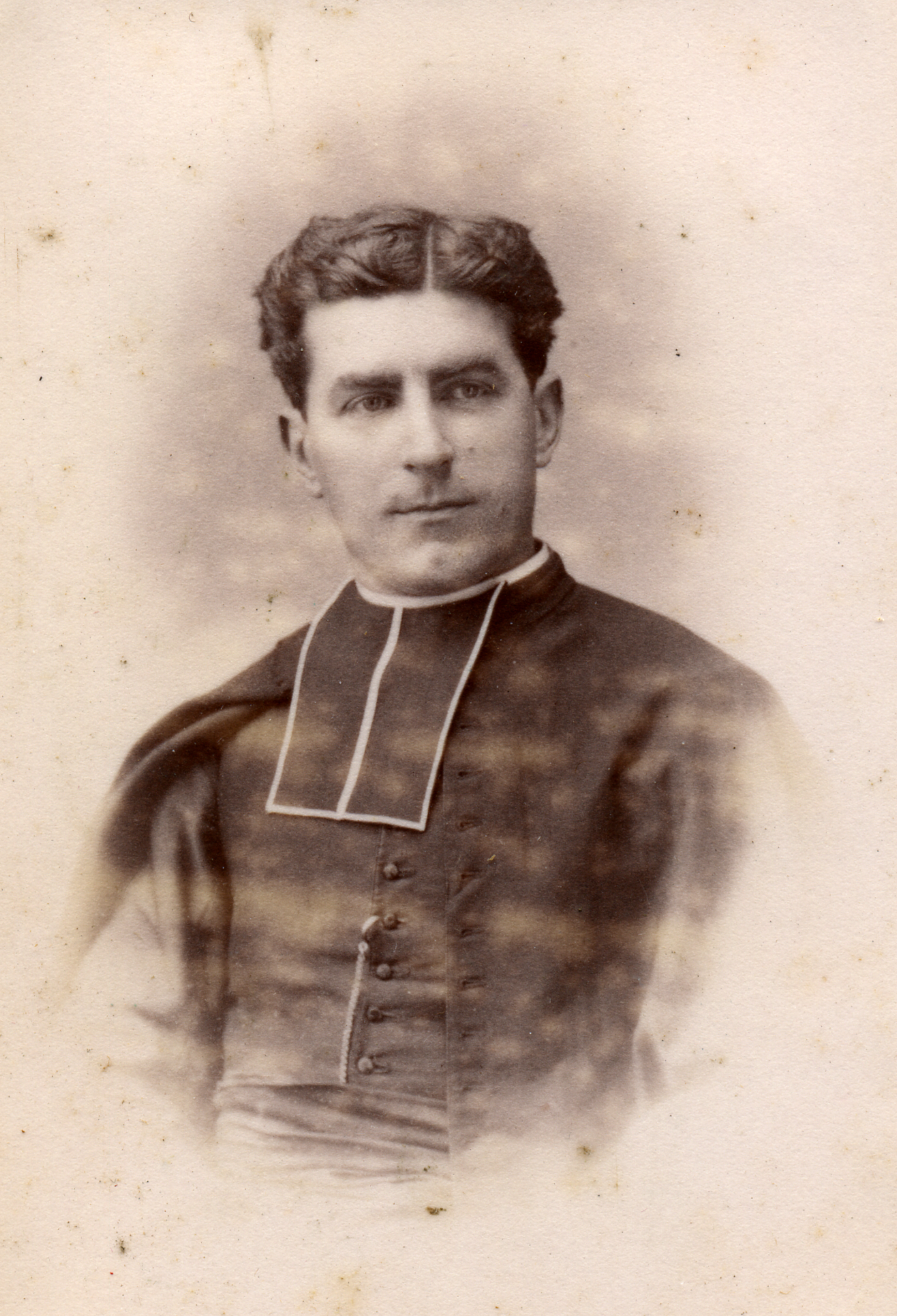
Pierre Dufal, the third Apostolic Vicar of Eastern Bengal.

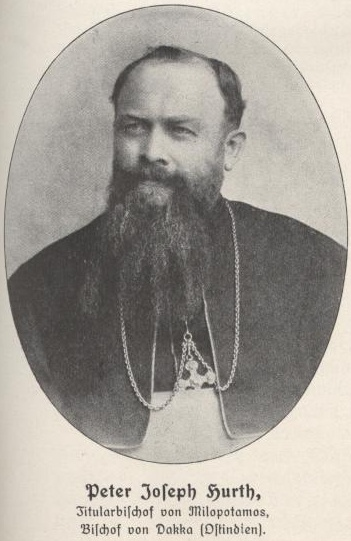
Peter Joseph Hurth, the second Bishop of Dacca.

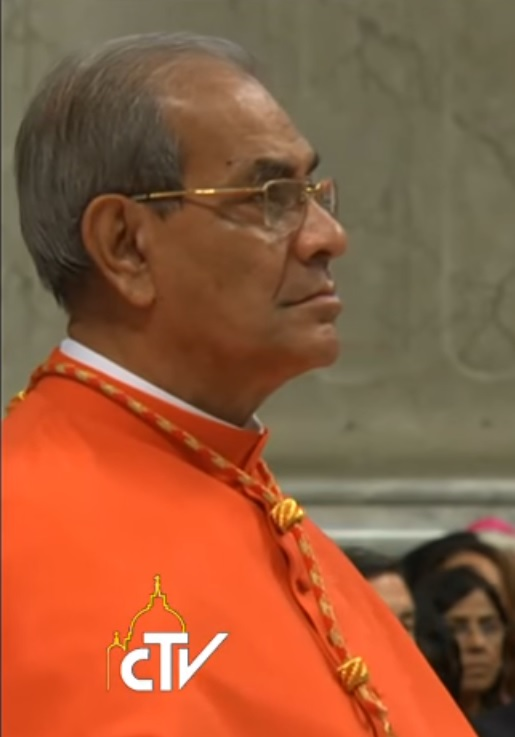
Patrick D’Rozario, the first Bangladeshi cardinal

Key
‡	Denotes archbishop who was elevated to the College of Cardinals
CSC	Congregation of Holy Cross
OMI	Missionary Oblates of Mary Immaculate
OSB	Order of Saint Benedict

=== Apostolic Vicars ===
From	Until	Incumbent	Notes	Ref(s)
1850	1855	Thomas Oliffe	Appointed on February 15, 1850. Transferred to Western Bengal on November 2, 1855.	
1855	1860	Louis Verité, CSC	Appointed Pro apostolic vicar on June 6, 1856.	
1860	1876	Pierre Dufal, CSC	Appointed on July 3, 1860. Resigned on July 28, 1876.	
1878	1886	Jordan Ballsieper, OSB	Appointed on April 5, 1878. Died on March 1, 1890.	

=== Bishops ===
From	Until	Incumbent	Notes	Ref(s)
1890	1894	Augustine Joseph Louage, CSC	Appointed on November 21, 1890. Died on June 8, 1894.	
1894	1909	Peter Joseph Hurth, CSC	Appointed on June 26, 1894. Resigned on February 15, 1909.	
1909	1915	Frederick Linneborn, CSC	Appointed on February 13, 1909. Died on July 21, 1915.	
1916	1929	Amand-Théophile-Joseph Legrand, CSC	Appointed on August 16, 1916. (Note: Legrand was appointed bishop on August 16, 1916, but only received episcopal consecration on November 5, 1916.) Retired on November 9, 1929. Died on April 10, 1937	
1929	1945	Timothy Joseph Crowley, CSC	Coadjutor bishop (Note: Under the Code of Canon Law, the coadjutor bishop has the right of succession (cum jure successionis) upon the death, retirement or resignation of the diocesan bishop he is assisting.) from 1927 to 1929. (Note: Crowley was appointed coadjutor archbishop on January 26, 1927, but only received episcopal consecration on May 1, 1927.) Died on October 2, 1945.	
1947	1950	Lawrence Leo Graner, CSC	Appointed on February 13, 1947 (Note: Graner was appointed bishop on February 13, 1947, but only received episcopal consecration on April 23, 1947.)	

=== Archbishops ===
From	Until	Incumbent	Notes	Ref(s)
1950	1967	Lawrence Leo Graner, CSC	Became the first Archbishop of Dhaka on July 15, 1950. Resigned on November 23, 1967. Died on April 21, 1982	
1967	1977	Theotonius Amal Ganguly, CSC	Auxiliary bishop from 1960 to 1965. (Note: Ganguly was appointed auxiliary bishop on September 3, 1960, but only received episcopal consecration on October 7, 1960.) Coadjutor archbishop from 1965 to 1967. Appointed on November 23, 1967. First archbishop to be born in Bangladesh and in Dhaka. Died on September 2, 1977.	
1977	2005	Michael Rozario	Appointed on December 17, 1977. Retired on July 9, 2005. Died on March 18, 2007.	
2005	2011	Paulinus Costa	Appointed on July 9, 2005. Retired on October 22, 2011. Died on January 3, 2015.	
2011	2020	Patrick D'Rozario, CSC^{‡}	Coadjutor Archbishop from 2010 to 2011. Elevated to cardinal on November 19, 2016. Retired on September 30, 2020	
2020	present	Bejoy Nicephorus D'Cruze, OMI	Appointed on September 30, 2020.	
