= Archbishop's House =

Church in Dhaka, Bangladesh

Coordinates: 23.736°N 90.405°E

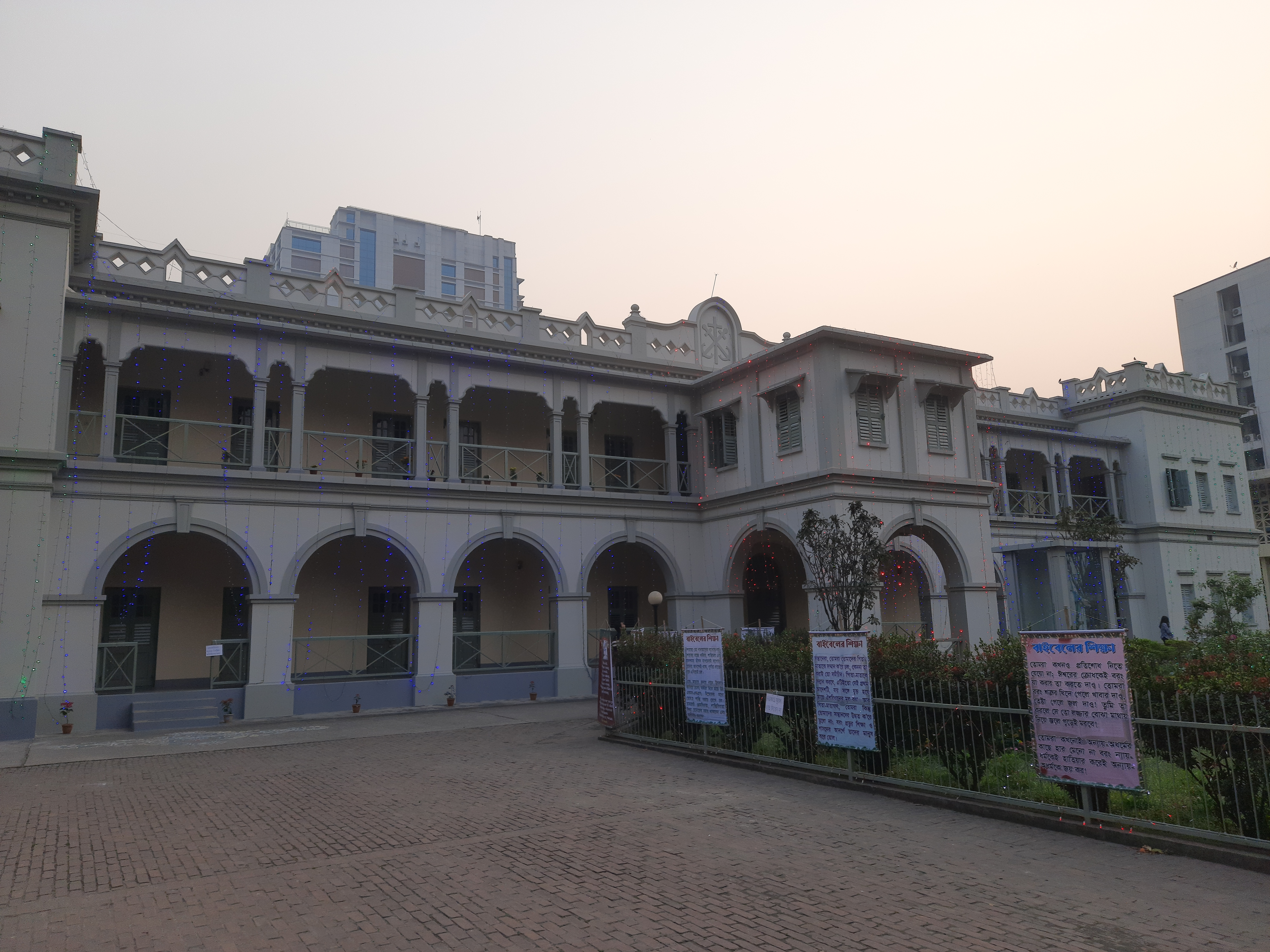
Archbishop's House

Archbishop House (Bengali: আর্চ বিশপ হাউস) also known as Kakrail Church is an architecturally significant residence and church situated in Kakrail, Ramna Thana, Dhaka, Bangladesh. It was first built in 1925, with a chapel on the east end. It had evolved 1947 in Lakkibazar (Puran Dhaka) and in 1957 it transferred to Kakrail. The present church was renovated in 1976. There are Gothic and Renaissance motifs inside and outside the structure and it is considered to be a fine example of post colonial fusion architecture. The Daily Star reported in 2009 that official listing as a national heritage site was imminent, but six years later the Department of Archaeology was still preparing the list of buildings to be preserved.

The Roman Catholic Archdiocese of Dhaka is the only archdiocese in Bangladesh. Archbishop Patrick D'Rozario, CSC, D.D currently resides. East of the house, within the same compound, lies St. Mary's Cathedral, built in 1956. Fr. Gabriel Corraya is parish priest of St. Mary's Cathedral. St. Joseph's Seminary is also situated in the same boundary. Fr. Milton D. Corraya is the rector of the seminary and spiritual rector is Fr. Jyoti A. Gomes.

Two graves lie at the front of Archbishop House, containing the bodies of Archbishop Theotonius Amal Ganguly and Archbishop Michael Rozario.

== Community ==
- Most Rev. Patrick D'Rozario CSC, D.D
- Parish Priest : Fr. Gabriel Corraya
- Asst. Priest : Fr. Kakon Luke Corraya

== Former Archbishops of Dhaka ==
The Archdiocese was established 15 July 1951. The Archbishops have been:

- 1947-1964 : Most Rev. Lawrence Leo Graner, CSC
- 1967-1979 : Most Rev. Theotonius Amal Ganguly, CSC
- 1978-2001 : Most Rev. Michael Rozario
- 2005-2014 : Most Rev. Paulinus Costa

== See also ==
- Roman Catholicism in Bangladesh
- List of Roman Catholic dioceses in Bangladesh
