= List of Catholic dioceses in Bangladesh =

The Roman Catholic Church in Bangladesh is composed solely of a Latin hierarchy, joint in the national Episcopal Conference of Bangladesh (the former East Pakistan), comprising only two Latin ecclesiastical provinces, under the Metropolitans of the Archdioceses of Dhaka and of Chittagong, which together have a total of six suffragan dioceses.

Unlike India, there are no Eastern Catholic sees. Neither are there pre-diocesan or other exempt jurisdictions. There are no titular sees, nor defunct jurisdictions without current successor sees.

There is an Apostolic Nunciature to Bangladesh as papal diplomatic representation (embassy-level).

== List of dioceses ==
Ecclesiastical jurisdictions	Latin name	Type	Church	Ecclesiastical province	Established	Area (km^{2})
Barisal	Barisalensis	Diocese	Latin	Chittagong	29 December 2015	20,7
Chittagong	Chittagongensis	Metropolitan Archdiocese	Latin	Chittagong	25 May 1927	27,6
Dhaka	Dhakensis	Metropolitan Archdiocese	Latin	Dhaka	15 February 1850	14,193
Dinajpur	Dinaipurensis	Diocese	Latin	Dhaka	25 May 1927	16,018
Khulna	Khulnensis	Diocese	Latin	Chittagong	3 January 1952	25,855
Mymensingh	Mymensinghensis	Diocese	Latin	Dhaka	15 May 1987	16,448
Rajshahi	Raishahiensis	Diocese	Latin	Dhaka	21 May 1990	11,467
Sylhet	Sylhetensis	Diocese	Latin	Dhaka	8 July 2011	12,595
Joypurhat	Joypurhatina	Diocese	Latin	Dhaka	25 March 2026	7,018

== See also ==
- List of Catholic dioceses (structured view)
