= Sebastian Tudu =

Bangladeshi Catholic bishop

The Most Reverend Sebastian Tudu
- Bishop of Dinajpur
- Church: Roman Catholic Church
- Archdiocese: Roman Catholic Archdiocese of Dhaka
- Diocese: Roman Catholic Diocese of Dinajpur
- Installed: October 29, 2011
- Predecessor: Moses Costa

Orders
- Ordination: December 30, 1999
- Consecration: January 27, 2012 by Joseph Salvador Marino
- Rank: Bishop

Personal details
- Born: Sebastian Tudu; June 17, 1967 Changura, Ghoraghat, Gaibandha, Bangladesh
- Denomination: Roman Catholic
- Residence: Dinajpur, Bangladesh
- Education: Notre Dame College, Dhaka; Pontifical Urban University
- Motto: Thy Kingdom Come

Ordination history of Sebastian Tudu
History
Episcopal consecration
- Principal consecrator: Joseph Salvador Marino, Titular Archbishop of Natchitoches
- Co-consecrators: Moses Montu Costa, C.S.C. Bishop of Chittagong; Patrick D’Rozario, C.S.C. Archbishop of Dhaka
- Source(s):"Bishop Sebastian Tudu". Catholic-Hierarchy.

Sebastian Tudu (born June 17, 1967) is a Bangladeshi Catholic priest. He is the seventh and current Bishop of Dinajpur, having been appointed by Pope Benedict XVI in 2011. He is the first Santali Bishop in Bangladesh.

== Early life and education ==
Sebastian Tudu Marino was born in Changura, a village of Gaibandha District, on June 17, 1967. He completed his secondary education at St. Joseph Higher Secondary School and higher secondary education at Dinajpur Government School. Then he moved to Dhaka and got admitted into Notre Dame College. He earned a Bachelor of Arts degree from there while living at St. Joseph's Minor Seminary. He also attended Holy Spirit Major Seminary later. He earned a doctoral degree in missiology at Pontifical Urban University in Rome from 2003 to 2007.

== Career ==
Tudu was ordained a priest on December 30, 1999, at Mariampur parish, Dinajpur. In 2000 he became the assistant priest of St. Francis Parish. But, in 2003, he left Bangladesh for higher education. He returned to Bangladesh in 2007 and was appointed as an assistant priest of Fatima Rani Church. After 2009 he worked as vice-rector of the Holy Spirit Major Seminary, located in Dhaka.

On October 29, 2011, Pope Benedict XVI appointed him as the seventh bishop of Dinajpur. He was ordained a bishop on January 27, 2012, at Dinajpur by Joseph Salvador Marino. He is also a member of Catholic Bishops’ Conference of Bangladesh and Caritas Bangladesh.

Catholic Church titles
Preceded by Moses Costa	Bishop of Dinajpur; 2011–present	Incumbent
