= Holy Rosary Church, Dhaka =

Holy Rosary Church
- হলি রোজারি চার্চ
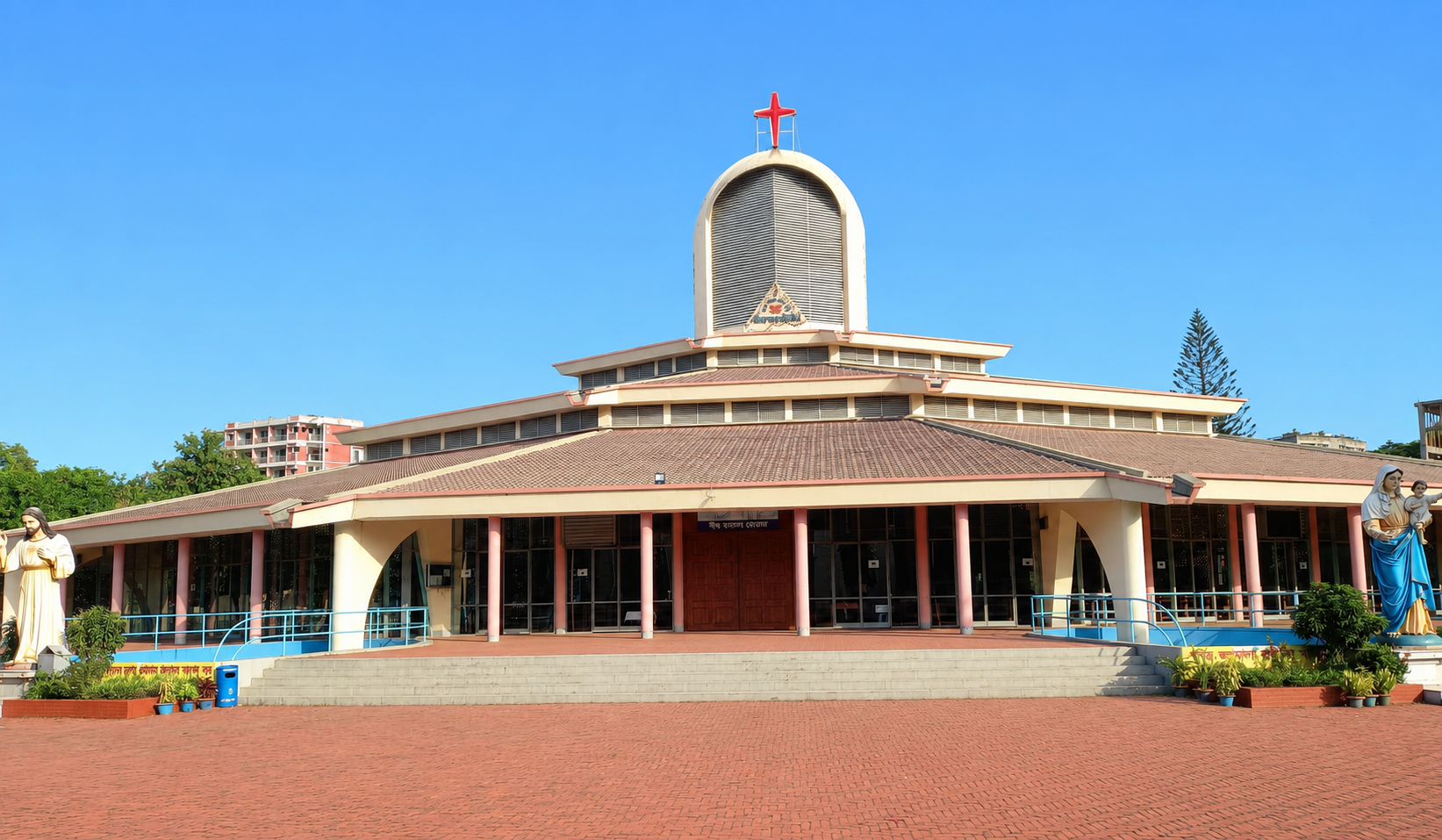
- Holy Rosary Church
- 23.7589°N 90.3921°E
- Location: Tejgaon Thana; Dhaka District
- Country: Bangladesh
- Denomination: Catholic
- Churchmanship: Latin Church

History
- Status: Church

Architecture
- Functional status: Active
- Years built: 1677

Administration
- Province: Dhaka
- Archdiocese: Archdiocese of Dhaka
- Parish: Tejgaon

Clergy
- Priest: Fr. Kamal Andreas Corraya

Holy Rosary Church is a Roman Catholic church in the Tejgaon area of Dhaka. It is also known as Tejgaon Church and once popularly called the Japmala Queen Church. Under this Catholic church has 17,120 Catholics. Fr. Kamal Andreas Corraya is parish priest of this church and Fr. Mintu Lawrence Palma, Fr. Antony Ripon D' Rozario and Fr. Sony Martin Rodrigues are serving there as assistant parish priest. Each Sunday Catholics gather there for Sunday mass and thousands devotee join there.

== Construction ==
Portuguese Augustinian missionaries introduced Christianity in Dhaka. The second church of Dhaka was built in 1677 at Tejgaon. But this one is the oldest example that can be found.

== Renovation ==
The church was renovated three times. In 1714, 1940 and the last renovation was in 2000.

The difference between the width of walls and the parts of the roof suggest that the eastern part of the Church was built later.

== Information ==
Parish Priest : Fr. Kamal Andreas Corraya Assist. Priest : Fr. Mintu Lawrence Palma Assist. Priest : Fr. Antony Ripon D' Rozario Assist. Priest : Fr. Sony Martin Rodriques Catholics : 17,120 (including Nayanagar, Uttara Banani, Mahakhali and Bhatara)

== See also ==
- Christianity in Bangladesh
- The Portuguese in Dhaka
