= James Romen Boiragi =

Bangladeshi Roman Catholic bishop

Most Reverend James Romen Boiragi
- Bishop of Khulna
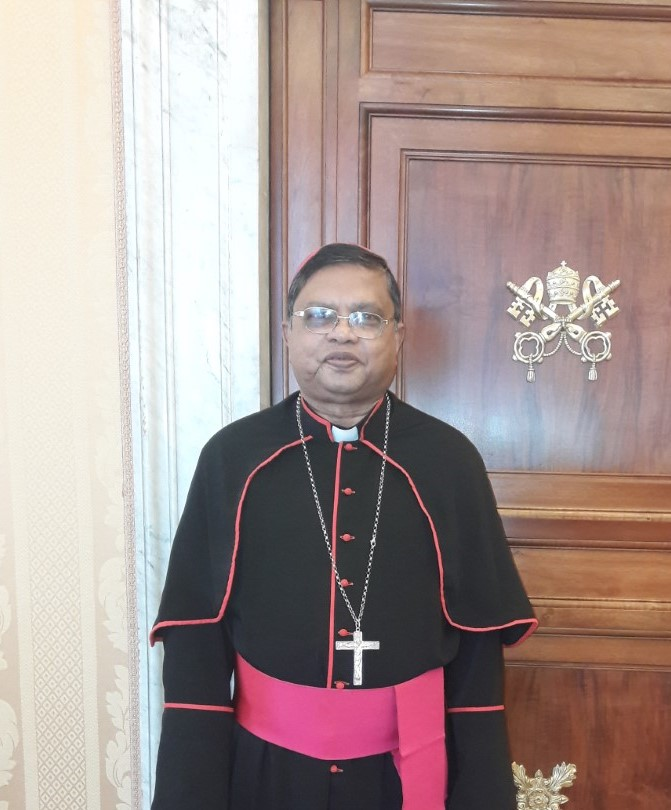
- Bishop James Romen Boiragi, bishop of the Roman Catholic Diocese of Khulna, Bangladesh
- Native name: জেমস রোমান বোয়ারাগি
- Archdiocese: Chittagong
- Diocese: Khulna
- Appointed: 2 May 2012 by Pope Benedict XVI
- Installed: 2 May 2012
- Predecessor: Bejoy Nicephorus D’Cruze, O.M.I.
- Successor: Incumbent
- Other posts: Chairman of Catholic Bishops’ Episcopal Commission for Catechetics and Biblical Apostolate
- Previous posts: Vicar General and Vice Judicial Vicar of the Tribunal for the Diocese of Khulna

Orders
- Ordination: 13 January 1985
- Consecration: 15 June 2012 by Patrick D'Rozario

Personal details
- Born: 3 May 1955 (age 71) Haldibunia, Bagerhat district, Bangladesh
- Denomination: Roman Catholic
- Education: Pontifical Urban University
- Motto: "Lead my sheep"

Bishop James Romen Boiragi is a Bangladeshi Roman Catholic bishop serving as bishop of the Roman Catholic Diocese of Khulna, Bangladesh.

== Early life ==
James was born on 3 May 1955 at Haldibunia, Bagerhat district, Bangladesh. He studied at St. Paul's High School (at Shelabunia), Notre Dame College, Dhaka, Holy Spirit Major Seminary (Dhaka). After working as a pastor at St. Joseph's Cathedral in Khulna he went for higher studies in Canon Law at Urbaniana University in Rome, Italy, where he attained his Ph.D. degree in 1996.

== Priesthood ==
He was ordained a priest on 13 January 1985 at Khulna.

== Episcopate ==
He was appointed Bishop of Khulna on 4 May 2012 by Pope Benedict XVI. His episcopal ordination took place at Khulna on 15 June 2012. His motto is "Lead my sheep". He holds the chairs of Catholic Bishops’ Episcopal Commission for Catechetics and Biblical Apostolate alongside. He worked as the Vicar General and Vice Judicial Vicar of the Tribunal for the Diocese of Khulna before being nominated bishop of the diocese on 2 May 2012.

== See also ==
- Catholic Church in Bangladesh
