= Roman Catholic Diocese of Joypurhat =

Roman Catholic diocese in Bangladesh

Diocese of Joypurhat Diœcesis Joypurhatina

Location
- Country: Bangladesh
- Ecclesiastical province: Dhaka

Statistics
- Area: 7,018 km^{2} (2,710 sq mi)
- Population: Total; Catholics: (as of 2026); 7,714,896; 24,485 (0.3%)
- Parishes: 11

Information
- Denomination: Roman Catholic
- Sui iuris church: Latin Church
- Rite: Roman Rite
- Established: 25 March 2026

Current leadership
- Pope: Leo XIV
- Bishop: Paul Gomes
- Metropolitan Archbishop: Bejoy Nicephorus D'Cruze

The Roman Catholic Diocese of Joypurhat (Latin: Diœcesis Joypurhatina) is a diocese in Bangladesh, and comprises the civil districts of Naogaon, Bogra and Joypurhat. It lies in the Ecclesiastical province of Dhaka in Bangladesh.

== History ==
First evangelisation in the region started on 29 January 1902, when Francesco Rocca of the Pontifical Institute for Foreign Missions (PIME) started working among Adivasi communities. Gradually, the Catholic faith spread from the first missionary stations in Begunbari and Andharkota to other indigenous groups such as the Mundas and Santals. The region was served first by the diocese of Dinajpur and then later, from 21 May 1990 onwards, the diocese of Rajshahi, whose territory was split from that of the diocese of Dinajpur.

On 25 March 2026, Pope Leo XIV created the diocese with territory taken from the diocese of Rajshahi and the diocese of Dinajpur. The new diocese will be a suffragan of the metropolitan archdiocese of Dhaka. Pope Leo XIV appointed Paul Gomes as the first bishop of the diocese, who previously had been the rector of the Holy Spirit Major Seminary of Banani, Dhaka. Saint Peter and Saint Paul were chosen as the new diocese's patron saints.

== Structure ==
At the time of its creation, the new diocese had a total Catholic population of 24,485 being served in 11 parishes by 8 diocesan and 7 religious priests.

== Leadership ==
Bishops of Joypurhat (Latin Church):

- Paul Gomes (to be ordained on 5 June 2026)
