= Pro-Cathedral of the Divine Mercy, Moulvibazar =

Pro-Cathedral of the Divine Mercy
- Pro-Cathedral of the Divine Mercy
- 24.4875°N 91.7663°E
- Location: Moulvibazar
- Country: Bangladesh
- Denomination: Roman Catholic Church

The Pro-Cathedral of the Divine Mercy or simply Church of the Divine Mercy is a cathedral affiliated with the Catholic Church which is located in the city of Moulvibazar (also written Moulvibazar মৌলভীবাজার)) in the district of the same name, in the northeastern part of Bangladesh, in Asia.

The temple follows the Roman or Latin rite and is the main mother church of the Diocese of Sylhet (Dioecesis Sylhetensis; সিলেট এর বিশপের এলাকা) that was created by Pope Benedict XVI in 2011 by the bull "Missionali Ecclesiae".

== See also ==
- Roman Catholicism in Bangladesh
- Pro-Cathedral
