= Chotogolla =

- Village
- Location within Bangladesh
- Coordinates: 23°40′10″N 90°7′17″E
- Country: Bangladesh
- Region: Dhaka Division
- District: Dhaka District
- Upazila: Nawabgonj Upazila

Population
  - Total: 1,000 (est)
- Time zone: UTC+6 (BST)

Choto Golla is a village in Nawabganj Upazila, Dhaka District, approximately 25 kilometres (16 mi) west of Dhaka, Bangladesh. Its area is almost eight square kilometers, and the population about 500. There are 141 households in the village. Roman Catholicism is the dominant religion. This village is the center position of Golla mission.

It is located on the banks of the Ichamottee River. St. Francis Xavier's Club is one of the notable landmarks. There is also a big playing field in the front of the club. The club was founded in 1935 and the oldest club in this territory.
