= Vazari-Didda =

Ancient Roman African city and bishopric

Africa Proconsularis (125 AD)

Vazari-Didda (or Vazari Didda) was an Ancient city and bishopric in Roman Africa, which remains a Latin Catholic titular see.

Its presumed modern site is Henchir-Badajr, in present Tunisia.

== History ==
Vazari-Didda was important enough in the Roman province of Africa Proconsularis to be one of Carthage's Metropolitan archbishopric's. Vazari-Didda, perhaps identifiable with Henchir-Badajr in today's Tunisia, remains an ancient episcopal titular see of the Roman province of Africa Proconsularis, and a suffragan of the Archdiocese of Carthage.

Among the bishops at the Council of Carthage (411), between the Catholic and Donatist bishops of Africa, was one Adeodatus, described as Publianus episcopus Bazarididacensis plebis, who declared to have no Donatist competitors in his diocese.

There was actually a certain Calipodius who was physically present in the dioces, but when he saw that this whole congregation converted to Catholic Church, he simply left the place.

However, Adeodatus title, is of uncertain identification and the geographic location of his bishopric is also uncertain in the documents.

Today Vazari-Didda survives as titular see, and the current bishop is Engelberto Polino Sánchez, auxiliary bishop of Guadalajara Jal.

== Titular see ==
Vazari-Didda was the seat of an ancient bishopric also known as Vazari-Didda. The Diocese was nominally restored as Latin Catholic titular bishopric in 1933.

It has had the following incumbents, of the lowest (episcopal) rank with an archiepiscopal (intermediary rank) exception :

Known Bishops

- Publiano (fl. 411 )
- Titular Archbishop Lawrence Leo Graner, Holy Cross Fathers (C.S.C.) (1967.11.23 – 1971.01.23), as emeritate: formerly last Bishop of Dacca (Bangladesh) (1947.02.13 – 1950.07.15), promoted first Metropolitan Archbishop of Dacca (1950.07.15 – 1967.11.23)
- Titular Bishop Gilberto Valbuena Sánchez (1972.12.09 – 1988.03.21)
- Titular Bishop Jose Serofia Palma) (1997.11.28 – 1999.01.13) as Auxiliary Bishop of Cebu (Philippines) (1997.11.28 – 1999.01.13), later Bishop of Calbayog (Philippines) (1999.01.13 – 2006.03.18), Metropolitan Archbishop of Palo (Philippines) (2006.03.18 – 2010.10.15), Metropolitan Archbishop of above Cebu (2010.10.15 – ...), President of Catholic Bishops’ Conference of the Philippines (C.B.C.P.) (2011.12.01 – 2013.12.01)
- Titular Bishop José Colin Mendoza Bagaforo (2006.02.02 – ...), Auxiliary Bishop of Cotabato (Philippines)
- Titular Bishop Martín Pérez Scemini (2004 - 2017)
- Titular Bishop Mons. Engelberto Polino Sanchez, Obispo Auxiliar de la Arquidiocesis De Guadalajara (2018- Actualidad)

== See also ==
- Vazari
- Vazi-Sarra
