= Francis Anthony Gomes =

- Bishop of Mymensingh
- Native name: ফ্রান্সিস অ্যান্থনি গোমেজ
- Church: Catholic Church
- Diocese: Diocese of Mymensingh
- In office: 15 May 1987 – 15 July 2006
- Predecessor: Diocese erected
- Successor: Paul Ponen Kubi

Orders
- Ordination: 20 December 1959 by Pope John XXIII
- Consecration: 8 September 1987 by Michael Rozario

Personal details
- Born: 10 April 1931 Rangamati, Presidency of Fort William in Bengal, British Raj, British Empire
- Died: 17 February 2011 (aged 79) Bangkok, Thailand

Francis Anthony Gomes (10 April 1931 – 17 February 2011) was the Roman Catholic bishop of the Roman Catholic Diocese of Mymensingh, Bangladesh.

Ordained in 1959, Gomes was appointed bishop of the Mymensingh Diocese in 1987 and retired in 2006.

He died on the 17 February 2011 at the age of 79.
