= Bejoy Nicephorus D'Cruze =

Archbishop of Dhaka

His Grace The Most Reverend Msgr Bejoy Nicephorus D'Cruze O.M.I.
- Metropolitan Archbishop of Dhaka
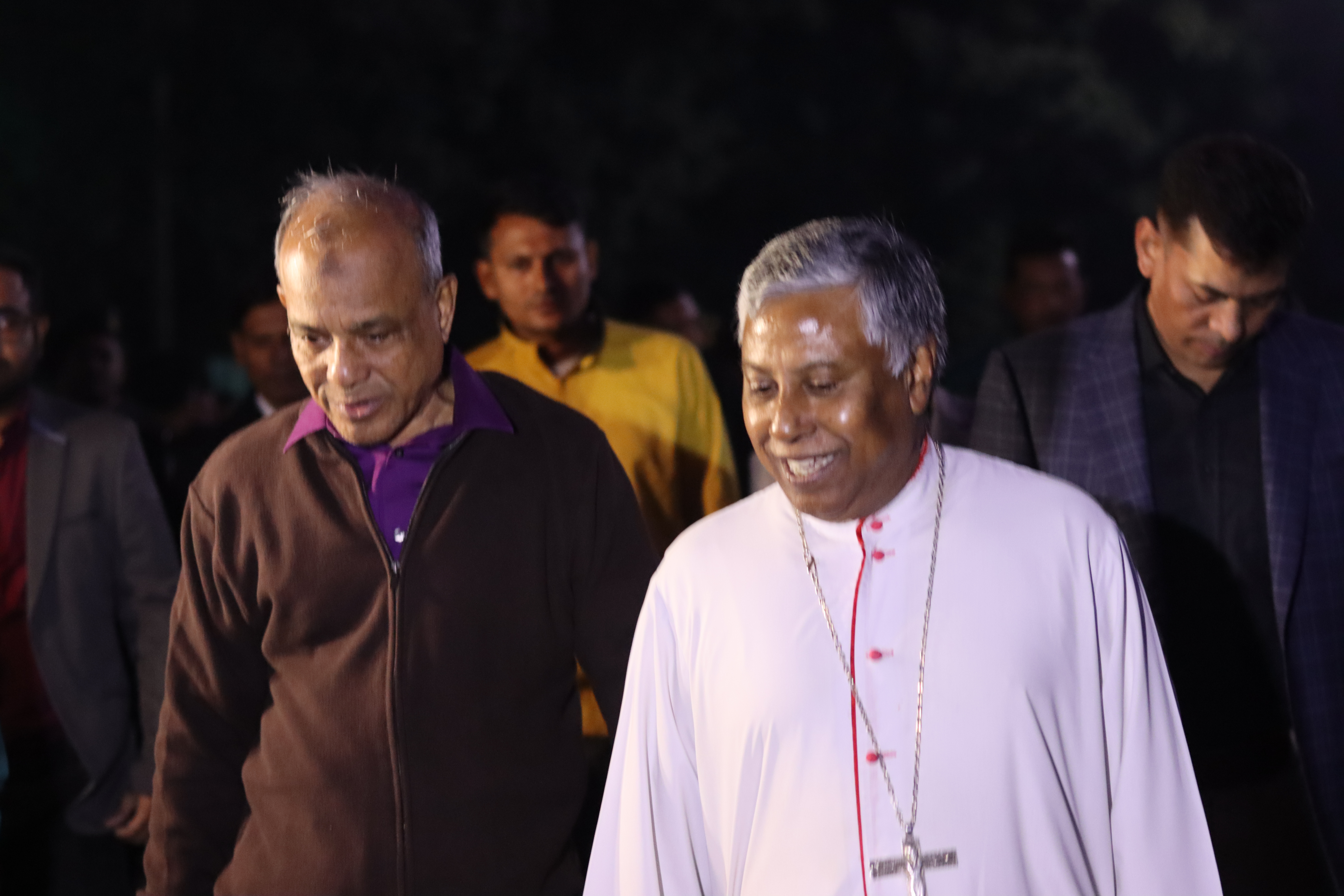
- D'Cruze (right in white) with Advisor for Home Affairs Jahangir Alam Chowdhury during 2024 Christmas celebration
- Church: Roman Catholic Church
- Archdiocese: Dhaka
- See: Dhaka
- Appointed: 30 September 2020
- Installed: 27 November 2020
- Predecessor: Patrick D'Rozario
- Other post: President of the Bangladeshi Episcopal Conference (2020-)
- Previous posts: Bishop of Khulna (2005-11); Bishop of Sylhet (2011-20)

Orders
- Ordination: 20 February 1987
- Consecration: 6 May 2005 by Michael Atul D'Rozario

Personal details
- Born: Bejoy Nicephorus D'Cruze; 9 February 1956 (age 70) Tuital, Nawabganj, East Pakistan
- Education: Pontifical Gregorian University
- Coat of arms

Styles of Bejoy Nicephorus D'Cruze
- Reference style: His Grace The Most Revd. Msgr.
- Spoken style: Your Grace
- Religious style: Archbishop

Bejoy Nicephorus D'Cruze O.M.I. (born 9 February 1956) is a Bangladeshi prelate of the Catholic Church who has been archbishop of Dhaka since 2020. He is the highest ranking prelate & the current head of the Catholic Church in Bangladesh. Additionally, he helds the honorary president of United Forum of Churches Bangladesh. He held positions of responsibility in his order, the Missionary Oblates of Mary Immaculate, before serving as bishop of Khulna from 2005 to 2011 and bishop of Sylhet from 2011 to 2020.

== Early years ==
Bejoy Nicephorus D'Cruze was born on 9 February 1956 in the village of Tuital, in the sub-district of Chapai Nawabganj Sadar in northwestern Bangladesh. As a child he attended the local Holy Spirit Church, a non-denominational religious center with Christian origins. After completing his primary and secondary studies, he enrolled in the major seminary of Dhaka to study in philosophy and theology. On 1 November 1986, he took his solemn vows as a member of the Missionary Oblates of Mary Immaculate. He was ordained a priest on 20 February 1987.

For the next three years he was assistant pastor of the parishes of Lokhipur and Mugaipar in the Archdiocese of Dhaka. From 1990 to 1993 he studied at the Pontifical Gregorian University in Rome and obtained a licentiate in theology. On his return home he was rector of the Oblates' vocation center for three years. In 1996 he returned to the Gregorian and earned a degree in theology in 1999. He then resumed his post in Bangladesh for two years.

Beginning in 1999 he taught for many years at the major seminary of Dhaka. In 2001 he became superior of the Oblate's education for the priesthood and he was superior of the Oblates' delegation in Bangladesh from 2001 to 2005. He was also a member of the Caritas committee for Bangladesh.

== Bishop of Khulna ==
On 19 February 2005, Pope John Paul II appointed him the third bishop of Khulna in southwest Bangladesh. He received his episcopal consecration on 6 May in front of the cathedral of St. Joseph in Khulna from Michael Atul D'Rozario, Bishop emeritus Khulna, with co-consecrators Michael Rozario, Archbishop of Dhaka, and Archbishop Paul Tschang In-Nam, apostolic nuncio to Bangladesh. He said the diocese was well established, with 61 schools and four hospitals, but looked to the government for protection from Islamic extremists. The fact that the Catholics of the diocese were ethnic Bengalis removed one possible source of friction, and relations between religious group were respectful.

He participated in the 2008 Synod of Bishops on the Word of God in the Life and Mission of the Church. He described the challenges of poverty and government corruption in Bangladesh and said that "the church has to live its solidarity with the poor".

== Bishop of Sylhet ==
On 8 July 2011, Pope Benedict XVI erected the Diocese of Sylhet on territory taken from the Archdiocese of Dhaka and appointed him its first bishop. He took possession of the diocese in the Pro-Cathedral of Lokhipur, 100 km from Sylhet, on 30 September. He later recalled his early years in Sylhet: "I didn't even have my own home. I rented a room in a house that belonged to Muslims and was not allowed to celebrate the Eucharist there. I could only say my personal prayers there. But in fact I still celebrated Mass there in secret, sometimes in the company of my brother priests." He visited his congregations by bus while the church had no building of its own. He planned a church building for multiple uses and planned to make it available to other Christian denominations. There had been little opposition to its construction. He said Islamic fundamentalism played a small role in the region, though converting Muslims was prohibited and Christians, just one percent of the population, suffered from discrimination. He had once received a death threat without consequences.

He also focused on defending the rights of the Khasi, the tribal people who make up most of the Catholic population. As a minority in many ways, they face discrimination and victimization by large commercial interests that destroy villages as they expand tea plantations without regard for the indigenous people's ancestral lands.

He was treasurer of the Catholic Bishops' Conference of Bangladesh (CBCB) for several years before being elected its general secretary on 15 August 2020. He was also president of its Commission for Christian Unity and Interreligious Dialogue.

== Archbishop of Dhaka ==
On 30 September 2020, Pope Francis appointed him archbishop of Dhaka. He was the first Oblate named to the position. He took possession of the archdiocese in the cathedral of Santa Maria in Dhaka on 27 November. He said he would implement the longterm plan developed for the archdiocese by his predecessor, emphasizing the evangelization of families to energize the laity; developing close relationships with other religious groups; and care for the multitude of internal migrants arriving and struggling in Dhaka.

In December 2020 he was elected president of the CBCB (Catholic Bishops Conference of Bangladesh).
