= The Portuguese in Dhaka =

The Portuguese were the first Europeans to arrive in Bengal as well as in Dhaka. The Portuguese who came to Dhaka were mostly missionaries and merchants came from their main base in Hugli.

== History ==
In sixteenth century, some Portuguese traders settled in Dhaka and they used to export Muslin, cotton and silk goods to Europe and Southeast Asia. According to Campos, the writer of Portuguese in Bengal (1919), the Portuguese settled in Dhaka in 1580. From some documents, it can be found that the Portuguese settlement was doing good in Dhaka till the early eighteenth century. Portuguese Augustine Fathers set up churches in Dhaka in this period. A church in Tejgaon is said to have been built by St. Augustine Missionaries prior to 1599.

The Portuguese bought two villages in Bhowal, and bought a piece of land in present-day Narinda. They built a church in Narinda in the site of the present day Christian cemetery, Dhaka in the early seventeenth century. In 1616, they officially settled a mission in Dhaka.

In 1632, Mughal emperor Shahjahan started to drive out the Portuguese from Bangal. The church in Narinda was abandoned during this time but was not damaged. Later Shaista Khan allowed the Portuguese to make a settlement on the bank of Ichamati River (about 25 kilometres (16 mi) south of Dhaka) as the Portuguese showed loyalty to the Mughals. The place where they made settlement located in present-day Muktarpur–Mirkadim area of Munshiganj is still known as "Firingibazaar". Narinda church is thought to be functioning again at this time as Father Anthony Barbier mentioned to spend Christmas at the church in his visit to Dhaka in 1713.

From documents of 1789 it can be seen that the only church active at that time is the one in Tejgaon (current Holy Rosary Church, Dhaka) which was a village four miles north of Dhaka's centre at that time. It is thought that the church of Narinda has been abandoned by this time. But from the map of Major James Rennell (1780), the Portuguese still had settlement around the area of the old church which is the current Narinda-Laxmibazar area. They also had a factory in that area.

From 1620, other European merchants started to receive trade permit from the Mughals. So, a competition between the Portuguese and other European traders started from this time. But they continued their business in Dhaka till the 18th century.

In the 18th century they started to lose their business in competition with Dutch and English merchants and had to shut down their business in Dhaka by the end of the century. It is thought that some missionaries still continued to be in Dhaka as another church was established in Dhaka district in 1815.

== See also ==
- History of Bengal
- History of Dhaka
