= St. Mary's Cathedral, Dhaka =

Coordinates: 23.7371°N 90.4051°E

St. Mary’s Cathedral
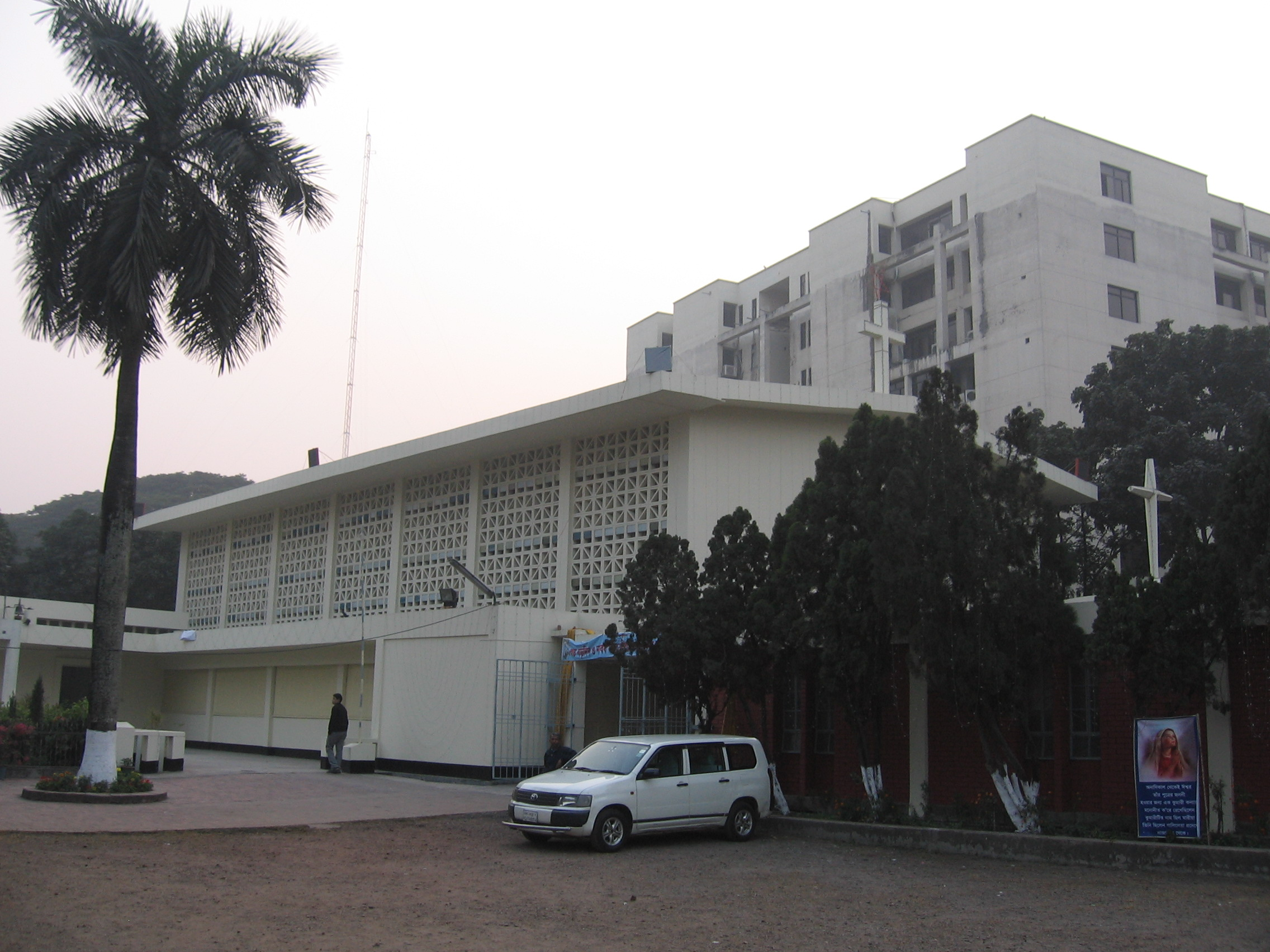
- St. Mary’s Cathedral
- Location: Dhaka
- Country: Bangladesh
- Denomination: Roman Catholic Church

St. Mary's Cathedral also called Cathedral of the Immaculate Conception is a religious building belonging to the Catholic Church and located in the Kakrail, Ramna, in Dhaka, Bangladesh. It was established in 1956 and his feast is celebrated on December 8.

It belongs to the Roman or Latin rite and is home to the Metropolitan Archdiocese of Dhaka (Latin: Archidioecesis Dhakensis; Bengali: ঢাকার বিশপের এলাকা). It is one of two cathedrals located in the city, the other is St. Thomas Anglican Cathedral. Its Metropolitan Archbishop is Patrick D'Rozario. It is dedicated to the Virgin Mary in her title of the Immaculate Conception.

== See also ==
- Roman Catholicism in Bangladesh
