= Michael Atul D'Rozario =

The Most Reverend Michael Atul D’Rozario C.S.C.
- Bishop; Bishop Emeritus of Khulna
- Church: Roman Catholic Church
- Diocese: Roman Catholic Diocese of Khulna
- See: Khulna (emeritus)
- Installed: 19 February 2005
- Term ended: 24 February 2016
- Other post: Bishop of Khulna.^{(1970-2005)}

Orders
- Ordination: 10 June 1953
- Consecration: 13 December 1970 by Theotonius Amal Ganguly
- Rank: Bishop

Personal details
- Born: Michael Atul D’Rozario; 23 November 1925 Noyansree
- Died: 24 February 2016 (aged 90) Dhaka, Bangladesh
- Denomination: Roman Catholic
- Residence: Dhaka, Bangladesh
- Motto: Do What Is Right

Styles of Michael Atul D’Rozario
- Reference style: The Most Reverend
- Spoken style: The Most Reverend
- Religious style: Bishop

Ordination history of Michael Atul D'Rozario
History
Episcopal consecration
- Principal consecrator: Theotonius Amal Ganguly
- Co-consecrators: Giuseppe (Josip) Uhac, Michael Rozario.
Episcopal succession
Bishops consecrated by Michael Atul D'Rozario as principal consecrator
- Bejoy Nicephorus D’Cruze: 6 May 2005

Michael Atul D'Rozario (11 November 1925 – 24 February 2016) was a Roman Catholic bishop. Ordained to the priesthood on 6 June 1953, D'Rozario was consecrated bishop for the Diocese of Khulna, Bangladesh (at the time in East Pakistan) on 13 December 1970, serving until 2005.

== Notes ==
Catholic Church titles
Preceded by Bejoy Nicephorus D'Cruze	Bishop of Khulna; 1970–2005	Succeeded by Dante Battaglierin
