= St. Joseph's Cathedral, Khulna =

St. Joseph's Cathedral
- St. Joseph's Cathedral
- 22.8091°N 89.5672°E
- Location: Khulna
- Country: Bangladesh
- Denomination: Roman Catholic Church

The St. Joseph's Cathedral also called Khulna Cathedral is a religious building affiliated with the Catholic Church which is located in Babu Khan Road, in the city of Khulna, third-largest in the Asian country of Bangladesh.

The temple dating from 1956 follows the Roman or Latin Rite and is the mother or main church of the diocese of Khulna (Dioecesis Khulnensis; খুলনা এর বিশপের এলাকা) which was created as a diocese of Jessore in 1952 by the Bull "Cum sit usu" by the Pope Pius XII.

It is under the pastoral responsibility of the Bishop James Romen Boiragi. Nearby is a secondary that also was named in honour of St. Joseph.

== See also ==
- Roman Catholicism in Bangladesh
- St. Joseph's Cathedral (disambiguation)
