= Costante Maltoni =

Italian Catholic prelate (1915–1980)

His Excellency Monsignor Costante Maltoni
- Archbishop of Thugga and Apostolic Pro-Nuncio to Pakistan
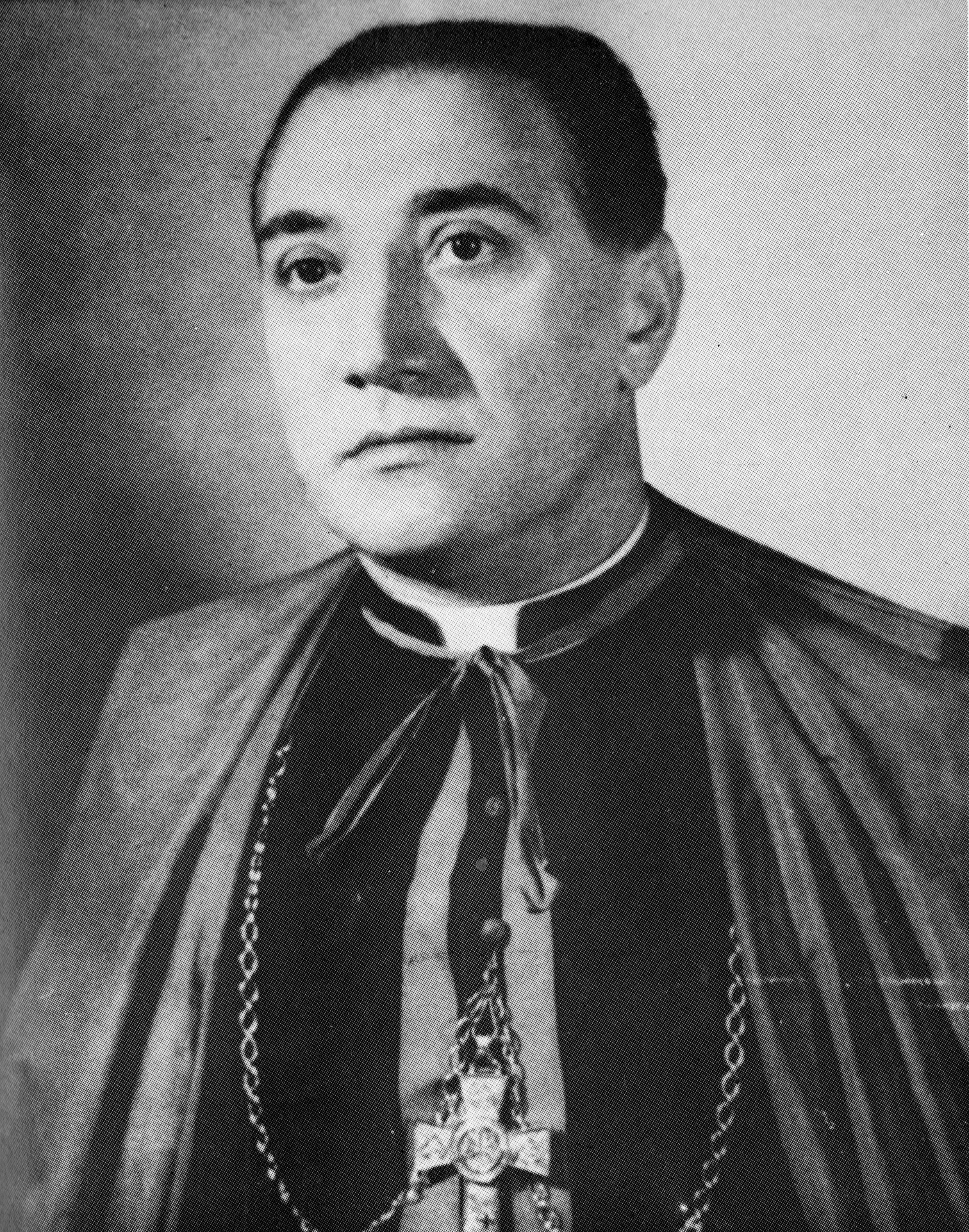
- Maltoni on his consecration day (1967)
- Church: Catholic Church
- In office: 1967–1980

Orders
- Ordination: 2 January 1967 by Pope Paul VI
- Consecration: 12 March 1967 by Amleto Cicognani
- Rank: Archbishop

Personal details
- Born: 14 February 1915 Forlimpopoli, Province of Forlì-Cesena, Italy
- Died: 1 February 1980 Rome
- Buried: Forlimpopoli's Monumental Cemetery
- Education: Pontifical Ecclesiastical Academy
- Motto: Portum Fidenter Capit
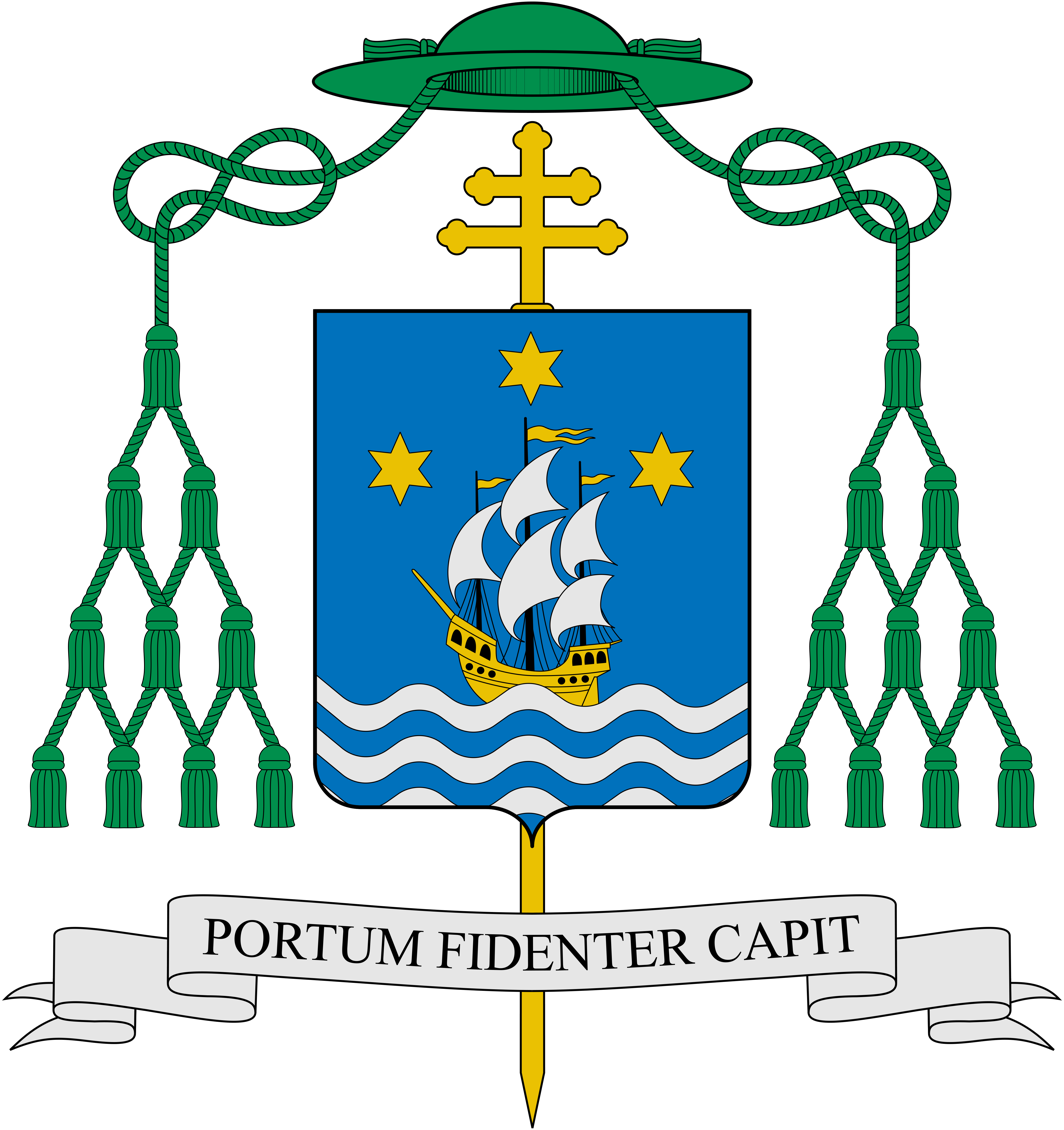
- Coat of arms

Styles of Costante Maltoni
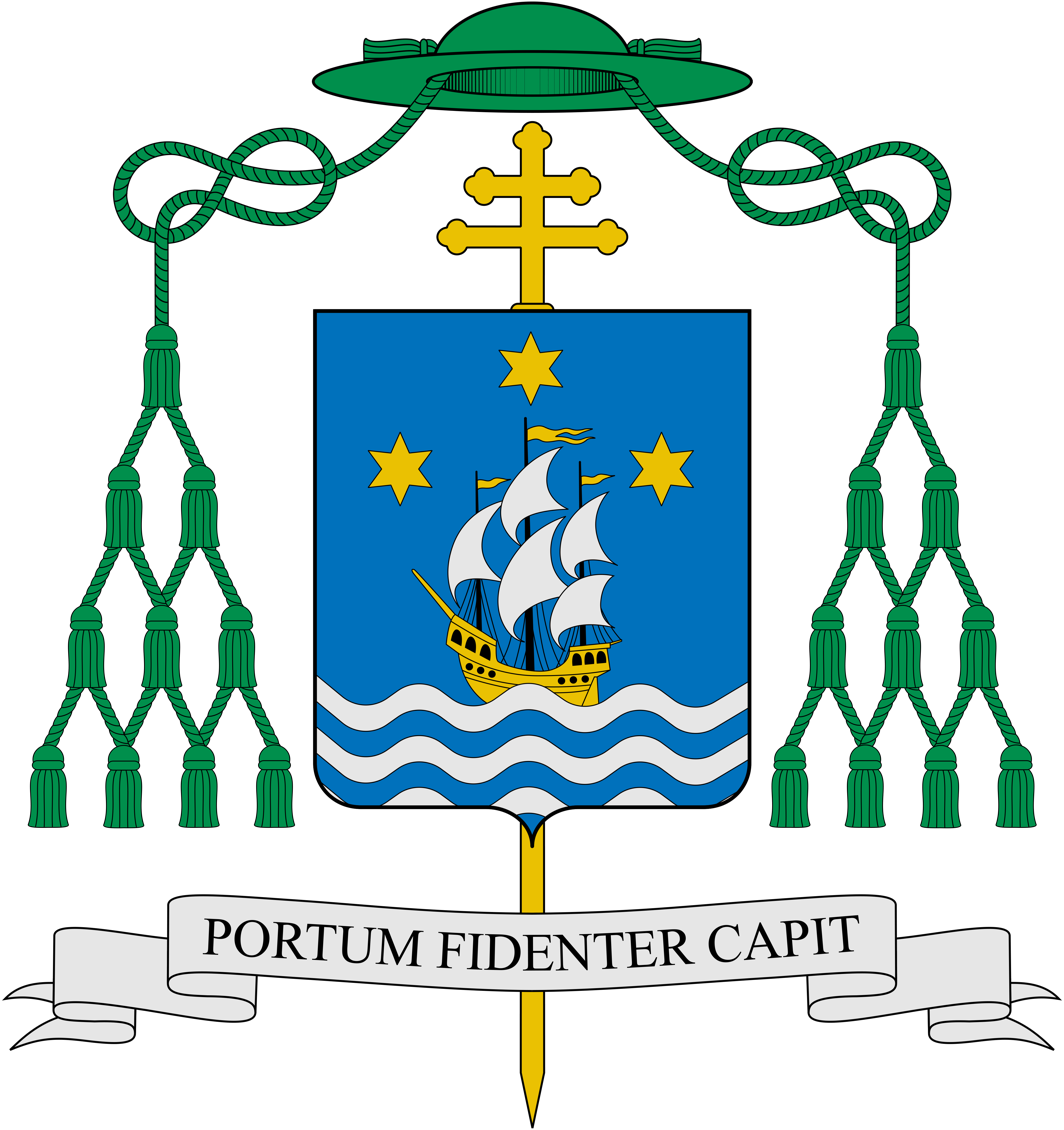
- Reference style: His Excellency Monsignor
- Spoken style: Your Excellency
- Religious style: Archbishop

Costante Maltoni (14 February 1915 – 1 February 1980) was an Italian prelate of the Catholic Church who worked in the diplomatic service of the Holy See.

== Biography ==
Costante Maltoni was born on 14 February 1915 in Forlimpopoli, in Italy. From an early age he was the author of popular prose passages, poems and essays, some of which were published in the magazine "Fiera letteraria". After completing his humanistic studies (gymnasium and classical high school) respectively in the seminaries of Bertinoro and Bologna, where he adds the four years in theology, Costante Maltoni was ordained a priest on June 26, 1938 in Forlimpopoli in the Church of S. Pietro.

Later he attended the Pontifical Lateran University and graduated in utruque iure in 1942.

=== Loyality to the anti-fascist resistance ===
In the meantime, he held various local positions, and during the passage of the war front in Forlimpopoli he was among the prominent exponents of the Resistance. Together with the Marquis Gianraniero Paulucci and Silvio Corbari, in his home in Via Monte Grappa in Forlimpopoli he elaborates the insurrectionary communiqué to the Italians entitled "Movimento Patriottico Giovane Italia", of which the family still retains the original document. Citizen and provincial member of the Liberation Committee, he works at the same time to activate sections of the nascent Democrazia Cristiana. In 1946 he attended the Pontifical Ecclesiastical Academy in Rome and in 1948 he was appointed clerk of the nunciature and used in the Vatican Secretariat of State.

=== Delegate of the Holy See at the High Commissioner for Refugees O.N.U ===
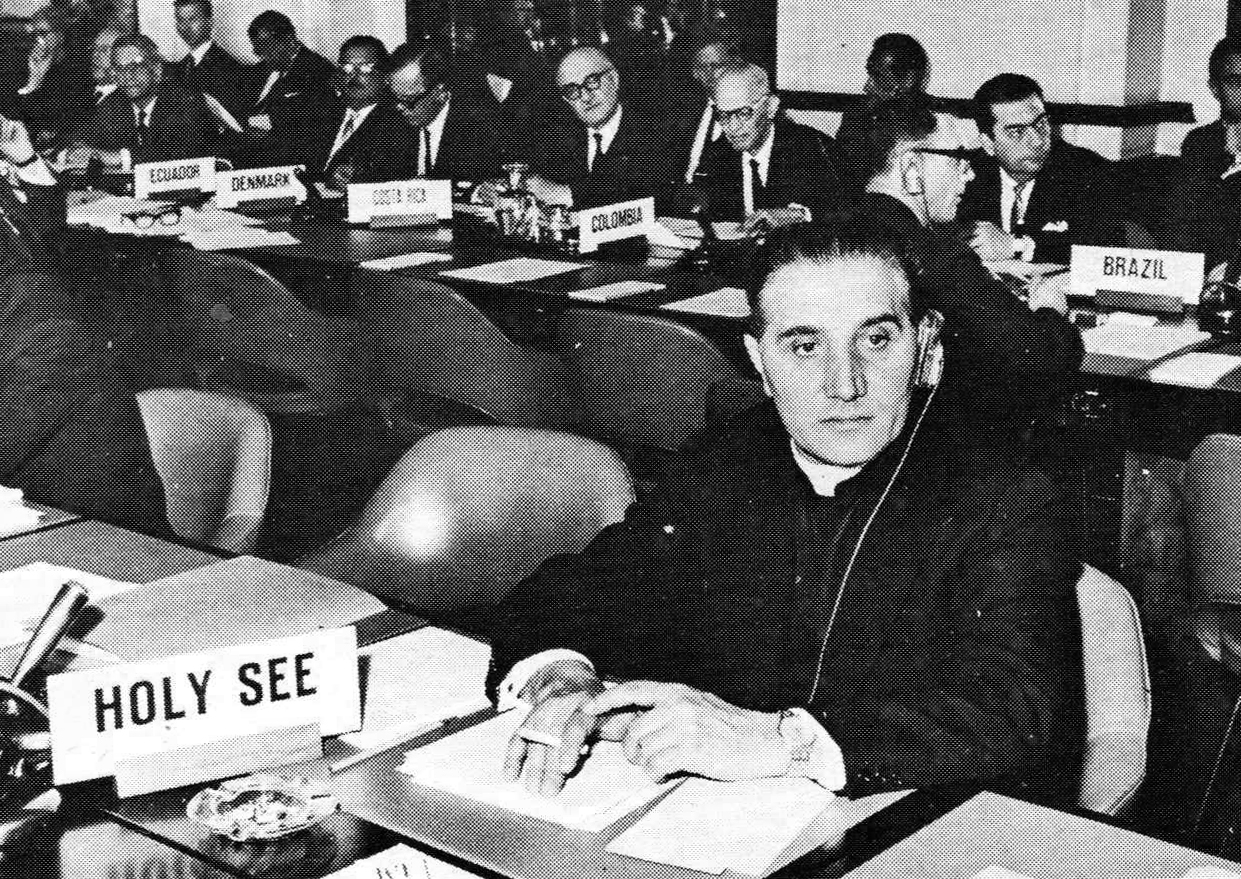
1958 - Geneva Mons. Costante Maltoni then became a delegate of the Holy See at the High Commissioner for Refugees O.N.U.

There followed assignments in the nunciatures of the Philippine Islands (1950), Turkey (1953), India (1956), Saigon, Vietnam (1958) and Bern, Switzerland (1960). He was nominated as Councilor of the Nunciature and directed relations between the Vatican and international organizations in Geneva (1961), then became a delegate of the Holy See at the High Commissioner for Refugees O.N.U. (C.I.M.E., A.S.C.S.D.C., B.I.T.).

=== Episcopal consecration and Apostolic Nunciature ===
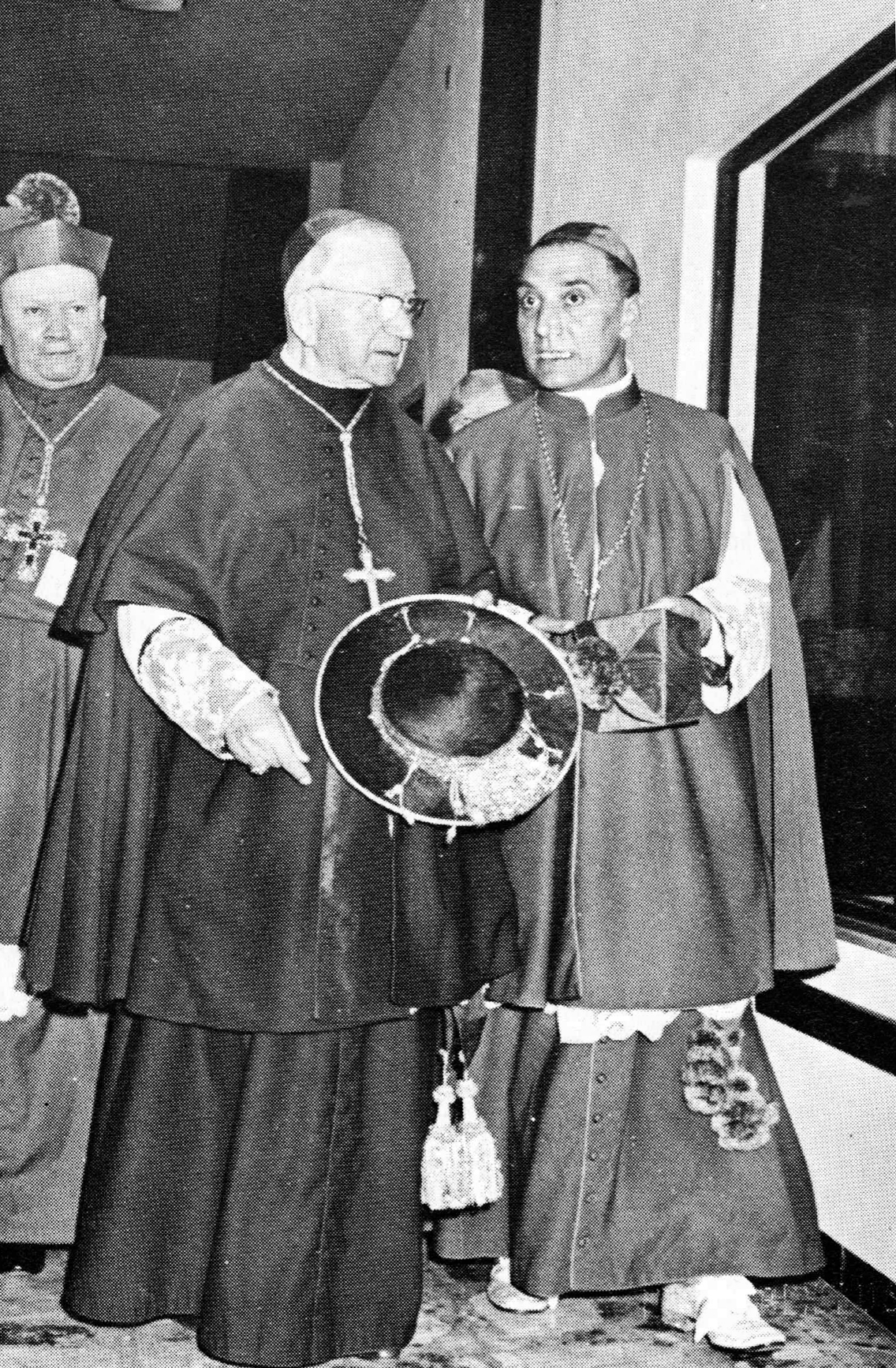
Forlimpopoli: episcopal consecration Mons. Costante Maltoni (right), with Cardinal Amleto Cocognani (center) and the bishop Giuseppe Bonaccini (left).

On 2 January 1967, Pope Paul VI named him titular archbishop of Thugga and Apostolic Pro-Nuncio to Pakistan. and the same year he received his episcopal consecration on 12 March 1967 from Cardinal Amleto Cicognani.

=== The return to Italy and Death ===
He returned to Italy (1970) for serious health reasons and remained there until his death in Rome (1980) which occurred due to a cardio-circulatory collapse with positions of Vatican Secretariat of State. He rests in the family tomb located in the monumental cemetery of Forlimpopoli

=== Things named in Maltoni's honor ===
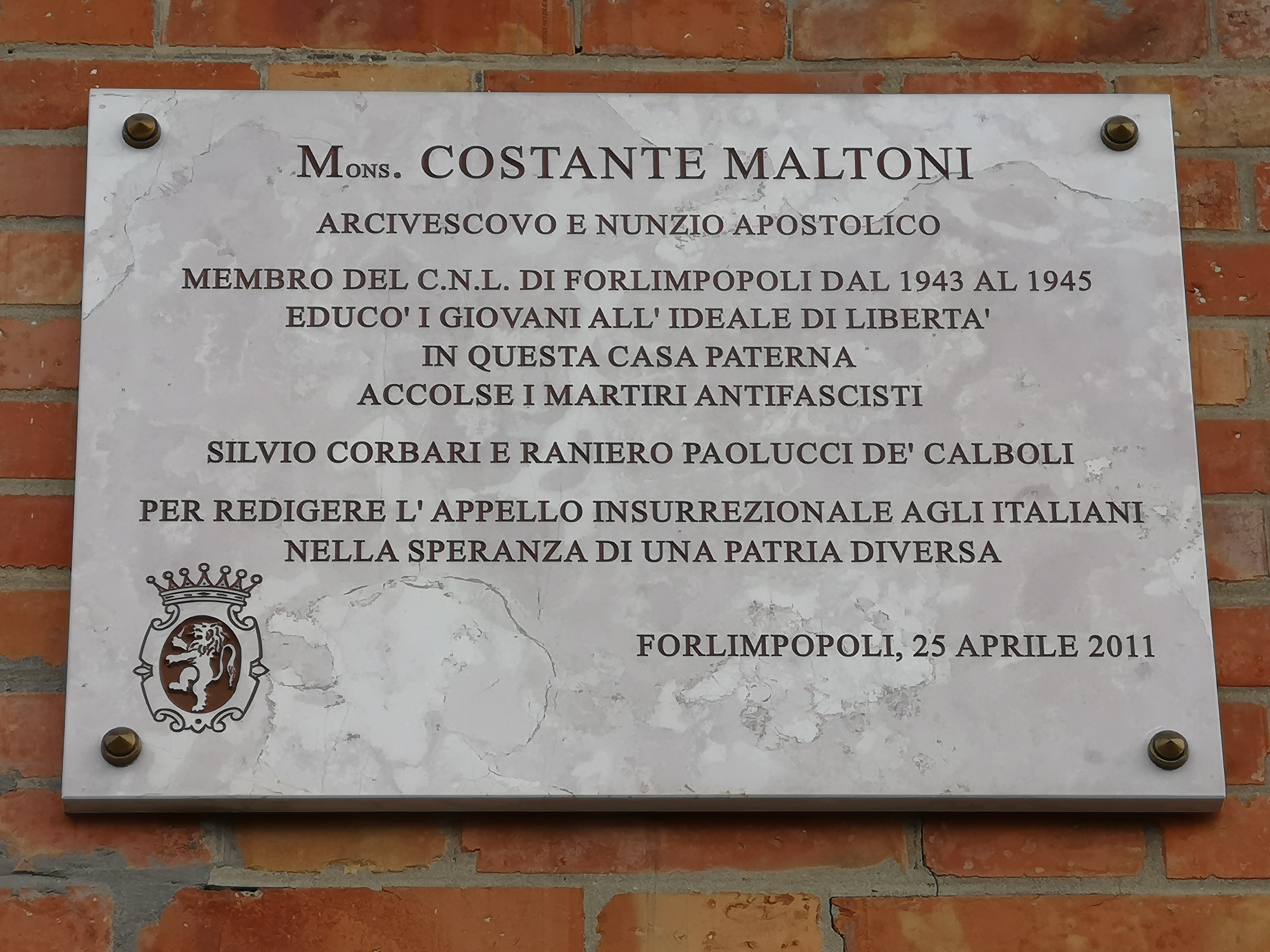
Forlimpopoli: plate in memory of Mons. Costante Maltoni in Via Monte Grappa 8

- On 25 April 2011 a commemorative plate was affixed by the municipality of Forlimpopoli to the birthplace of Costante Maltoni. The house is the same in which the anti-fascist resistance was organized and where the insurrectionary communiqué to the Italians entitled "Movimento Patriottico Giovane Italia" was written.
- The street with the same name in Forlimpopoli in the province of Forlì Cesena was named after Costante Maltoni.

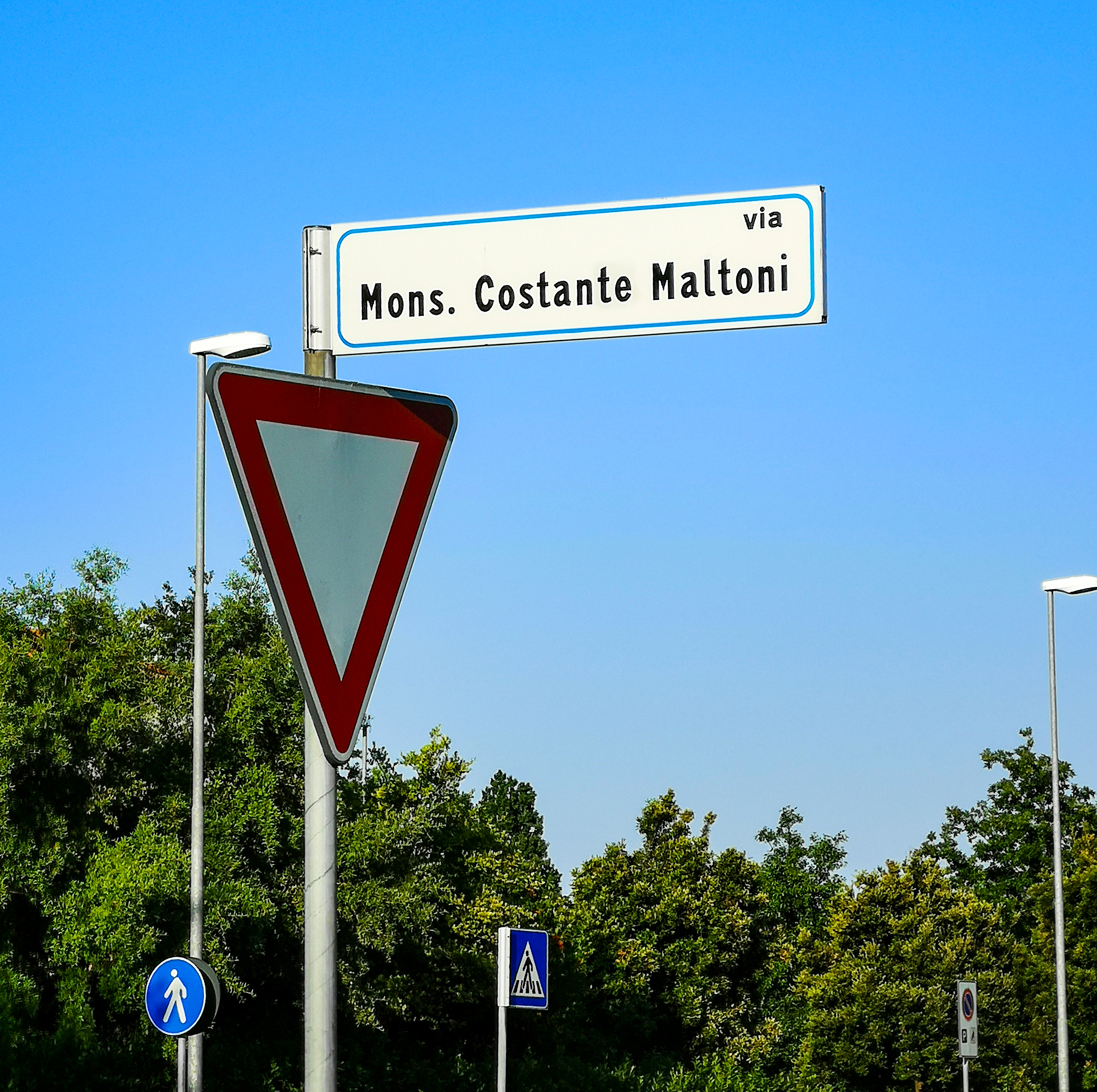
The plaque on the street of Forlimpopoli named after Mons. Costante Maltoni.
