= Paulinus Costa =

The Most Revd. Paulinus Costa
- Former Archbishop of Dhaka
- Appointed: 9 July 2005
- Predecessor: Michael Rosario
- Successor: Patrick D'Rozario
- Previous post: Bishop of Rajshahi

Orders
- Ordination: 21 December 1963 by Grégoire-Pierre Agagianian
- Consecration: 26 April 1996 by Adriano Bernardini

Personal details
- Born: 19 October 1936 Gazipur, Bengal Presidency, British India
- Died: 3 January 2015 (aged 78) Dhaka, Bangladesh
- Denomination: Catholicism

Paulinus Costa (19 October 1936 – 3 January 2015) was the Roman Catholic Archbishop of the archdiocese of Dhaka from 2005 to 2012.

== Career ==
Costa was born in Gazipur, Bangladesh. He was ordained as a priest on 21 December 1963. He was appointed the Bishop of Rajshahi on 11 January 1996, and was ordained on 26 April the same year.

On 9 July 2005 he was appointed the Archbishop of the Archdiocese of Dhaka by Pope Benedict XVI, replacing the deceased archbishop Michael Rosario.

In his official capacity, Costa worked to foster communal harmony in the Muslim-dominated country of Bangladesh. In recognition of his services, Costa was one of eight to receive an award from the Human Rights Legal Aid Society of Bangladesh for "significant contributions in defending human rights in Bangladesh".

Archbishop Costa retired on 22 October 2012 and was succeeded by Patrick D'Rozario.

== Personal life ==
Costa studied theology at the Pontifical Urbaniana University in Rome and obtained a PhD in theology in 1981.

== Death ==
He died on 3 January 2015 in Dhaka of a heart attack.

== See also ==
- Christianity in Bangladesh
- Roman Catholicism in Bangladesh
- Archdiocese of Dhaka

Catholic Church titles
Preceded by Michael Rosario	Archbishop of Dhaka; 2005–2012	Succeeded by Patrick D'Rozario
Preceded by Patrick D'Rozario	Bishop of Rajshahi; 1996–2004	Vacant Title next held by Gervas Rozario
