= Michael Rozario =

- Archbishop of Dhaka
- Church: Catholic Church
- Archdiocese: Archdiocese of Dhaka
- In office: 17 December 1977 – 9 July 2005
- Predecessor: Theotonius Amal Ganguly
- Successor: Paulinus Costa
- Previous post: Bishop of Dinjapur (1968-1977)

Orders
- Ordination: 22 December 1956
- Consecration: 8 December 1968 by Costante Maltoni

Personal details
- Born: 18 January 1926 Solepur (in present-day Sirajdikhan Upazila), Presidency of Fort William in Bengal, British Raj, British Empire
- Died: 18 March 2007 (aged 81) Dhaka, Bangladesh

Michael Rozario (18 January 1926 – 18 March 2007) was a Bangladeshi prelate of the Catholic Church who served as archbishop of Dhaka from 1977 to 2005. He was bishop of Dinajpur from 1968 to 1977.

== Biography ==
Michael Rozario was born in Solepur, Bengal Presidency, British India on 18 January 1926.

He was ordained a priest on 22 December 1956.

On 5 September 1968, Pope Paul VI named him bishop of Dinajpur.

He received his episcopal consecration in Dinajpur on 8 December from Archbishop Costante Maltoni, apostolic pro-nuncio to Pakistan.

From 1978 to 2005 he was president of the Catholic Bishops' Conference of Bangladesh.

In 1985 he attended the meeting of 165 bishops assembled in Rome by Pope John Paul II to assess the reception of the Second Vatican Council after twenty years. He underlined the Council's call for understanding of other religions. He said that in interreligious dialogue "We discover that, like us, they desire to give the realistic and creative alternative of faith to materialistic currents."

Pope Benedict XVI accepted his resignation on 9 July 2005.

He died in Apollo Hospital in Dhaka on 18 March 2007.
