= Gervas Rozario =

The Most Reverend Gervas Rozario
- Bishop of Rajshahi
- Predecessor: Patrick D'Rozario
- Other posts: Chairman of Catholic Bishops’ Episcopal Commission for Social Communications and Episcopal Commission Justice and Peace

Personal details
- Born: 15 August 1951 (age 74) Satiangasa, Natore
- Denomination: Catholicism

Gervas Rozario (born 15 August 1951) is bishop of the Roman Catholic diocese of Rajshahi. His diocese has 59,630 Catholics.

== Biography ==
Gervas Rozario was born on 15 August 1951 in Satiangasa village in Natore District. He studied his primary education in St. Joseph Higher Secondary School. He passed SSC from St. Philip's High School, Dinajpur in 1970. He completed his HSC in Notre Dame College, Dhaka in 1973. He completed his B.A from Notre Dame College, Dhaka in 1975. He also finished philosophy and theology from the National Major Seminary in Dhaka.

He was ordained a priest on 31 December 1980, and served in several Rajshahi parishes. He was rector in the minor seminaries in the Dinajpur and Dhaka dioceses, and vice rector at the National Major Seminary in Dhaka. He also taught at the University of Dhaka in the Department of World Religions.

In 1991, he completed a doctorate on moral theology in Rome.

Rozario was appointed Bishop of Rajshahi on 15 January 2007. His ordination as the Bishop of Rajshahi took place on 22 March 2007. Bishop Rozario is now chairman of Catholic Bishops’ Episcopal Commission for Social Communications and Episcopal Commission Justice and Peace.

He is vice-president of The Catholic Bishops' Conference of Bangladesh, founded in 1971, that is the General Body of the Bishops of Bangladesh. The purpose of this Conference is to facilitate common policy and action in matters that affect or are liable to affect the interest of the Catholic Church in Bangladesh and to be of service to the country at large. He is also general body member of Caritas Bangladesh and member of board of trustees of Notre Dame University Bangladesh.
