= Pierre Dufal =

French-born bishop

Most Reverend Pierre Dufal, C.S.C.
- Coadjutor Bishop of Galveston
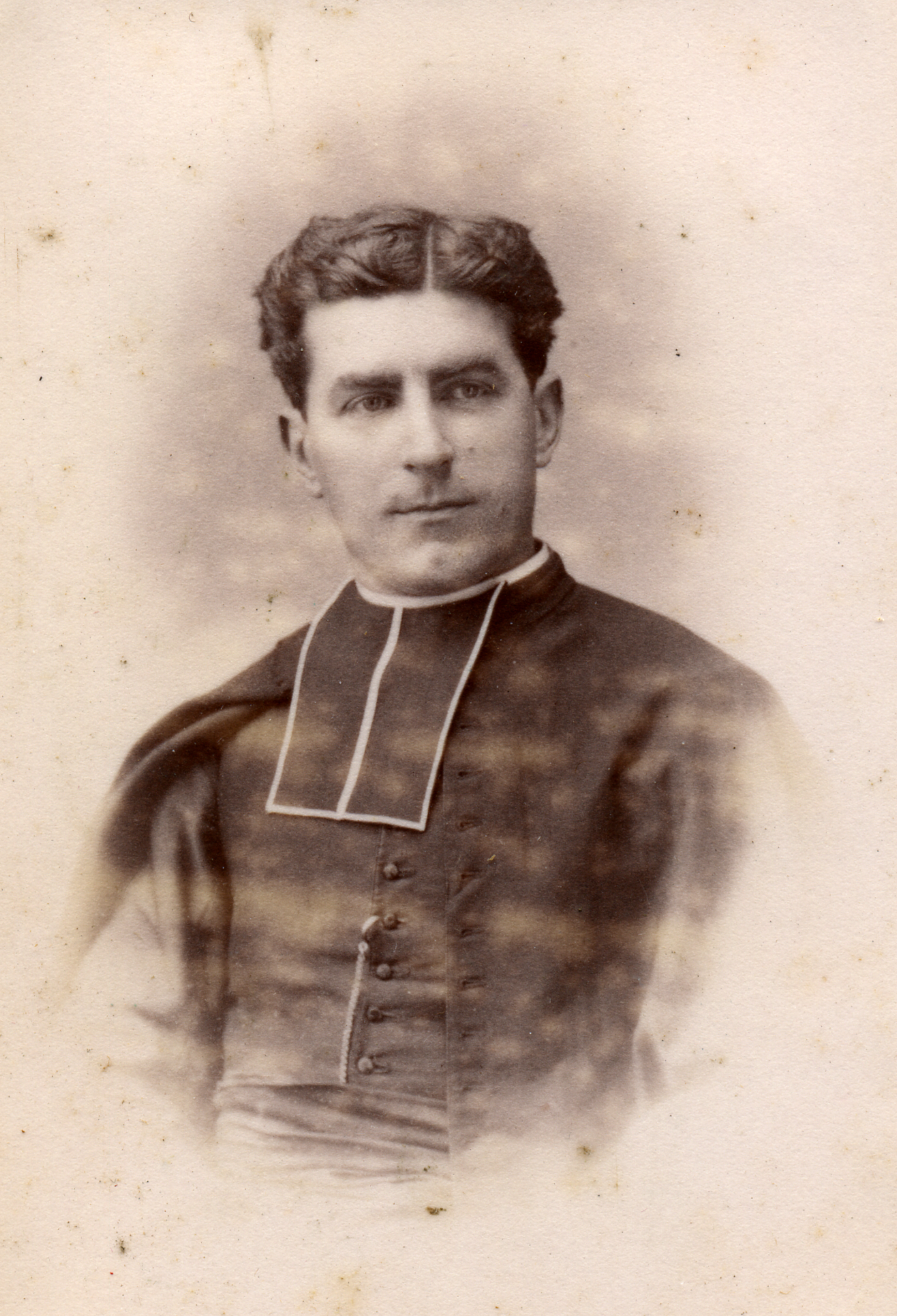
- Church: Catholic Church
- See: Titular See of Delcus
- Appointed: 14 May 1878
- Term ended: 6 December 1879
- Previous posts: Vicar Apostolic of Eastern Bengal (1860-1876); Superior General of the Congregation of Holy Cross (1866-1868)

Orders
- Ordination: 29 September 1852
- Consecration: 25 November 1860 by Joseph-Hippolyte Guibert
- Rank

2nd Superior General of the Congregation of Holy Cross
- In office 1866–1868
- Preceded by: Basil Moreau
- Succeeded by: Edward Sorin

Personal details
- Born: 8 November 1822 Saint-Gervais-d'Auvergne, Puy-de-Dôme, France
- Died: 14 March 1898 (aged 75) Neuilly-sur-Seine, France

Pierre Dufal, C.S.C. (8 November 1822 – 14 March 1898) was a French-born bishop of the Catholic Church in Eastern Bengal and the United States. He served as the vicar apostolic of Eastern Bengal and as the coadjutor bishop of Galveston. He was also the superior general of the Congregation of Holy Cross.

== Biography ==
Born in the village of Saint-Gervais-d'Auvergne, Puy-de-Dôme, France, Pierre Dufal professed final vows in the Congregation of Holy Cross on 20 January 1852 and ordained a priest on 29 September that year. On 3 July 1860 Pope Pius IX appointed him as the Titular Bishop of Delcus and Vicar Apostolic of Eastern Bengal. He was consecrated a bishop by Archbishop Joseph-Hippolyte Guibert of Paris on 25 November 1860.

The principal co-consecrators were Bishops Jean-Jacques Nanquette of Le Mans and Célestine Guynemer de la Hailandière of Vincennes, Indiana.

Dufal was assigned as the superior general of Congregation of Holy Cross on 25 August 1866 and resigned the position two years later on 19 July. He participated in the First Vatican Council (1869–1870) as one of the council fathers. His resignation as the vicar apostolic of Eastern Bengal was accepted by Pope Pius on 28 July 1876. Pope Leo XIII assigned Dufal as the coadjutor bishop of Galveston on 14 May 1878. His resignation for reasons of health was accepted by Pope Leo on 6 December 1879.

Dufal retired to the house of his congregation at Neuilly-sur-Seine, near Paris, where he died on 14 March 1898 at the age of 75.
