= Diocese of Khulna =

Roman Catholic diocese in Bangladesh

Coordinates: 22.8091°N 89.5672°E

Diocese of Khulna Diœcesis Khulnensis খুলনা ধর্মপ্রদেশ

Location
- Country: Bangladesh
- Ecclesiastical province: Chittagong
- Metropolitan: Chittagong

Statistics
- Area: 25,855 km^{2} (9,983 sq mi)
- Population: Total; Catholics: (as of 2013); 14,717,000; 35,152 (0.2%)

Information
- Denomination: Roman Catholic
- Rite: Latin Rite
- Established: 3 January 1952 (as Diocese of Jessore); 14 June 1956 (as Diocese of Khulna)
- Cathedral: St Joseph's Cathedral in Khulna
- Patron saint: Assumption of Mary

Current leadership
- Pope: Leo XIV
- Bishop: James Romen Boiragi
- Metropolitan Archbishop: Moses Costa, C.S.C.

The Roman Catholic Diocese of Khulna (Latin: Diœcesis Khulnensis) is a Latin suffragan diocese in the ecclesiastical province of Chittagong, one of two provinces in Bangladesh. However it remains dependent on the missionary Roman Congregation for the Evangelization of Peoples.

Its cathedral episcopal see is St. Joseph's Cathedral, in the city of Khulna, Khulna Division. Bishop James Roman Boiragi, who was a local priest, now he leads the diocese. Many Italian priests, including local priests and nuns, are preaching the word of God in the diocese and taking spiritual care to the parishioners.

== Statistics ==
As per 2015, it pastorally served 35,352 Catholics (0.2% of 16,396,000 total) on 28,236 km^{2} in 11 parishes with 42 priests (26 diocesan, 16 religious), 118 lay religious (21 brothers, 97 sisters) and 7 seminarians. It has Religious Societies 13, High School 5, Primary School 17, Seminary & Novitiate 8, Boarding House & Orphanages 17, Health Center/Clinic 9.

== History ==
The bishopric was created on 3 January 1952 as the Diocese of Jessore, as a suffragan of the Metropolitan Archdiocese of Calcutta in India. In this region the Foreign Missionaries of Milan (P.I.M.E.) had begun their apostolate in 1855. Actually in 1856, Fr. Antonio Marietti, PIME, arrived in Jessore. From 1927 to 1952, the Salesian Missionaries worked in this territory. However, Satkhira Parish was under the Jesuits from Calcutta during 1918–1952.

It was renamed on 14 June 1956 as Diocese of Khulna when its Episcopal see was transferred from Jessore to the larger city of Khulna. The bishopric was entrusted to the St. Francis Xavier Foreign Mission Society (S.X.), popularly known as the "Xaverian Fathers".

Since the elevation of the Diocese of Chittagong to Archbishopric in February 2017, Khulna became one of it two original suffragans.

Of special historical interest is Iswaripur, which is fifty miles south of Satkhira town. At this place was located the first ever Christian Church structure, dedicated by the Jesuits on 1 January 1600 under the title of "The Church of the Holy name of Jesus"; nothing of this Church remains now. There was no other Christian Church in the area comprising the present Khulna Diocese until the arrival of the PIME Missionaries in 1856. Then the first Church was at Jessore (1856).

== Episcopal ordinaries ==
Suffragan Bishops of Jessore
(incumbent?s unavailable)

Suffragan Bishops of Khulna

- Dante Battaglierin (Italian), S.X. (3 August 1956 – 20 March 1969), emeritate as Titular Bishop of Ploaghe (1969.03.20 – 1976.09.23), died 1978.
- Michael Atul D'Rozario, C.S.C. (21 September 1970 – resigned 19 February 2005), died 2016
- Bejoy Nicephorus D'Cruze, O.M.I. (19 February 2005 – 8 July 2011); next Bishop of Roman Catholic Diocese of Sylhet (2011.07.08 – ...)
- James Romen Boiragi (4 May 2012 – ...); formerly, Vicar General and Diocesan Administrator

== Special personalities ==
- Father Marino Rigor, Christian Missionary and writer and translator of some 40 books into Italian, whom Bangladeshi Government awarded Honorary citizenship.

== Sources and external links ==
- GCatholic.org
- Catholic Hierarchy
- http://www.cbcbsec.org/the_catholic_directory_4_bangladesh.tm
