= Lawrence Leo Graner =

The Most Reverend Lawrence Leo Graner C.S.C.
- Archbishop of Dacca
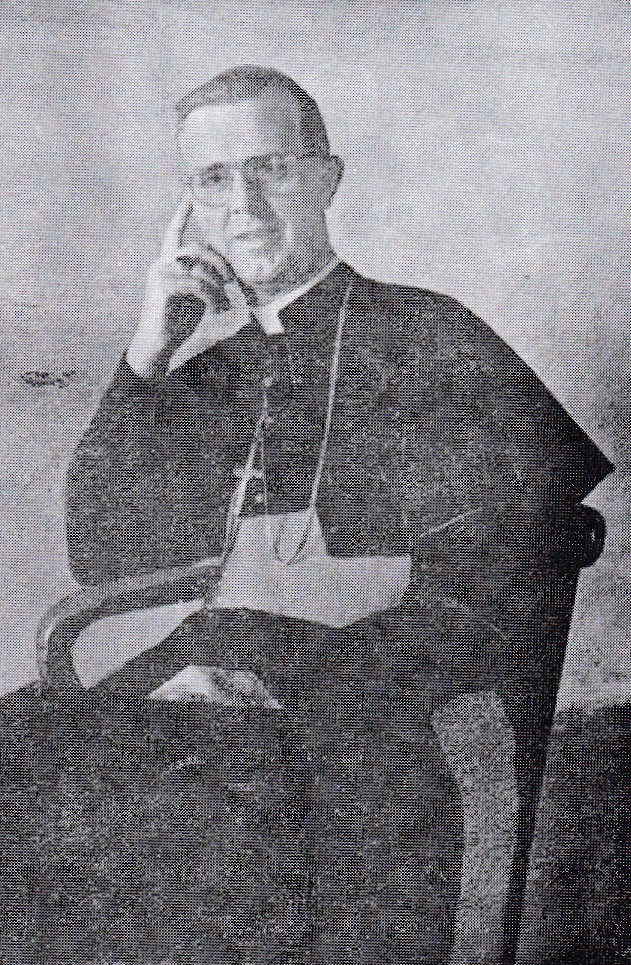
- Church: Roman Catholic Church
- Archdiocese: Roman Catholic Archdiocese of Dhaka
- Installed: July 15, 1950
- Term ended: November 23, 1967
- Successor: Theotonius Amal Ganguly
- Other posts: Bishop of Dacca, Bangladesh.^{(1947-1950)} Titular Archbishop of Vazari-Didda^{(1967-1971)}

Orders
- Ordination: June 24, 1928
- Consecration: April 23, 1947 by John Francis O’Hara
- Rank: Bishop

Personal details
- Born: Lawrence Leo Graner; April 3, 1901 Franklin, Venango County, Pennsylvania, United States
- Died: April 21, 1982 (aged 81) Notre Dame, South Bend, St. Joseph County, Indiana, United States
- Denomination: Roman Catholic
- Residence: Dhaka, Bangladesh
- Parents: William Bernard Groner^{(Father)}, Martha Emily Coxson^{(Mother)}

Styles of Lawrence Leo Graner
- Reference style: The Most Reverend
- Spoken style: The Most Reverend
- Religious style: Bishop

Ordination history of Lawrence Leo Graner
History
Episcopal consecration
- Principal consecrator: Bishop John Francis O’Hara, C.S.C., Bishop of Buffalo, New York
- Co-consecrators: Bishop John Mark Gannon, Bishop of Erie, Pennsylvania; Bishop John Francis Noll, Bishop of Fort Wayne, Indiana
Episcopal succession
Bishops consecrated by Lawrence Leo Graner as principal consecrator
- Bishop Raymond Larose, C.S.C.: 1952

Lawrence Leo Graner, CSC (April 3, 1901 – April 21, 1982) was Archbishop of the Archdiocese of Dhaka from July 15, 1950, to November 23, 1967. Archbishop Graner was a religious of the Congregation of Holy Cross.

== Biography ==
Graner was born on April 3, 1901, in Franklin, Venango County, in the U.S. state of Pennsylvania. He was the second son of William Bernard Groner and his wife Martha Emily Coxson.

In 1947, Graner was consecrated a bishop and appointed the Bishop of the Diocese of Dhaka. Three years later It was elevated to Metropolitan Archdiocese by Pope Pius XII and he became its archbishop. In November 1967, he resigned from the post and then he was appointed Titular Archbishop of Vazari-Didda.

He died on April 21, 1982, at Notre Dame in St. Joseph County, in the U.S. state of Indiana.

Catholic Church titles
| Preceded by Timothy Joseph Crowley | Bishop of Dhaka; 1947–1950 | Became Archbishop |
| New title | Archbishop of Dhaka; 1950–1967 | Succeeded by Theotonius Amal Ganguly |
