= Theotonius Amal Ganguly =

Archbishop of Archdiocese of Dhaka from 1967 until 1977

Servant of God Theotonius Amal Ganguly Ph.D., C.S.C.
- Archbishop of Dacca
- Church: Roman Catholic Church
- Archdiocese: Roman Catholic Archdiocese of Dhaka
- Installed: 23 November 1967
- Term ended: 2 September 1977
- Other posts: Auxiliary Bishop of Dacca, Bangladesh.^{(1960-1967)} Titular Bishop of Oliva^{(1960-1965)} Coadjutor Archbishop of Dacca, Bangladesh^{(1965-1967)} Titular Archbishop of Drizipara^{(1965-1967)} Apostolic Administrator of Khulna, Bangladesh^{(1969-1970)}
- Previous posts: President of the Pakistan Catholic Bishop's Conference^{(1971-1973)}, President of the Catholic Bishop's Conference of Bangladesh^{(1973-1977)}

Orders
- Ordination: 6 June 1946
- Consecration: 7 October 1960 by Gregorio Pietro Agagianian
- Rank: Bishop

Personal details
- Born: Theotonius Amal Ganguly; 18 February 1920 Hasnabad, East Bengal, British India
- Died: September 2, 1977 (aged 57) Dhaka, Bangladesh
- Denomination: Roman Catholic
- Residence: Dhaka, Bangladesh
- Parents: Nicholas Komol^{(Father)}, Romana Komola Ganguly^{(Mother)}
- Education: University of Notre Dame (Doctor of Philosophy)
- Motto: I Come To You With Joyful Heart

Styles of Theotonius Amal Ganguly
- Reference style: Servant of God
- Spoken style: Servant of God
- Religious style: Bishop

Ordination history of Theotonius Amal Ganguly
History
Episcopal consecration
- Principal consecrator: Grégoire-Pierre XV (François) Cardinal Agagianian
- Co-consecrators: Archbishop Lawrence Leo Graner, C.S.C., Archbishop Joseph Marie Anthony Cordeiro.
Episcopal succession
Bishops consecrated by Theotonius Amal Ganguly as principal consecrator
- Bishop Michael Atul D’Rozario, C.S.C.: December 13, 1970

Theotonious Amal Ganguly, CSC, (18 January 1920, in Hashnabad, Bangladesh – 2 September 1977) was Archbishop of the Archdiocese of Dhaka from 1967 until his death on 2 September 1977. Archbishop Ganguly was a religious of the Congregation of Holy Cross.

== Career ==
The local bishop sent him to the major seminary, called St. Albert's Seminary, run by the Jesuit Fathers at Ranchi of Bihar State, India. As usual, he was liked and appreciated by both the professors and seminarians for his studies and humble behaviour.

He successfully completed two years of philosophy and four years of theology studies at the seminary and, on 6 June 1946, was ordained a diocesan priest at St. Mary's Cathedral, Ranchi, by Jesuit Bishop Oscar Sevrin.

In 1947, newly consecrated Bishop Lawrence Leo Graner of the Diocese of Dhaka, sent Ganguly to the University of Notre Dame, Indiana, for higher studies in philosophy. He completed an M.A. in philosophy and then, in 1951, received his Ph.D. degree in philosophy with his doctoral dissertation on Purush and Prakriti (Self and Nature): A Philosophical Appraisal of Patanjali – Samkhya – Yoga. (Patañjali was an ancient Hindu philosopher promoting yoga for inner contemplation, born in India in about 250 B.C.)

While at Notre Dame, Ganguly expressed interest in joining the Congregation of Holy Cross. Sent to the novitiate in Jordan, Minnesota, in 1951, he made his religious profession on 16 August 1952 before returning to Dhaka in October of that year.

Appointed a professor of logic and English at Notre Dame College, founded by Holy Cross in Dhaka in 1949, he became the dean of studies in 1954, and, in 1958, he was appointed vice principal of the college. After James L. Martin died suddenly in 1960, Ganguly succeeded him as the principal.

In 1960, Ganguly was consecrated a bishop and Titular Bishop of Oliva as well as the Auxiliary Bishop of the Archdiocese of Dhaka. Five years later he was appointed Titular Archbishop of Drizipara and the Coadjutor Archbishop of Dhaka. In November 1967, he became the Metropolitan Archbishop of Dhaka.

He was also the President of Pakistan Catholic Bishops' Conference (PCBC,1971–1973) and President of the Catholic Bishops' Conference of Bangladesh (CBCB, 1973–1977).

== Death and canonization process ==
He died suddenly on 2 September 1977 of a heart attack.

Archbishop Ganguly's canonization process started in 2006. Archbishop Paulinus Costa of Dhaka, on 2 September of that year, in an official ceremony at St. Mary's Cathedral in Dhaka, introduced the causes and opened the diocesan inquiry on Archbishop Theotonius Amal Ganguly, CSC. The process of his canonization is at the first stage known as "Servant of God".

== See also ==
- Christianity in Bangladesh
- Roman Catholicism in Bangladesh
