= Diocese of Mymensingh =

Roman Catholic diocese in Bangladesh

Coordinates: 24.744330°N 90.415316°E

Diocese of Mymensingh Diœcesis Mymensinghensis ময়মনসিংহ ধর্মপ্রদেশ

Location
- Country: Bangladesh
- Metropolitan: Dhaka

Statistics
- Area: 16,448 km^{2} (6,351 sq mi)
- Population: Total; Catholics: (as of 2013); 14,011,991; 76,047 (0.5%)

Information
- Denomination: Roman Catholic
- Rite: Latin Rite
- Established: 15 May 1987
- Cathedral: St Patrick’s Cathedral in Mymensingh
- Patron saint: Saint Patrick

Current leadership
- Pope: Leo XIV
- Bishop: Paul Ponen Kubi, C.S.C.
- Metropolitan Archbishop: Patrick D'Rozario

Map
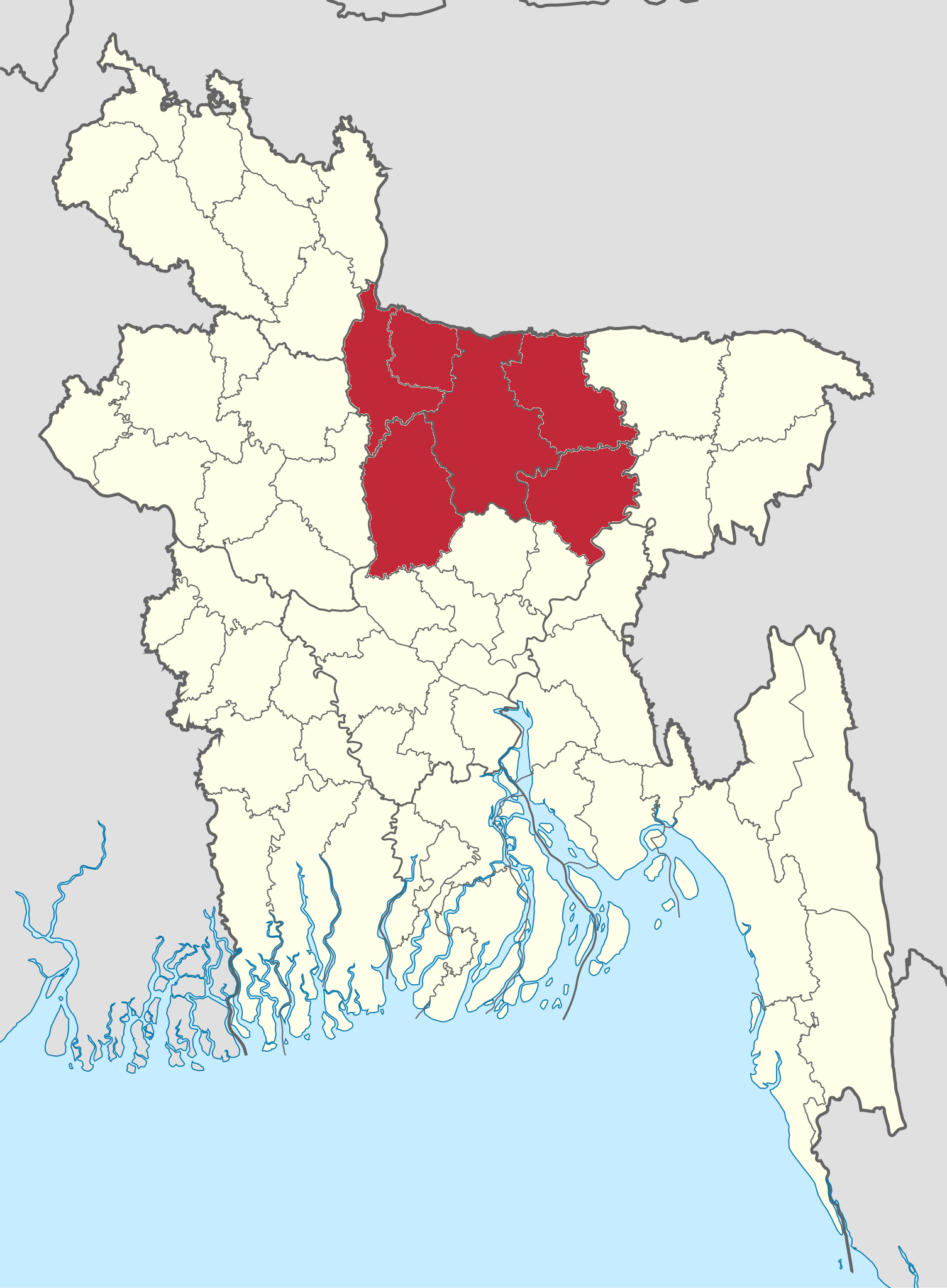

The Roman Catholic Diocese of Mymensingh (Latin: Diœcesis Mymensinghensis) is a diocese located in the city of Mymensingh in the ecclesiastical province of Dhaka in Bangladesh. Bishop Ponen Paul Kubi is head of the Diocese of Mymensingh. Most of the people in this Diocese are from Garo community. A total of 76,047 Catholics and 6665 Protestant Christians live here.

== History ==
Mymensingh Diocese was part of Dhaka Archdiocese before in 1987. It was created by Pope John Paul II. Bishop Francis A Gomes was the first bishop in the Diocese of Mymensingh.

In 1909, five Garo leaders made a long trip down to Dhaka to ask the Catholic Bishop, Peter Joseph Hurth, to send them a priest. A year later, Arch Bishop sent Fr. Fleury and Brother Eugene to study the situation.

In late 1910 and early 1911, Adolphe Francis began the work in Tausalpara near Ranikhong. On 19 March 1911, Francis reaped the first fruits with 21 Catholic baptisms at Tausalpara. The first church among the Garos was built at Tausalpara in 1912, and in 1913 Francis began living there. In 1915, he moved to the Ranikhong hill where Ranikhong Parish is now.

Until 1918, Francis was practically always alone, tramping the Garo country from east to west, covering the 90 miles strip of territory, where in the following twenty-five years a total of six parishes were established.

On Christmas Day 2003, Ponen Paul Kubi (at the time Director of the Pobitra Krush Sadhana Griha, Rampura, Dhaka) was appointed Auxiliary Bishop of Mymensingh and consecrated in Mymensingh on 13 February 2004. On 15 July 2006, Kubi was appointed Second Bishop of Mymensingh by Pope Benedict XVI. The Installation ceremony was held on September 1, 2006.

== Bishops ==
- Bishops of Mymensingh (Roman rite)
  - Bishop Francis Anthony Gomes (May 15, 1987 – July 15, 2006)
  - Bishop Paul Ponen Kubi (July 15, 2006 – present)

== Notable personalities ==
- Promode Mankin, State Minister for Ministry of Social Welfare
