= Catholic Church in Bangladesh =

- বাংলাদেশে ক্যাথলিক গির্জা
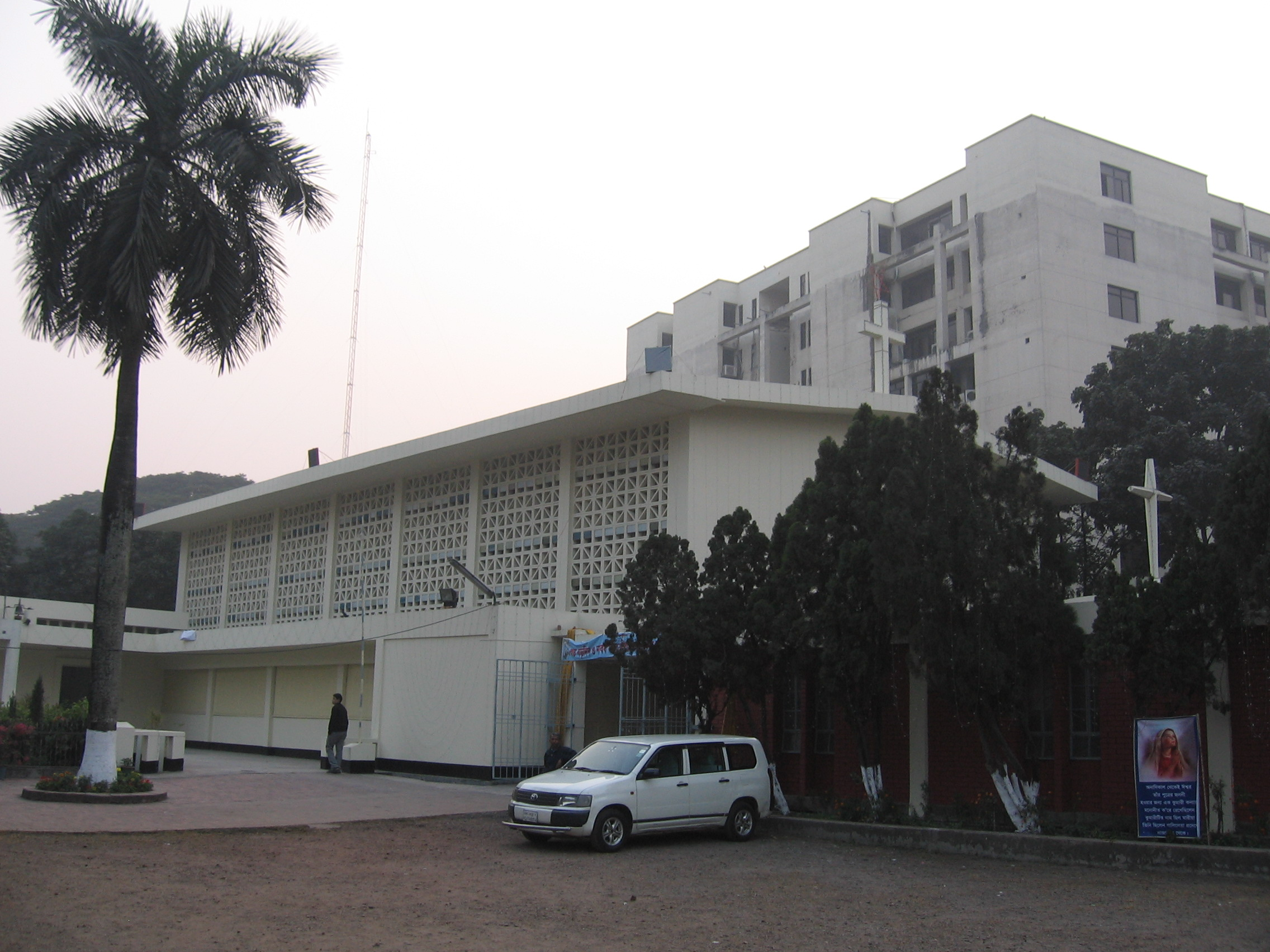
- The Cathedral of the Immaculate Conception at the Archdiocese of Dhaka, the largest Catholic Church in Bangladesh.
- Type: Catholic
- Orientation: mainly Latin Church
- Scripture: Catholic Bible
- Theology: Catholic Theology
- Polity: Episcopal
- Governance: Catholic Bishops' Conference of Bangladesh (CBCB)
- Pope: Leo XIV
- President of CBCB: Bejoy Nicephorus D'Cruze
- Apostolic Nuncio: Kevin Stuart Randall
- Region: Bangladesh & its territory
- Language: Primarily Bengali, English & Latin
- Liturgy: Latin along with Roman
- Headquarters: Dhaka, Bangladesh
- Congregations: 200+
- Members: 500,000+ as of 2024
- Official website: cbcbsec.org

The Catholic Church in Bangladesh is a part of the worldwide Catholic Church, under the spiritual leadership of the Pope in Rome.

== History ==
About 60% of Catholics come from "tribals", members of minority tribes. As of 2016, there were approximately 350,000, approximately 0.2 percent of the population of Bangladesh; and by 2022, the number were 400,000 Catholics in the country.

In 1598, the first priest arrived in Bangladesh accompanying the Portuguese.

As of 2017, the country is made up of eight dioceses including two archdioceses. Patrick D'Rozario was the country's first ever cardinal. He retired in 2020.

The Catholic Bishops' Conference of Bangladesh, founded in 1971, is the General Body of the Ordinaries of Bangladesh. The purpose of this Conference is to facilitate common policy and action in matters that affect or are liable to affect the interest of the Catholic Church in Bangladesh and to be of service to the country at large. Pope John Paul II visited Dhaka in November 1986.

Pope Francis visited Bangladesh in November 2017.

== Persecution ==
The U.S. State Department and human rights groups have cited Bangladesh as a nation of concern with regard to violence against religious minorities, including Hindus and Christians. A notable incident of violence against Christians was a 2001 bomb attack on a Catholic church during Sunday Mass, killing nine and maiming dozens. Since the rise of al-Qaida and ISIS, violence, threats and various forms of oppression against non-Muslims have increased in Bangladesh, and a 2014 State Department report noted insufficient government efforts to protect religious minorities.

In January 2014, homes were set ablaze and eight Catholics were injured, allegedly for exercising their right to vote in the nation's parliamentary elections. In July 2014, a mob of 60 stormed a Catholic convent, where they proceeded to beat up nuns and a priest. In April 2015, a mob attacked churchgoers and stabbed a priest during Easter Mass.

In December 2015, three adult siblings in a Catholic family were attacked while inside their home. Two of them were injured critically.

In early February 2016, a group of 20 raided a church and a convent at night. Nuns were beaten and property was looted. In July 2016, nearly two dozen people were killed by gunman during an attack on a popular restaurant in Dhaka where Christians and other non-Muslims, mostly foreigners, were known to frequent.

== Organisation ==
In 2023, there are 41 bishops in the country. There also over 400 priests and 1000 nuns.

The Apostolic Nuncio, or papal ambassador, normally a Titular Archbishop, heads the Apostolic Nunciature (the Vatican's embassy), to Bangladesh. Archbishop George Kocherry was the Apostolic Nuncio to Bangladesh from 2013 to 2022.

The Catholic Church is noted that the second largest provider of education in the country, with approximately 270 schools.

=== Dioceses in Bangladesh ===
- Archdiocese of Dhaka
  - Diocese of Dinajpur
  - Diocese of Mymensingh
  - Diocese of Rajshahi
  - Diocese of Sylhet
- Archdiocese of Chittagong
  - Diocese of Barisal
  - Diocese of Khulna

== See also ==
- Religion in Bangladesh
- Christianity in Bangladesh
- Catholic Church by country
