= Patrick D'Rozario =

Bangladeshi prelate

His Eminence Patrick D'Rozario CSC
- Cardinal, Archbishop emeritus of Dhaka
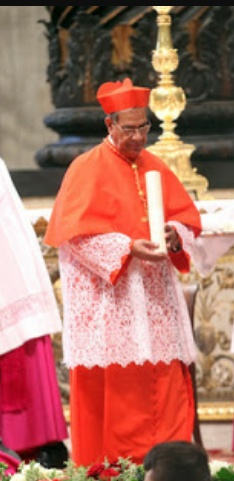
- Church: Roman Catholic Church
- Archdiocese: Dhaka
- Installed: 22 October 2012
- Term ended: 30 September 2020
- Predecessor: Paulinus Costa
- Successor: Bejoy Nicephorus D'Cruze
- Other post: Cardinal-Priest of Nostra Signora del Santissimo Sacramento e Santi Martiri Canadesi (2016–)
- Previous posts: Bishop of Rajshahi (1990–1995); Bishop of Chittagong (1995–2010); Coadjutor Archbishop of Dhaka (2010–2012)

Orders
- Ordination: 8 October 1972
- Consecration: 12 September 1990 by Theotonius Gomes
- Created cardinal: 19 November 2016 by Pope Francis
- Rank: Cardinal-Priest

Personal details
- Born: Patrick D'Rozario; 1 October 1943 (age 83) Padrishibpur, Barisal, British India
- Denomination: Roman Catholicism
- Motto: Joy in Communion

Ordination history of Patrick D'Rozario
History
Episcopal consecration
- Principal consecrator: Theotonius Gomes, CSC
- Co-consecrators: Michael Rozario; Pietro Biggio
Cardinalate
- Elevated by: Pope Francis
Episcopal succession
Bishops consecrated by Patrick D'Rozario as principal consecrator
- Lawrence Subrata Howlader, CSC: 3 July 2003
- James Romen Boiragi: 15 June 2012
- Shorot Francis Gomes: 22 April 2016

Styles of Patrick D'Rozario, CSC
- Reference style: His Eminence
- Spoken style: Your Eminence
- Religious style: Cardinal
- Informal style: Cardinal

Patrick D'Rozario, CSC (Bengali: প্যাট্রিক ডি'রোজারিও, romanized: Pyaṭrik ḍi'rojario; born 1 October 1943) is a Bangladeshi prelate of the Catholic Church who was Archbishop of Dhaka from 2012 to 2020. Pope Francis appointed him as a cardinal in 2016. Patrick D'Rozario is the very first Roman Catholic cardinal from Bangladesh. He led other dioceses in Bangladesh from 1995 to 2010.

== Biography ==
Patrick D'Rozario was born on 1 October 1943 in Padrishibpur, Backergunge district, British India (now part of Bangladesh). He took his vows as a member of the Congregation of Holy Cross on 14 June 1962 and was ordained a priest by the Servant of God Archbishop Theotonius Amal Ganguly on 8 October 1972.

On 21 May 1990, Pope John Paul II appointed D'Rozario the first Bishop of Rajshahi, a diocese newly created from the Diocese of Dinajpur. He received his episcopal consecration on 12 September 1990 from Bishop Theotonius Gomes of Dinajpur. On 3 February 1995, Pope John Paul named him Bishop of Chittagong. On 25 November 2010, he was appointed Coadjutor Archbishop of Dhaka by Pope Benedict XVI. On 22 October 2012, he succeeded Archbishop Paulinus Costa as Archbishop of Dhaka.

As president of the Catholic Bishops' Conference of Bangladesh, he attended the Synod on the Family in October 2014. He has also served as Chair of the Governing Body of Notre Dame College, Dhaka by his ex officio virtue as archdiocesan bishop from 2012 to 2020, even after being elevated to the cardinalate.

Pope Francis raised D'Rozario to the rank of cardinal at a consistory held on 19 November 2016. He was given the rank of Cardinal-Priest and assigned the titular church of Nostra Signora del Santissimo Sacramento e Santi Martiri Canadesi. He was the second member of his order to join the College of Cardinals, after John O'Hara, Archbishop of Philadelphia, in 1958. Francis made him a member of the Dicastery for Promoting Integral Human Development on 23 December 2017.

Pope Francis accepted D'Rozario's resignation as Archbishop of Dhaka on 30 September 2020, for he has sent his retirement letter two years prior in 2018, upon turning the clerical retirement age of 75.

Catholic Church titles
Preceded by Paulinus Costa	Archbishop of Dhaka; 2012–2020	Succeeded by Bejoy Nicephorus D'Cruze
Preceded by Joachim J. Rozario	Bishop of Chittagong; 1995–2010	Succeeded by Moses M. Costa
New title	Bishop of Rajshahi; 1990–1995	Succeeded by Paulinus Costa
Preceded by Jean-Claude Turcotte	Cardinal Priest of Nostra Signora del Santissimo Sacramento e Santi Martiri Canadesi; 2016–present	Incumbent
