= Diocese of Rajshahi =

Roman Catholic diocese in Bangladesh

Coordinates: 24.3801°N 88.5716°E

Diocese of Rajshahi Diœcesis Raishahiensis রাজশাহী ধর্মপ্রদেশ

Location
- Country: Bangladesh
- Ecclesiastical province: Dhaka
- Metropolitan: Dhaka

Statistics
- Area: 18,063 km^{2} (6,974 sq mi)
- Population: Total; Catholics: (as of 2004); 29,190,000; 59,630 (0.4%)

Information
- Denomination: Roman Catholic
- Rite: Latin Rite
- Established: 21 May 1990
- Cathedral: Cathedral of Christ the Redeemer in Rajshahi
- Patron saint: Good Shepherd

Current leadership
- Pope: Leo XIV
- Bishop: Gervas Rozario
- Metropolitan Archbishop: Patrick D'Rozario, CSC

The Roman Catholic Diocese of Rajshahi (Latin: Diœcesis Raishahiensis) is a diocese located in the city of Rajshahi in the ecclesiastical province of Dhaka in Bangladesh.

== History ==
- May 21, 1990: Established as the Diocese of Rajshahi from the Diocese of Dinajpur

== Leadership ==
- Bishops of Rajshahi (Roman rite)
  - Bishop Patrick D’Rozario, C.S.C. (May 21, 1990 – February 3, 1995), appointed Bishop of Chittagong; future Archbishop and Cardinal
  - Bishop Paulinus Costa (January 11, 1996 – July 9, 2004), appointed Archbishop of Dhaka
  - Bishop Gervas Rozario (January 15, 2005 – present)

== Information ==
- High School = 3

St. Louis High School, Jonail, Natore, Bangladesh. St. Joseph High School and College, Bonpara, Natore, Bangladesh. St. Rita's High School, Chatmohor, Pabna, Bangladesh.

- Primary School = 17
- Parish = 19
- Seminary = 1
- Health Center = 13

== Prominent Persons ==
1. Denis C Baskey, Director, Caritas Rajshahi Region
2. William Atul Kuluntunu, Joint Sectary (OSD), Ministry of Entailment
