= Catholic Bishops' Conference of Bangladesh =

Assembly of Catholic bishops

The Catholic Bishops' Conference of Bangladesh is the episcopal conference of Bangladesh.

== History ==
The CBCB was founded in 1971. The purpose of this Conference is to facilitate common policy and action in matters that affect or are liable to affect the interest of the Catholic Church in Bangladesh and to be of service to the country at large. Prior to the establishment of Bangladesh, the bishops of Bangladesh were members of the Catholic Bishops' Conference of Pakistan.

As of June 2026, the president of the Catholic Bishops' Conference of Bangladesh is Cardinal Bejoy Nicephorus D'Cruze, the Archbishop of Dhaka.

== See also ==
- Roman Catholicism in Bangladesh
- Christianity in Bangladesh
