= Diocese of Dinajpur =

Roman Catholic diocese in Bangladesh

Coordinates: 25.6097°N 88.6299°E

Diocese of Dinajpur Diœcesis Dinaipurensis দিনাজপুর ধর্মপ্রদেশ

Location
- Country: Bangladesh
- Ecclesiastical province: Dhaka
- Metropolitan: Dhaka

Statistics
- Area: 17,500 km^{2} (6,800 sq mi)
- Population: Total; Catholics: (as of 2013); 16,827,061; 54,082 (0.3%)

Information
- Denomination: Roman Catholic
- Rite: Latin Rite
- Established: 1927; 98 years ago
- Cathedral: Cathedral of St Francis Xavier in Dinajpur
- Patron saint: Saint Francis Xavier

Current leadership
- Pope: Leo XIV
- Bishop: Sebastian Tudu
- Metropolitan Archbishop: Patrick D'Rozario, CSC

The Roman Catholic Diocese of Dinajpur (Latin: Diœcesis Dinaipurensis) is a diocese located in Dinajpur District, Rajshahi Division, in the ecclesiastical province of Dhaka in Bangladesh.

== History ==
- May 25, 1927: Established as Diocese of Dinajpur from the Diocese of Krishnagar

== Bishops ==
- Bishops of Dinajpur (Roman rite)
  - Bishop Santino Taveggia, P.I.M.E. (1927 – 1928)
  - Bishop Giovanni Battista Anselmo, P.I.M.E. (February 7, 1929 – October 16, 1947)
  - Bishop Joseph Obert, P.I.M.E. (December 9, 1948 – September 5, 1968)
  - Bishop Michael Rozario (September 5, 1968 – December 17, 1977), appointed Archbishop of Dacca
  - Bishop Theotonius Gomes, C.S.C. (December 19, 1978 – February 23, 1996)
  - Bishop Moses Costa, C.S.C. (July 5, 1996 – April 6, 2011), appointed Bishop of Chittagong
  - Bishop Sebastian Tudu (October 29, 2011 – present)

=== Other priest of this diocese who became bishop ===
- Gervas Rozario (priest here, 1980–1990), appointed Bishop of Rajshahi in 2007
