= Archdiocese of Dhaka =

Roman Catholic archdiocese in Bangladesh

Coordinates: 23.7369°N 90.4052°E

Archdiocese of Dhaka Archidiœcesis Dhakensis ঢাকা মহাধর্মপ্রদেশ
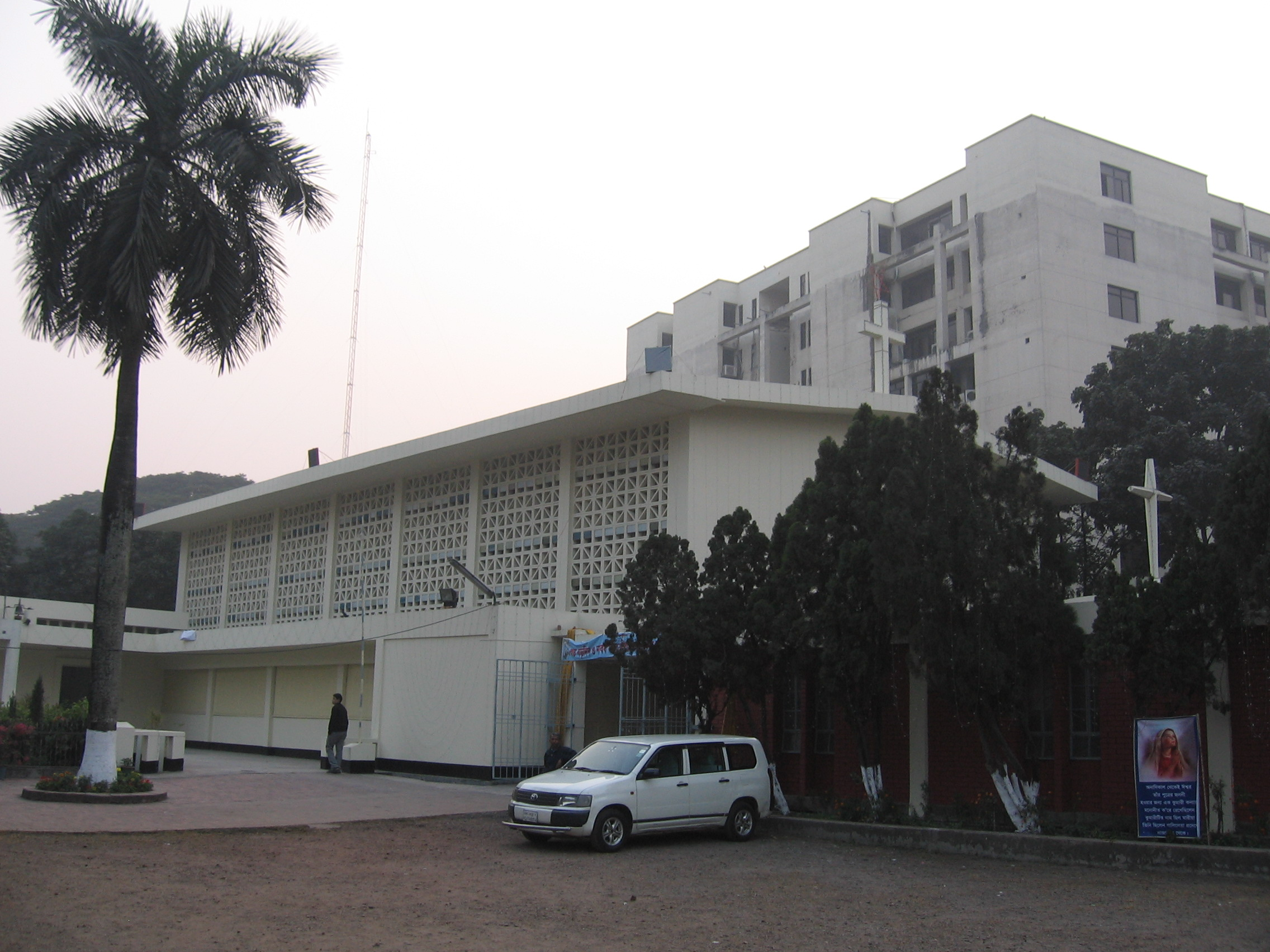
- The Cathedral of the Immaculate Conception, Dhaka

Location
- Country: Bangladesh
- Ecclesiastical province: Dhaka

Statistics
- Area: 14,193 km^{2} (5,480 sq mi)
- Population: Total; Catholics: (as of 2013); 23,339,945; 62,780 (0.3%)
- Parishes: 18

Information
- Denomination: Roman Catholic
- Sui iuris church: Latin Church
- Rite: Roman Rite
- Established: 19 October 1982 (as Archdiocese of Dhaka)
- Cathedral: St. Mary's Cathedral, Dhaka
- Patron saint: Immaculate Conception
- Secular priests: 125

Current leadership
- Pope: Leo XIV
- Archbishop: Bejoy Nicephorus D'Cruze
- Suffragans: Diocese of Dinajpur; Diocese of Mymensingh; Diocese of Rajshahi; Diocese of Sylhet
- Bishops emeritus: Patrick D'Rozario

The Roman Catholic Archdiocese of Dhaka (Latin: Archidiœcesis Dhakensis) is the Latin, main Metropolitan diocese of the Roman Catholic Church in Bangladesh, but no longer the only one. It still depends on the missionary Roman Congregation for the Evangelization of Peoples.

The archdiocese's Marian mother church and thus seat of its archbishop is St. Mary's Cathedral in the national capital Dhaka. As senior Metropolitan in Bangladesh, it is the principal episcopal see of that country. As of 2020 the Archbishop of Dhaka is Bejoy Nicephorus D'Cruze, formerly Bishop of Sylhet, having been appointed by Pope Francis in September 2020.

== Ecclesiastical province ==
Its ecclesiastical province still has as suffragan sees

- Roman Catholic Diocese of Dinajpur
- Roman Catholic Diocese of Joypurhat
- Roman Catholic Diocese of Mymensingh
- Roman Catholic Diocese of Rajshahi
- Roman Catholic Diocese of Sylhet.

On 2 February 2017, it lost as suffragans the newly created Metropolitan Roman Catholic Archdiocese of Chittagong and both its suffragan sees: Barisal and Kulna.

== History ==
It was erected it as the Apostolic Vicariate of Eastern Bengal by Pope Pius IX on 12 February 1850.

It was promoted as Diocese of Eastern Bengal on 1 September 1886, and renamed as the Diocese of Dacca after its see in 1887.

On 25 May 1927 it lost territory to establish the Diocese of Chittagong, as its suffragan, but since 2017 itself a Metropolitan.

It was elevated to Metropolitan Archdiocese of Dacca by Pope Pius XII on 15 July 1950.

On 17 January 1952 it lost territory to establish the Apostolic Prefecture of Haflong.

It enjoyed its papal visit, from Pope Paul VI, in November 1970.

Pope John Paul II renamed it as the Archdiocese of Dhaka on 19 October 1982.

It enjoyed a second papal visit from Pope John Paul II in November 1986.

It lost territory on 15 May 1987 to establish the Diocese of Mymensingh and on 8 July 2011 again to establish the Diocese of Sylhet, as its suffragans.

== Leadership ==
=== Ordinaries ===
Below is a list of individuals who have led the Archdiocese of Dhaka and its antecedent jurisdictions since its founding.

==== Apostolic Vicars of Eastern Bengal ====
- Thomas Oliffe (1850–1855), appointed Apostolic Vicar of Western Bengal
- Fr. Louis Verité (1855–1860), as Pro-Apostolic Vicar
- Pierre Dufal (1860–1876), resigned; in 1878, appointed Coadjutor Bishop of Galveston, U.S.
- Giordano Ballsieper (1878–1886)

==== Bishops of Dhaka ====
- Augustin Louage (1890–1894)
- Peter Joseph Hurth (1894–1909), appointed Bishop of Nueva Segovia, Philippines
- Frederick Linneborn (1909 –1915)
- Amand-Théophile-Joseph Legrand (1916–1929)
- Timothy Joseph Crowley (1929–1945)
- Lawrence Leo Graner (1947–1950 see below)

==== Archbishops of Dacca ====
- Lawrence Leo Graner (see above 1950–1967)
- Theotonius Amal Ganguly (1967–1977)

==== Archbishops of Dhaka ====
- Michael Rozario (1977–2005)
- Paulinus Costa (2005–2012)
- Patrick D'Rozario (2012–2020)
- Bejoy Nicephorus D'Cruze (2020–present)

=== Coadjutor bishops ===
Under the Code of Canon Law, the coadjutor bishop has the right of succession (cum jure successionis) upon the death, retirement or resignation of the diocesan bishop he is assisting. All coadjutor ordinaries eventually succeeded to become head of the Archdiocese of Dhaka or its antecedent jurisdictions.

- Timothy Joseph Crowley (1927–1929)
- Theotonius Amal Ganguly (1965–1967)
- Patrick D’Rozario (2010–2012)

=== Auxiliary Bishops ===
- Theotonius Amal Ganguly (1960–1965), appointed coadjutor of this archdiocese
- Shorot Francis Gomes (2016–2022), appointed Bishop of Sylhet
- Theotonius Gomes (1996–2014)
- Subroto Boniface Gomes (2024-)

== Statistics ==
As per 2014, it pastorally served 64,960 Catholics (0.3% of 23,539,280 total) on 12,000 km^{2} in 18 parishes and 14 missions with 115 priests (42 diocesan, 73 religious), 695 lay religious (132 brothers, 563 sisters) and 17 seminarians.

Year	Catholics	Diocesan priest	Parishes
2000	70,821	42	19
2015	62,780	52	18

== See also ==
- Archbishop's House, Ramna Thana
- Roman Catholicism in Bangladesh
- List of Roman Catholic dioceses in Bangladesh

== Sources and external links ==
- GCatholic.org with incumbent bio links
- Catholic-Hierarchy
