= Diocese of Sylhet =

Roman Catholic diocese in Bangladesh

Coordinates: 24.4875°N 91.7664°E

Diocese of Sylhet Diœcesis Sylhetensis সিলেট ধর্মপ্রদেশ

Location
- Country: Bangladesh
- Ecclesiastical province: Dhaka

Statistics
- Area: 12,595 km^{2} (4,863 sq mi)
- Population: Total; Catholics: (as of 2012); 10,000,000; 16,707 (0.2%)
- Parishes: 7

Information
- Denomination: Roman Catholic
- Sui iuris church: Latin Church
- Rite: Roman Rite
- Established: 8 July 2011
- Cathedral: Pro-Cathedral of the Divine Mercy in Moulvibazar

Current leadership
- Pope: Leo XIV
- Bishop: Shorot Francis Gomes

The Roman Catholic Diocese of Sylhet (Latin: Diœcesis Sylhetensis) is a diocese in Bangladesh, and comprises the civil districts of Sylhet, Sunamganj, Habiganj, and Moulvibazar. It lies in the Ecclesiastical province of Dhaka in Bangladesh.

== Leadership ==
Bishops of Sylhet (Latin Church)

- Bejoy Nicephorus D'Cruze (8 July 2011 – 30 September 2020)
- Shorot Francis Gomes (12 May 2021 – present)

== History ==
Sylhet was erected as a diocese on 30 September 2011. Pope Benedict XVI announced it on 8 July 2011. This new Diocese consists of four civil districts covering 12,594 sq. k. m. The total population is about 10 million. There are 17,000 Catholics.

During the time of British rule, the Catholics of the Tea-Estate people, Khasias and Mandi indigenous people were given service from a Parish in Assam (India). After the partition in 1947, it was not possible for a priest to come to Pakistan from India. The entire area of Sylhet was given to the Archdiocese of Dacca. Archbishop Graner sent Vincent Delivi to visit the area and see what the Archbishop had inherited. Delivi toured the vast area and found, he reported 700 Catholics among the tea garden workers and the Khasia. The baptism register was copied from Assam and showed 903 baptisms dating back to 1910. Delivi was assigned to that area. He then established the first Mission in 1950 at Srimongol. He built a house there and named that ‘Rat Hole’. He toured the area often on foot. For him it was difficult to travel in the hilly area. He tried to make friends with the Tea Estate managers in order to have access to the villages and the people. Delivi celebrated the first Mass in the new parish in 1952 in Burmacherra Tea Estate. On the following year (1951) the second Parish was established in Mugaipar, now it is under the Oblate Fathers.

Delivi literally wore out his knees with the difficult walking and was later somewhat crippled. A long era of almost 40 years began with the arrival in Srimangal of Joseph Voorde and Joseph Lehane and the establishment of a parish. The compound housed very little, including no church, because the parish was ‘Mobile’ going to the people. Voorde basically looked after the parish and Lehane toured. Lehane baptized himself in all those years thousands of the people. There was a vast territory under Parishes of Srimangal and Mugaipar. It was split in 1975 when the Oblate Fathers took over and established Khadim. At that time, diocesan fathers too were working in St. Thomas’ Church, in Sunamganj district. The archdiocese entrusted St. Thomas parish of Mugaipar to the Oblates in 1979. Soon after the arrival of the Oblates in greater Sylhet, they expanded their work of evangelization to different areas and thus established different parish/mission centre. In the beginning of their mission in Sylhet, they lived in a rented house but they later built the parish and residence at Khadim Nagar. Parishes/missions established by the oblates are; De Mazenod Church, Khadim Nagar (1975), Immaculate Conception Church, Lokhipur (1981), St. Patrick's Church, Jaflong (2002), Divine Mercy Mission, Borolekha (2010) and St. Anthony's Church, Rajai. There are 7 parishes in the Diocese of Sylhet. There are six parishes under the Oblate Fathers and one parish under the Holy Cross Fathers. There are 10,000 Catholics under Srimongol Parish under the Holy Cross Fathers. There are three male and five female congregations who are serving this diocese. The priests and religious are all together about 45. This new diocese has 2 local priests and the Archdiocese of Dhaka gave two more local priests to serve this diocese.
