= Neochromadora nicolae =

Scientific classification
- Kingdom: Animalia
- Phylum: Nematoda
- Class: Chromadorea
- Order: Chromadorida
- Family: Chromadoridae
- Genus: Neochromadora
- Species: N. nicolae

Binomial name
- Neochromadora nicolae Vincx, 1986

Species of nematode

Neochromadora nicolae is a species of nematode in the family Chromadoridae. It was formally described in 1986 and is known from the Southern Bight.

== Taxonomy and etymology ==
Magda Vincx formally described the species in 1986 and named it after the nematologist Nicole Smol. The type locality is the Southern Bight, located in the North Sea.

== Description ==
Males range from 0.95 to 1.2 millimeters long and females range from 1.03 to 1.27 millimeters long.

The markings on the cuticle are more subdued compared to other species of its genus. At 8 microns, the cephalic setae (setae arranged in a small circle around the mouth) are less than half as long as the body diameter of that area. Inside the mouth are well developed teeth, with one on the upper side, two more in the lower half, and many smaller teeth on the bottom. Each spicule (long, rigid organs exclusive to males which are used during mating) has two cusps at the tip. Past the cloaca in males are eight very small preanal supplements which are equally spaced from each other. The females are similar to Neochromadora munita, but have smaller setae around the mouth and more subdued markings on the cuticle.

== Habitat and distribution ==
Neochromadora nicolae is known from the Southern Bight, where the holotype was collected from medium or fine sand at a depth of 15 meters.
