= Ethmolaimus =

Scientific classification
- Kingdom: Animalia
- Phylum: Nematoda
- Class: Chromadorea
- Order: Chromadorida
- Family: Chromadoridae
- Genus: Ethmolaimus de Man, 1880

Genus of roundworms

Ethmolaimus is a genus of nematodes belonging to the family Chromadoridae.

The species of this genus are found in Europe and Northern America.

Species:

- Ethmolaimus bothnicus Jensen, 1994
- Ethmolaimus hailuotoensis Turpeenniemi, 1995
- Ethmolaimus hirsutus (Gerlach, 1956) Jensen, 1994
- Ethmolaimus multipapillatus Paramonov, 1926
- Ethmolaimus pratensis de Man, 1880
