= Praeacanthonchus kreisi =

Scientific classification
- Kingdom: Animalia
- Phylum: Nematoda
- Class: Chromadorea
- Order: Chromadorida
- Family: Cyatholaimidae
- Genus: Praeacanthonchus
- Species: P. kreisi

Binomial name
- Praeacanthonchus kreisi (Allgén, 1929)

Synonyms
- Paracanthonchus kreisi Allgén, 1929

Species of roundworm

Praeacanthonchus kreisi is a species of nematodes from the Cyatholaimidae family. The scientific name of this species was first published in 1929 by Carl Allgén.
