= Timmia parva =

Scientific classification
- Domain: Eukaryota
- Kingdom: Animalia
- Phylum: Nematoda
- Class: Chromadorea
- Order: Chromadorida
- Family: Chromadoridae
- Genus: Timmia
- Species: T. parva

Binomial name
- Timmia parva (Timm, 1952)

Synonyms
- Parachromadora parva Timm, 1952

Species of roundworm

Timmia parva is a species of nematode in the family Chromadoridae, described in 1952 by Richard William Timm.
