= Richard William Timm =

American priest, educator, zoologist, and activist (1923–2020)

Father Richard William Timm C.S.C
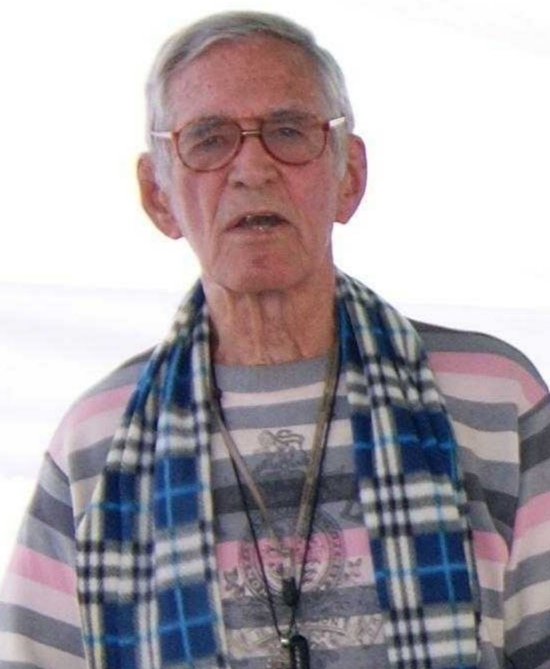
- Timm at CORR–The Jute Works (2012)
- Born: March 2, 1923; Michigan City, Indiana, United States
- Died: September 11, 2020 (aged 97); South Bend, Indiana, United States
- Education: University of Notre Dame; Catholic University of America
- Occupations: Catholic priest, educator, zoologist, researcher and activist
- Organizations: University of California, Davis; Notre Dame College, Dhaka; Food and Agriculture Council, Pakistan; SEATO; Cyclone Rehabilitation Project, Monpura Island; Caritas Bangladesh; Commission for Justice and Peace; Coordinating Council for Human Rights, Bangladesh; South Asia Forum for Human Rights
- Awards: Pro Ecclesia et Pontifice; Ramon Magsaysay Award; Abu Sayeed Chowhurry Award

Richard William Timm (March 2, 1923 – September 11, 2020) was a Catholic Priest, educator, zoologist, and development worker. He was the Superior of the Congregation of Holy Cross in Dhaka and a member of the Sacred Heart of Jesus Province. He was also one of the founders of Notre Dame College in Dhaka, Bangladesh. He was the 6th principal (1970 to 1972) of Notre Dame College.

== Family ==
Born with German ancestry from both sides on March 2, 1923, in Michigan City, Indiana, USA, Timm was the second of four siblings – elder brother Bob, who died on Okinawa in World War II, and younger sisters Mary Jo Schiel and Genevieve Gantner.

== Research works ==
Timm, as a biologist, conducted exclusive surveys on nematodes and discovered over 250 new species.

His scientific expeditions involved a landscape spanning from Antarctica Penguin Colonies to the Mangrove of South Asia. Many of his expeditions were confined in the area of the Sundarbans and other parts of South Asia, but he also did expeditions in Africa, Europe, Antarctica and the Americas.

Among others, Timm described the following taxa:

- Timmia parva – marine nematode
- Two varieties of Aphelenchoides – marine nematodes; with Dr. Mary Franklyn
- Imponema, Filiponema and Plutellonema – three new genera of earth nematodes; with Dr. Armand Maggenti
- Two varieties of Megadontolaimus – a marine nematode genus from Cox's Bazar
- The genus, Metasabatieria, together with its type species, Metasabatieria primigena, from the Bay of Bengal

His zoological author abbreviation is Timm.

== Works in spreading education ==
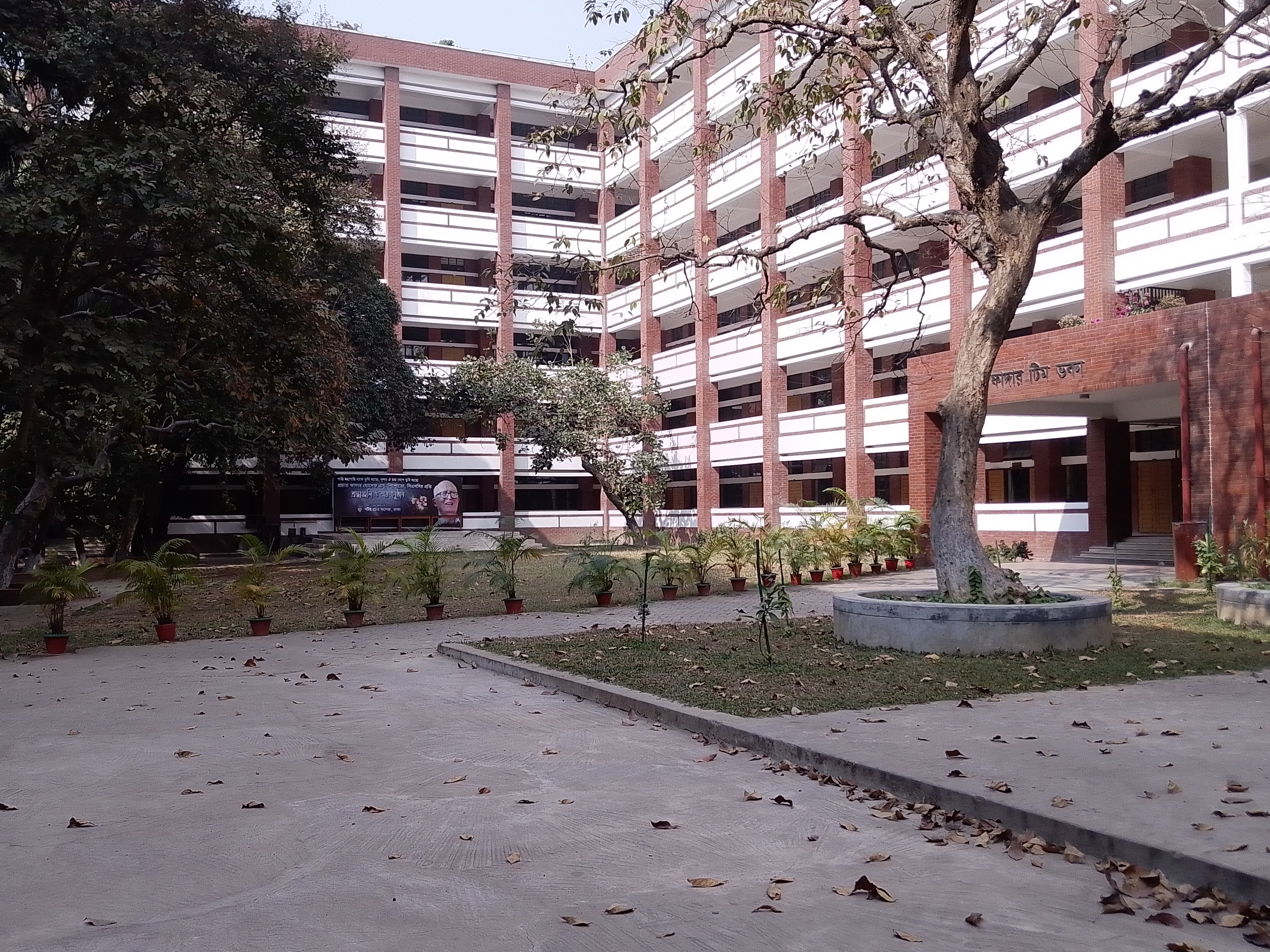
Father Richard Timm Building at Notre Dame College

Since 1952, Timm worked in the education sector, first in the east Bengal province of Pakistan, and then Bangladesh. Timm was the principal of Notre Dame College for the term 1970–71, and worked as the director of studies as well. He was still connected to the college though not taking part in academic activities. He was the founder of the science departments in Notre Dame College and the pioneer for the club activities. He was also the founder of Notre Dame Debating Club and Notre Dame Science Club, the first debating club and the first science club in Bangladesh.

Timm's Textbook of College Biology served as a textbook for East Pakistani – Bangladeshi schools for many years. This text is actually an extension of a book by A. Bhuya of Dhaka Government College, but not much of the original version was preserved in the extension.

== Social development activities ==
Timm was the first planning officer of Christian Organization for Relief and Rehabilitation (CORR) in 1970. He became the director when the organization renamed itself to Caritas Bangladesh. He guided the formation of the Association of the Development Agencies in Bangladesh (ADAB), which later became the association of more than 130 NGOs of Bangladesh. He is considered to be the "father of NGOs" in Bangladesh.

Timm served the Justice and Peace Commission as the executive secretary for almost 23 years from its inception in 1974. He conducted a study on over 1000 workers from 51 export-oriented ready-made garment factories while serving the JPC as the executive secretary. He evaluated the pay scale, freedom of association, and maternity leave of the workers with the help of the students of Notre Dame College, Dhaka and Holy Cross College, Dhaka; later, the results were published in the mainstream media in Bangladesh.

Timm visited the Chittagong Hill Tracts and authored three books where he focused on the deprivation of land rights of the indigenous people of those areas. He revealed the confidential plan of the Bangladesh government to rehabilitate 200 poor families from different areas of Bangladesh to the hill tracts. According to Timm, the government allegedly sent letters to each district of the country to provide land of 5 to 10 acres to each family; later, these families were alleged to take land from the indigenous inhabitants forcefully, where the army and the local governing structures allegedly helped them due to the local politics.

He founded the South Asia Forum for Human Rights (SAFHR), and was its chief for three years. He also founded CORR the Jute Works.

Timm founded the Coordinator Council for Human Rights in Bangladesh (CCHRB) and served as its president for three terms, until 1993. He also worked with Justice KM Sobhan to assess human rights in Myanmar, especially the human rights violations of the local workers deployed in the extension of the pipeline of Yadana gas field. He presented the results to the Committee on International Relations of the US House of Representatives.

== Activities during the Liberation War of Bangladesh ==
=== Activities during the war ===
Timm expressed his opinion against the genocide of the liberation war of Bangladesh through his writing. He emphasized the difficult situations of civilians and the violation of human rights. His letters written to Rohde served to build public opinion around the world and especially in the United States against the war in Bangladesh.

He also conducted relief works for the distressed at the time of the war.

=== Activities on reconstruction ===
After the liberation war of Bangladesh, Timm actively took part in the newborn country's reconstruction work, together with the UN, USAID, CORR (Christian Organization for Relief and Rehabilitation, later Caritas) and CRS. The rehabilitation effort was conducted for the homeless and those who had lost all in the war.

== Disaster response ==
On November 12, 1970, a great cyclone struck the coastal areas of East Pakistan and killed at least 50,000 people. Timm, assisted by the students of Notre Dame College, CORR (Christian Organization for Relief and Rehabilitation, later Caritas) and HELP (Heartland Emergency Life-Saving Project), conducted several relief expeditions in the affected areas. The response was among the biggest of those taken by non-government people.

In other disasters, including the great flood of 1998, Notre Dame College and Caritas both participated in the relief effort, both in and out of Dhaka City, under the participation and influence of Timm.

== Death ==
Timm died in South Bend, Indiana on September 11, 2020.

== Publications ==
Timm's publications include numerous research papers and books.

=== Books ===
- Timm, Richard W. (1995). Forty Years in Bangladesh: Memoirs of Father Timm. Caritas Bangladesh.
- The Plant-Parasitic Nematodes of Thailand and The Philippines, published by SEATO in 1965

== Awards and recognition ==
Timm was awarded the Ramon Magsaysay Award in 1987 for International Understanding.

In response to his activities for development, Timm was honored with citizenship from three different governments.

Among the many varieties of nematodes he discovered, the marine nematode Timmia parva was named after Timm himself.

== See also ==
- List of Ramon Magsaysay Award winners
