= Achromadora =

Scientific classification
- Domain: Eukaryota
- Kingdom: Animalia
- Phylum: Nematoda
- Class: Chromadorea
- Order: Chromadorida
- Family: Achromadoridae
- Genus: Achromadora; Cobb, 1913

Genus of worms

Achromadora is a genus of nematodes belonging to the family Achromadoridae.

The genus has almost cosmopolitan distribution.

Species:

- Achromadora arenicola Vinciguerra & Orselli, 1997
- Achromadora buikensis (Steiner, 1921) Mikoletzky, 1925
- Achromadora chungsani (Hoeppli & Chu, 1932) Andrássy, 1984
- Achromadora dubia (Bütchli, 1973) Micoletzky, 1925
- Achromadora gracilis Ocaňa, Hernadez & Monterrubio, 1999
- Achromadora granulata (Cobb, 1913)
- Achromadora indica Tahseen, 2001
- Achromadora inermis Altherr, 1952
- Achromadora inflata Abebe & Coomans, 1996
- Achromadora longicauda Schneider, 1937
- Achromadora longiseta Schuurmans Stekhoven, 1951
- Achromadora micoletzkyi (Stefanski, 1915) Micoletzky, 1925
- Achromadora micoleztkyi (Stefanski, 1915) Van der Linde, 1938
- Achromadora papuana (Daday, 1899)
- Achromadora pseudomicoletzky van der Linde, 1938
- Achromadora pseudomicoletzkyi van der Linde, 1938
- Achromadora ruricola (De Man, 1880) Micoletzky, 1924
- Achromadora sedata Gagarin, 2001
- Achromadora semiarmata Altherr, 1952
- Achromadora subdubia Gagarin, 1971
- Achromadora tenax (de Man, 1876) Micoletzky, 1925
- Achromadora tenera (Schneider, 1925) Micoletzky, 1925
- Achromadora terricola (de Man, 1880) Micoletzky, 1924
- Achromadora thermophila Lemzina & Gagarin, 1994
- Achromadora walkeri Banna & Gardner, 1993
