= Reduced to Ashes =

Reduced to Ashes may refer to:

- Reduced to Ashes (Deeds of Flesh album), released in 2003
- Reduced to Ashes (Memorain album), released in 2006
- Reduced to Ashes: The Insurgency and Human Rights in Punjab, 2003 book
