= Neochromadora =

Scientific classification
- Kingdom: Animalia
- Phylum: Nematoda
- Class: Chromadorea
- Order: Chromadorida
- Family: Chromadoridae
- Subfamily: Hypodontolaiminae
- Genus: Neochromadora; Micoletzky, 1924

Genus of nematodes

Neochromadora is a genus of nematodes belonging to the family Chromadoridae.

The genus has almost cosmopolitan distribution.

Species:

- Neochromadora aberrans Cobb, 1930
- Neochromadora alatocorpa Hopper, 1961
- Neochromadora alejandroi Lo Russo & Pastor de Ward, 2012
- Neochromadora amembranata Wieser, 1954
- Neochromadora angelica Riemann, 1976
- Neochromadora appiana Wieser, 1959
- Neochromadora bilineata Kito, 1978
- Neochromadora bonita Gerlach, 1956
- Neochromadora brevisetosa Wieser, 1954
- Neochromadora calathifera Wieser, 1954
- Neochromadora complexa Gerlach, 1953
- Neochromadora coudenhovei Wieser, 1956
- Neochromadora craspedota (Steiner, 1916) Micoletzky, 1924
- Neochromadora edentata (Cobb, 1914) Timm, 1978
- Neochromadora izhorica (Filipjev, 1929) Schuurmans-Stekhoven, 1935
- Neochromadora lateralis Wieser, 1954
- Neochromadora lineata Pastor de Ward, 1985
- Neochromadora munita Lorenzen, 1971
- Neochromadora nicolae Vincx, 1986
- Neochromadora nitida Timm, 1961
- Neochromadora notocraspedota Allgén, 1958
- Neochromadora orientalis Lemzina, 1982
- Neochromadora oshoroana Kito, 1981
- Neochromadora papillosa Pastor de Ward, 1985
- Neochromadora parabilineata Liang, Gou & Wang, 2024
- Neochromadora paratecta Blome, 1974
- Neochromadora poecilosoma (de Man, 1893) Micoletzky, 1924
- Neochromadora poecilosomoides (Filipjev, 1918) Micoletzky, 1924
- Neochromadora pugilator Wieser, 1959
- Neochromadora sabulicola (Filipjev, 1918) Wieser, 1954
- Neochromadora tecta Gerlach, 1951
- Neochromadora torquata Wieser, 1954
- Neochromadora trichophora (Steiner, 1921) Gerlach, 1951
