= Notre Dame College, Dhaka =

Catholic college in Dhaka, Bangladesh

- নটর ডেম কলেজ, ঢাকা
- Seal of Notre Dame College
- Other name: NDC
- Former name: St. Gregory's College
- Motto: Latin: Diligite Lumen Sapientiae
- Motto in English: Love the light of wisdom
- Type: Higher secondary school; Degree college
- Established: 3 November 1949; 77 years ago
- Accreditation: Dhaka Education Board
- Affiliations: National University, Bangladesh
- Religious affiliation: Catholic Church (Congregation of Holy Cross)
- Principal: Fr. Hemanto Pius Rozario, CSC (2012 – present)
- Vice-principal: Vacant since 2025
- Students: 7000 (as of 2019) male
- Location: Arambagh, Motijheel, Dhaka, Bangladesh; 23.7310°N 90.4209°E
- Campus: 5 acres (2.0 ha); Urban
- Language: Bangla and English
- Demonym: Notredamian
- Colors: Cream (Shirt); Black (Pants)
- Website: ndc.edu.bd

A cinematography featuring Notre Dame College, Dhaka

Notre Dame College, Dhaka (Bengali: নটর ডেম কলেজ, ঢাকা), also known as NDC, is a Catholic higher secondary and degree-level educational institution founded and managed by the priests of the Congregation of Holy Cross located in Dhaka, the capital of Bangladesh. Upon the invitation of the then East Pakistan government after the partition of India, St. Gregory's College was founded on 3 November 1949, as an expanded iteration of St. Gregory's High School in Laxmibazar, Dhaka. This was undertaken by the Roman Catholic priest community at the initiative of Archbishop Lawrence Graner and the decision of the Congregation of Holy Cross. In 1954, the college relocated to Arambagh near Kamalapur railway station under the jurisdiction of the Motijheel Thana and was dedicated to Mary, the mother of Jesus Christ, and was named Notre Dame College. The French phrase "Notre Dame" signifies Our Lady, but Notre Dame College has remained an all-boys institution since its establishment.

In 1950, Notre Dame College became affiliated with Dhaka University, and by 1959, it had earned recognition as the foremost educational institution in East Pakistan. Initially housing only the Humanities and Business departments at its inception, the college later introduced BA in 1955 and BSc in 1960. However, starting in the academic year 1972–73, the BSc course was discontinued. Presently, the college offers higher secondary and BA courses in both English and Bengali mediums. In 1992, it gained affiliation with the National University. Acknowledged as the nation's premier educational institution four times (1959, 1988, 1992, 1and 997) by the National University, this institution, managed by Christian missionaries, primarily serves the Christian community, tribes, minorities, and the underprivileged. Nonetheless, it welcomes students of all faiths and backgrounds. Since its establishment, a majority of the student body has comprised Bengali Muslims. As of 2019, statistics reveal that 85 percent of the institution's students are Muslims.

Notre Dame College is among the four institutions granted the privilege to conduct its admission test, as decreed by the Bangladesh Supreme Court in 2012.

== History ==
=== Early history ===
In 1947, following the partition of India, the newly established government of Pakistan made a formal request to the head of the Catholic Congregation to initiate the establishment of several colleges. At the government's invitation, Archbishop Lawrence Leo Graner directed the Congregation of Holy Cross priests to establish distinct colleges for boys and girls. On 3 November 1949, "St. Gregory's College" emerged within the premises of St. Gregory's High School at 82, Municipal Office Street, Laxmibazar, Dhaka. Founded by the Roman Catholic clergy community, the college commenced with 19 students enrolled in the Arts and Commerce departments.

In December 1950, the establishment relocated to 61/1 Subhash Bose Avenue, Laxmibazar. During that year, the college obtained affiliation with Dhaka University. Among the students admitted in 1951 was Kamal Hossain, who later became foreign minister of Bangladesh. By 1953, he achieved the top position in the Higher Secondary Examination across East Pakistan. In 1950, under the University of Dhaka, eight students undertook an examination, with five achieving success in the first division. By 1951, the institution's student count reached 55. During that year, college students performed William Shakespeare's The Tempest for three consecutive nights on the premises of St. Gregory's High School. Notably, among the students in 1952 was Sirajul Islam Chowdhury. In 1953, Richard William Timm initiated the inaugural debating club in the then East Pakistan, known as the Notre Dame Debating Club.

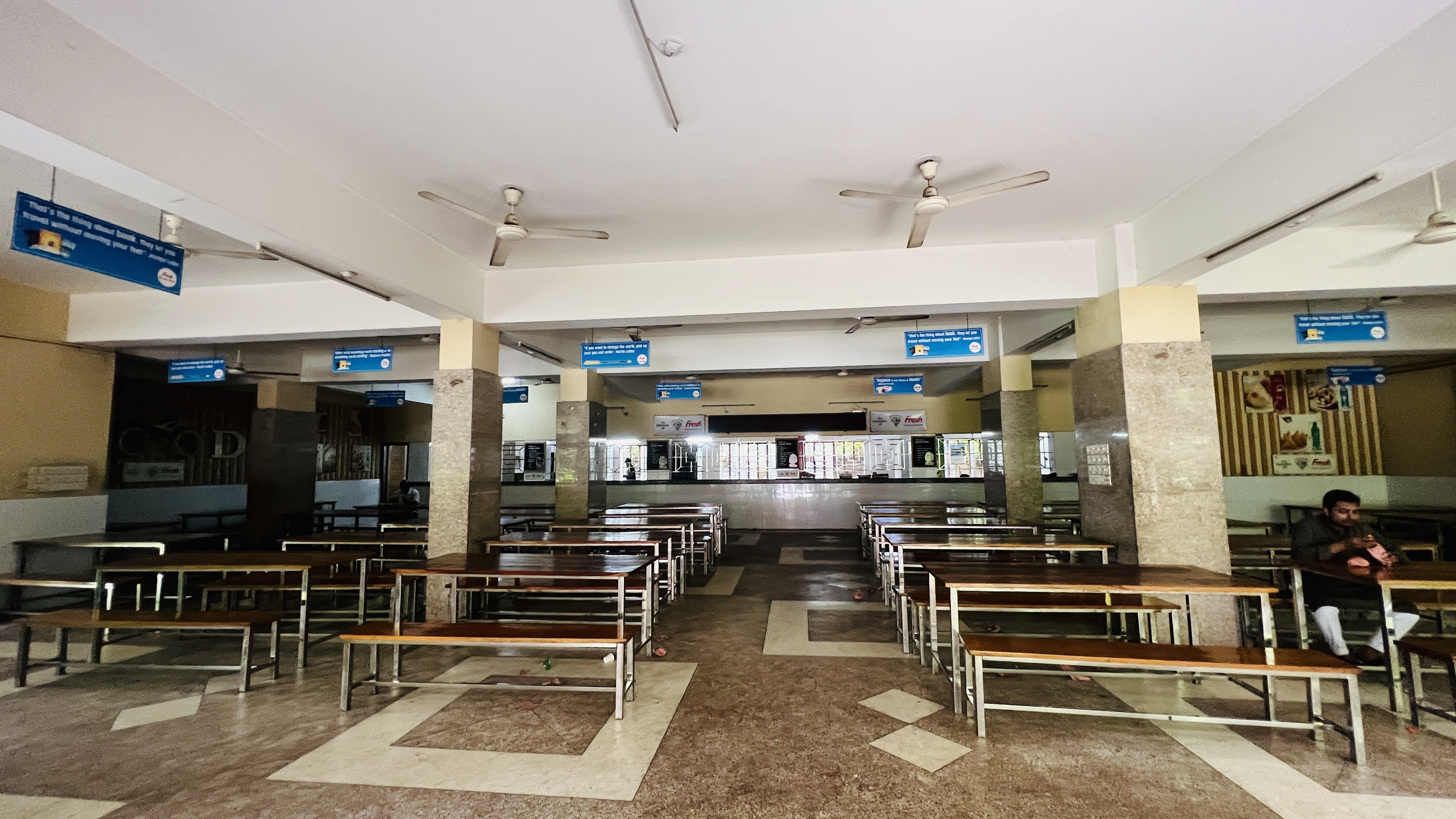
Notre Dame College canteen

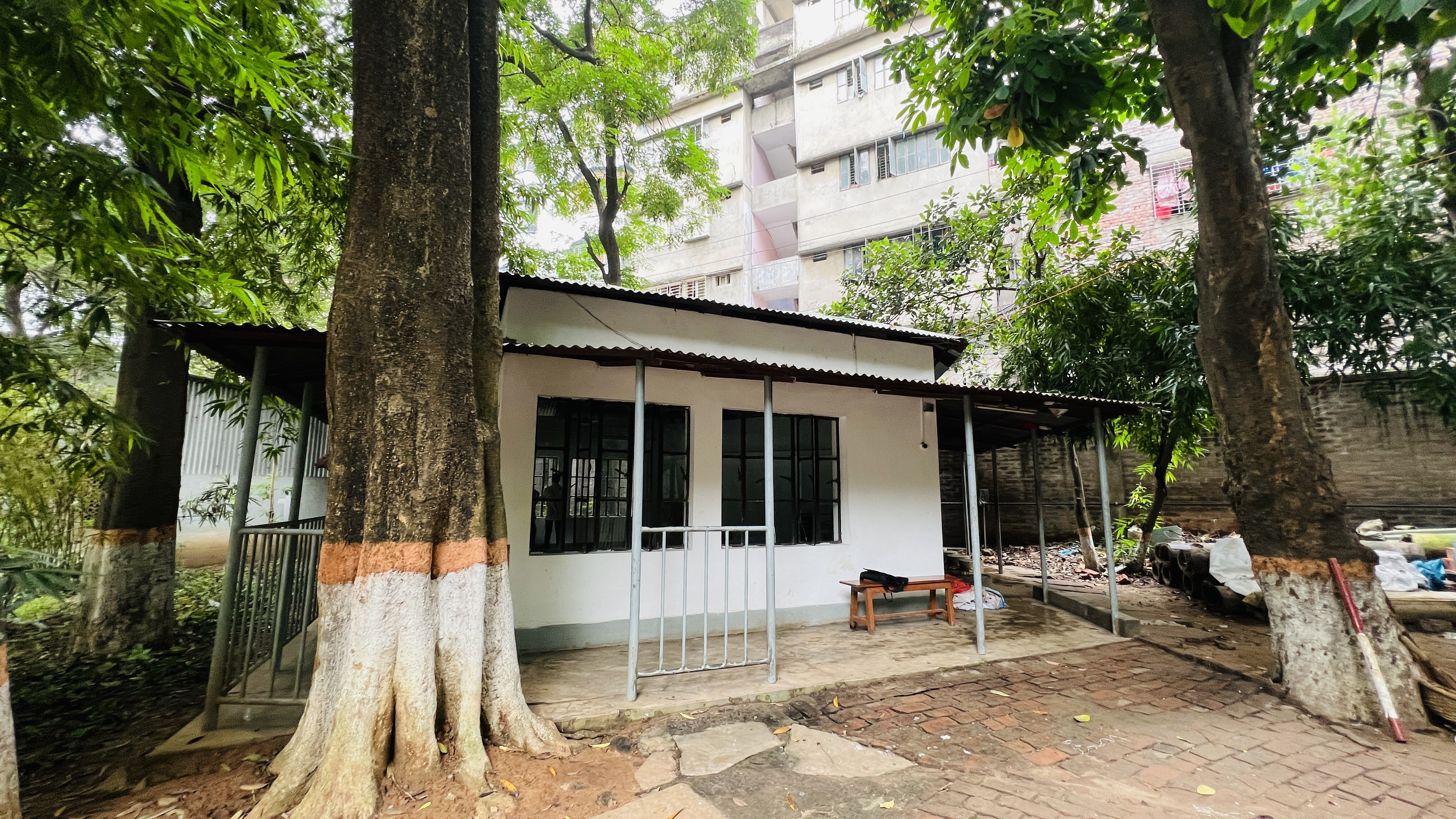
Notre Dame College Masjid

During the academic year 1952–53, Notre Dame College received Dhaka University's approval to commence BA classes. Subsequently, in the academic year 1953–54, Principal Richard William Timm inaugurated the college's first science department, conducting practical sessions within a tin room adjacent to the main building. Notably, on 18 September 1954, Richard William Timm established the subcontinent's pioneering non-formal institution dedicated to the pursuit of science, named the "Notre Dame Science Club." During the same period, the inaugural college weekly "Chit-Chat" (Note: The weekly publication later became a quarterly publication called Dhak-Dhol and Chit-Chat.) and the annual "Blue and Gold" (Note: The institutional colours of the University of Notre Dame are blue and gold.) were launched. Concurrently, clubs such as the "Notre Dame Photography Club" and the "Literary Guild" were established. In 1954, the college's relocation from Laxmibazar to Arambagh led to its renaming as the "Notre Dame College". Initially, the college offered courses in Arts and Commerce, later introducing BA courses in 1955. Subsequently, in 1959, it garnered recognition as the premier college in examinations held by various universities in East Pakistan.

The inclusion of a BSc course occurred in 1960. In response to a faculty shortage that year, volunteers affiliated with the British Volunteer Service Overseas served at Notre Dame College from 1963 to 1970. Following the completion of the new building in 1960, Principal James L. Martin succumbed to typhoid at Dhaka's Holy Family Hospital on 21 March. In his honor, the newly constructed building was christened "Father Martin Hall". Theotonius Amal Ganguly succeeded James Martin as the first Bengali principal. (Note: Preceding this, he ascended to assistant director of Studies on 26 October 1956, and subsequently assumed the role of Director of studies on 8 January 1957. Shortly after assuming the directorship, he resigned due to an accident, resuming duties on 8 January the next year. On 1 November of the same year, he was appointed acting vice-principal and acting assistant house superior. By the 14th of that month, he was designated as the college's discipline prefect. Upon the imminent return of Principal James Martin to the US in early 1959, Amal Ganguly was appointed vice-principal on 29 March. Around 1960, Ganguly led a course on ethics for high school science students. He assumed the role of acting principal as Principal Martin was admitted to Holy Family Hospital with severe illness and subsequently took over official duties on 30 August following Martin's passing, entrusted by the college's governing body.) However, after seven months in this role, he ascended to the position of assistant bishop of Archdiocese of Dhaka, eventually becoming the first Bengali bishop and archbishop of Dhaka.

=== Liberation War and ensuing history ===
Notre Dame College faced disruptions in its teaching activities due to political turmoil, notably the 1968–69 mass uprising. Amid the 1971 liberation war, Richard William Timm served as the college's principal. Despite government directives for normal operations during the conflict, like other institutions, Notre Dame College closed due to student absence. Additionally, the B.Sc course, inaugurated in 1960, was halted. In the war's final weeks, the institution's premises served as a Red Cross-UN safe haven, sheltering 44 UN officials. On 14 December 1971, two young doctors from Dhaka Medical College Hospital, Azharul Haque and Humayun Kabir, were abducted from their homes by Al-Badr forces, mercilessly tortured, and their dead bodies were found near Notre Dame College. From 1954 to 1971, I.Com was discontinued in the college, only to be resumed later. By the academic year 1972–73, BCom courses replaced the full-time BSc courses.

Following the War of Independence, Principal Richard William Timm left his teaching role, engaging actively in the nation's reconstruction efforts. He contributed significantly to the country's relief and rehabilitation and championed human rights initiatives through non-governmental development organizations. Concurrently, students from Notre Dame College, accompanied by teachers, ventured to remote regions in support of relief and rehabilitation endeavours on behalf of the institution.

In 1973, a devastating flood struck Bangladesh, leading to the closure of the college. The institution's workforce was dedicated to relief efforts. Under Principal Richard Timm's leadership, the "CORR" (Note: After the independence of Bangladesh, it was re-registered under the Societies Registration Act, 1860 in 1972. It was renamed as Caritas Bangladesh in 1976. On, 22 April 1981, Caritas got registered under the NGO Affairs Bureau of Bangladesh.) relief and rehabilitation organization was established. Daily meals were provided for approximately 1,500 individuals. During the subsequent flood and famine in 1974, the college administration continued aiding the government in managing the crisis. Principal Richard William Timm received the Magsaysay Award in 1987, honouring his outstanding service.

In 1974, upon the Bangladesh government's mandate, Bengali became compulsory for education in schools and colleges, marking its inclusion in the curriculum at Notre Dame College. This shift notably facilitated learning for many. Concurrently, James T. Benas, an English department faculty member, initiated an English language course to foster English proficiency as a second language. Initially exclusive to teachers, the course expanded to encompass students who appeared in the SSC examination. Commencing in 1974, the course remains ongoing, presently conducted by the college's English department faculty. In 1992, the college became affiliated with the National University, and in 1997, English was reinstated as the medium of instruction.

== Exposition ==
=== Nomenclature and principle ===
'Notre Dame' originates from the French words Notre-Dame, translated in English as 'Our Lady.' Roman Catholics associate Notre Dame with Mary, the mother of Jesus, hence the naming of the Catholic-run college after her.

=== Emblem and philosophy ===
At the apex of Notre Dame College's emblem rests an open book, displaying the Greek letters Alpha (Α) on the left page and Omega (Ω) on the right. These symbols denote the beginning and end of the Greek alphabet, symbolizing the entirety of wisdom. This imagery echoes a biblical phrase ascribed to Jesus in the Book of Revelation. Furthermore, books serve as vessels of knowledge. Together, these symbols convey a profound message: Within this book resides the accumulation of ages past, and through its attainment, enlightenment shall grace life.

At the base of the emblem lie three sections. On the left, seven Lotus flowers grace the compartment. The lotus, symbolizing purity, embodies the seven sorrows of Mary's life, designating her as the "Mother of Seven Sorrows" commemorating the tragic events. It signifies the pursuit of enlightenment amidst hardship. The adjacent right field portrays a flowing river, traversing boat, golden paddy fields, and vast blue-green vistas, encapsulating the college's location in the heart of lush Bangladesh. In the lower segment, a crucifix emanates from two intersecting anchors, denoting the emblem of the Congregation of Holy Cross. Embodied within: Just as Jesus' crucifixion brought salvation to humanity, salvation is attainable by anchoring oneself to the crucified Jesus, symbolized by the cross and anchors. The radiance emanating from the cross symbolizes the enlightenment and magnificence of Jesus Christ.

The College authorities have established a defined philosophy and mission. The motto encapsulating this philosophy reads, "Notre Dame College Students: Dedicated, Creative, Skilled, and Responsible." The institutional philosophy is as follows:

"The mission of Notre Dame College education is to foster the holistic development of individuals—nurturing self-motivation, creativity, a service-oriented mindset, engagement, and proficiency in acquiring and applying knowledge. It aims to cultivate responsibility in facing the challenges of the times."

== Gallery ==
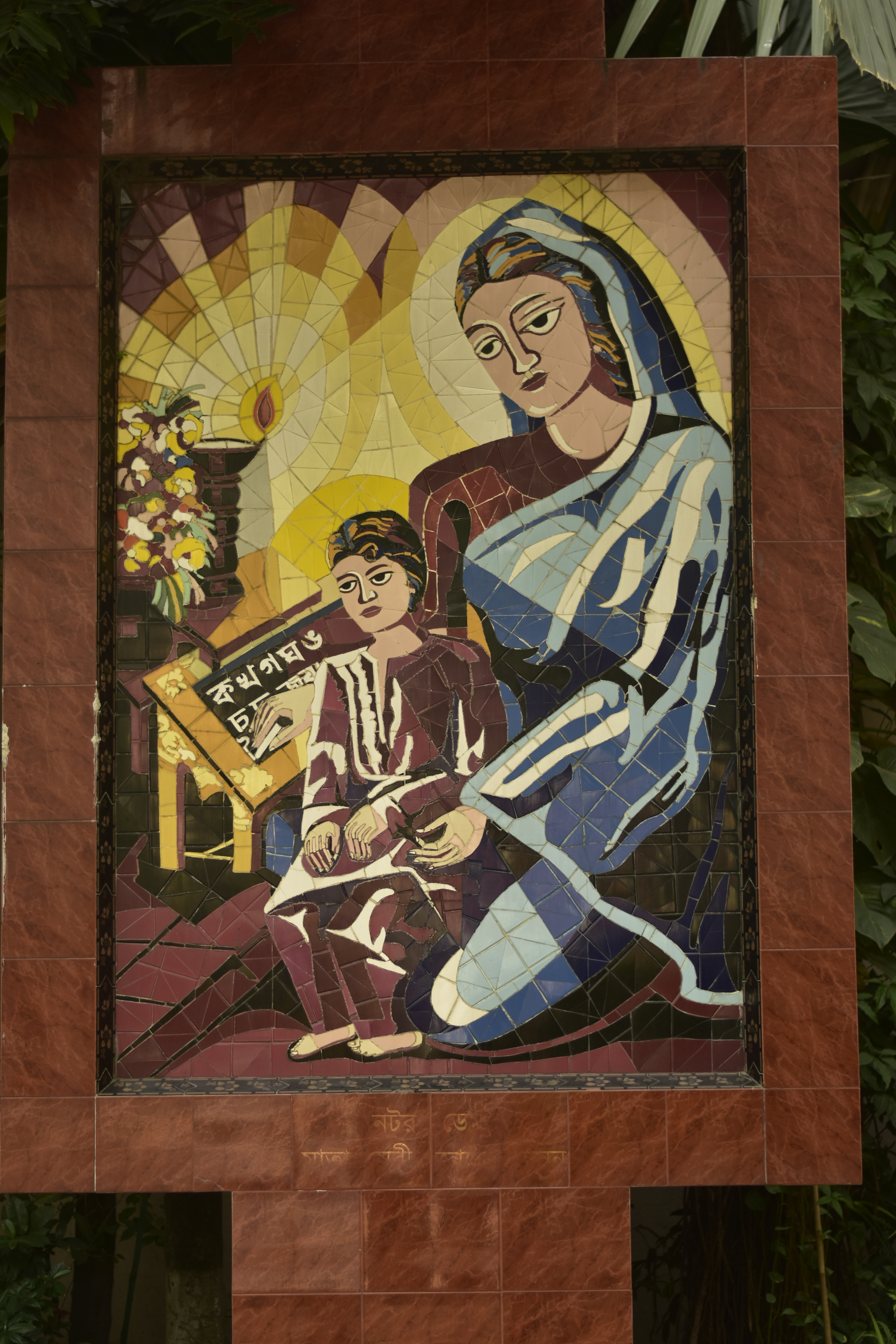
Mother Mary portrait

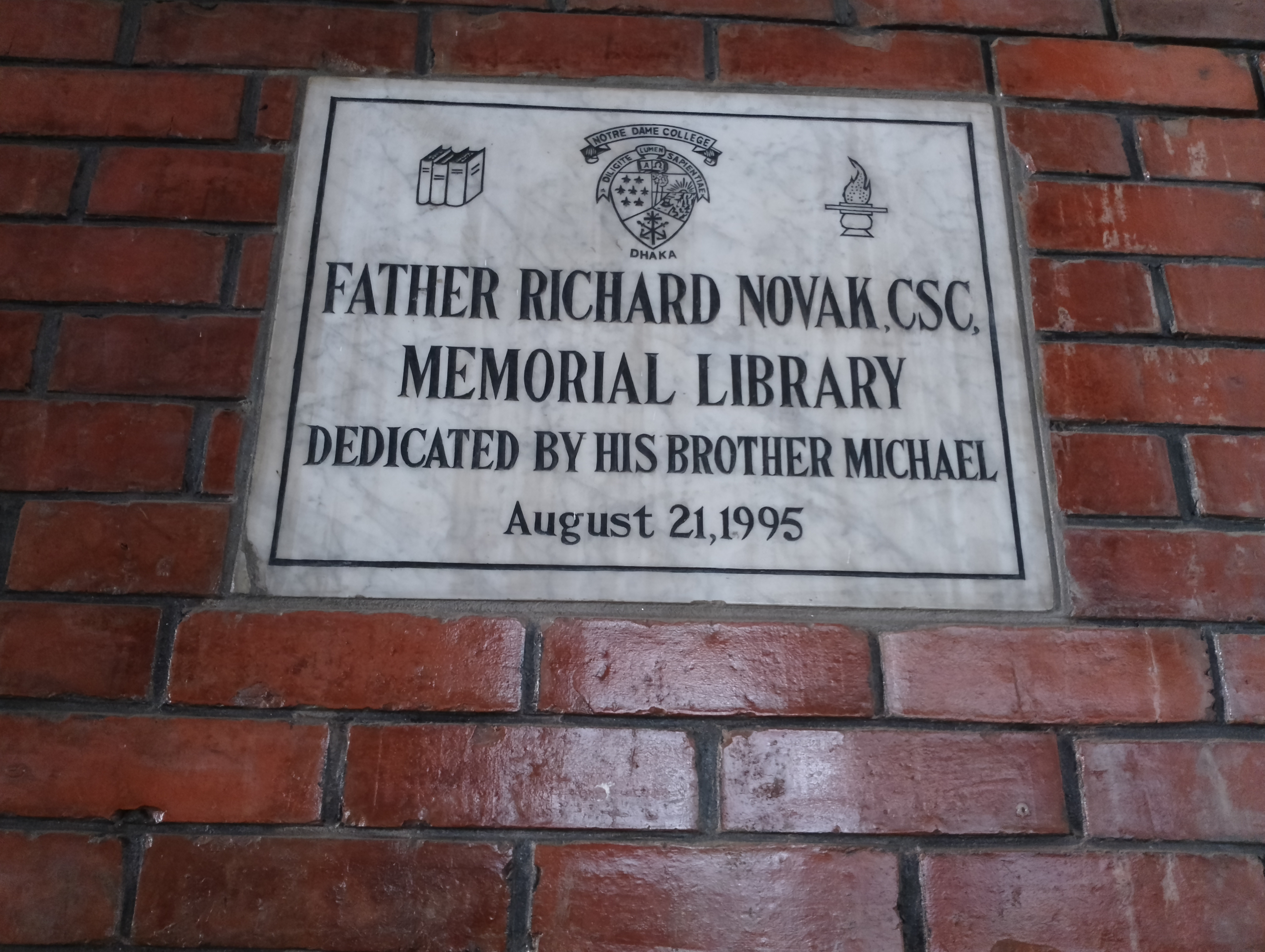
Fr. Richard Novak Library

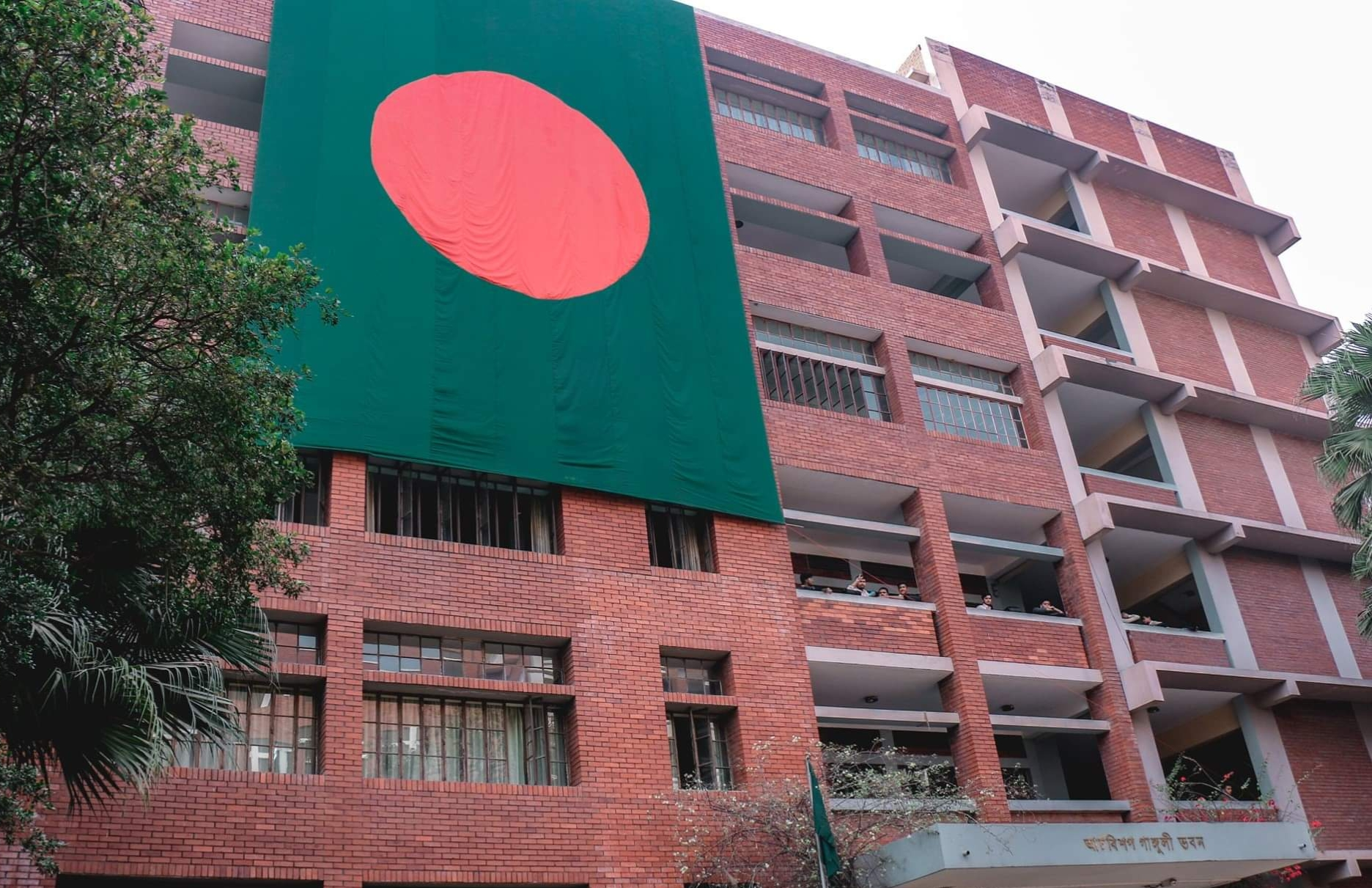
Ganguly Building

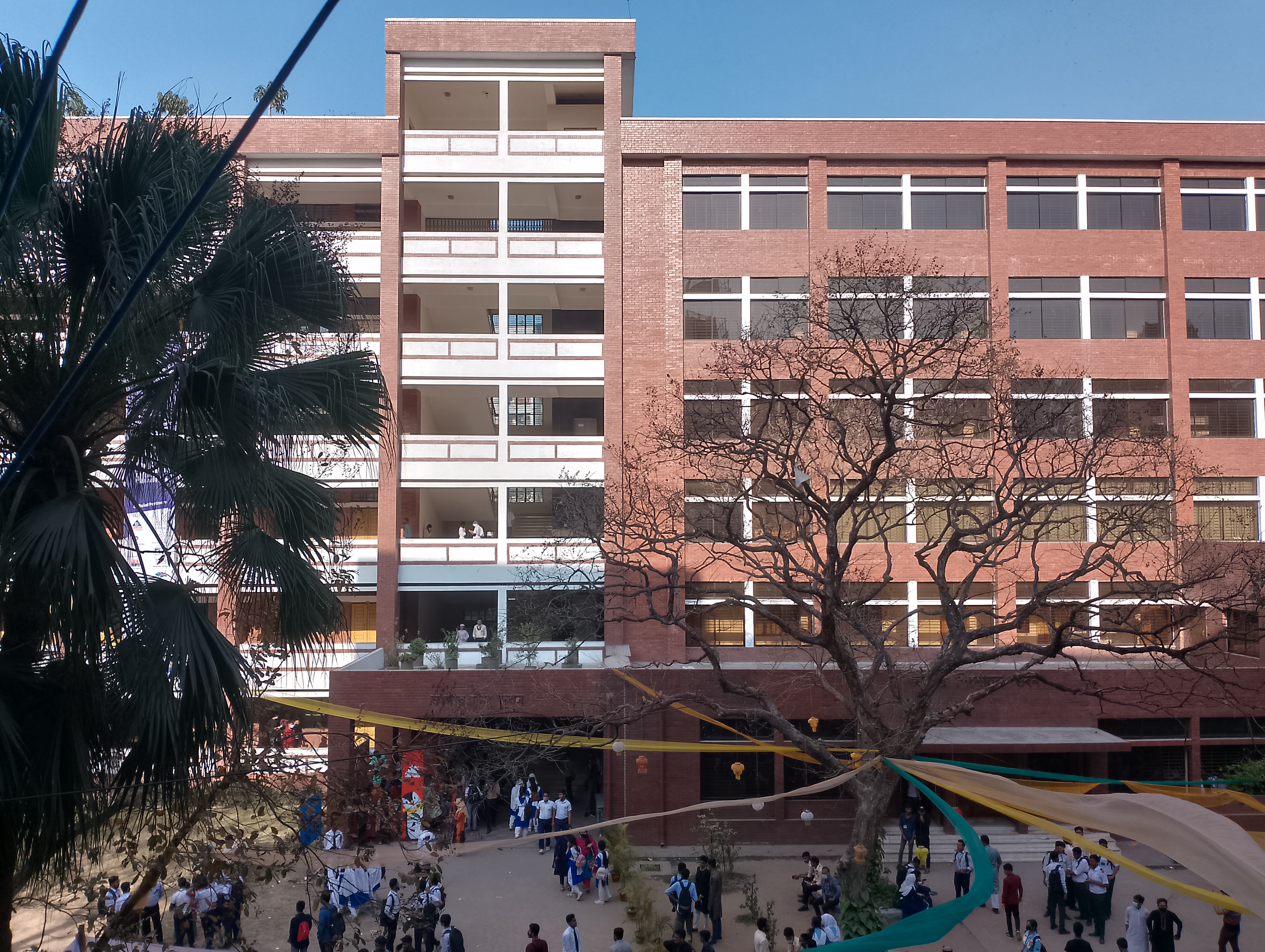
Fr. Timm & Fr. Peixotto Bhaban

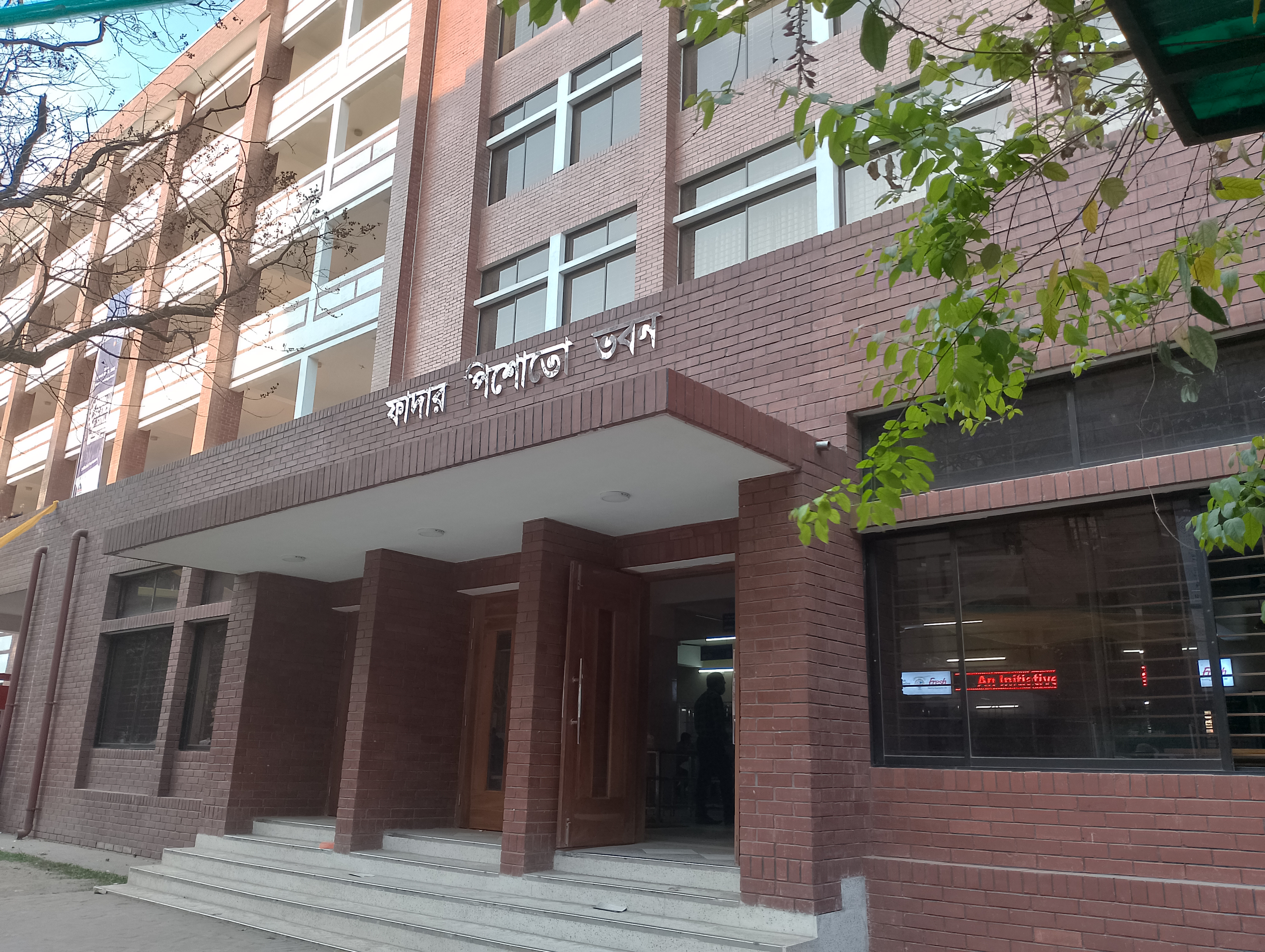
Father Peixotto Bhaban (2022)

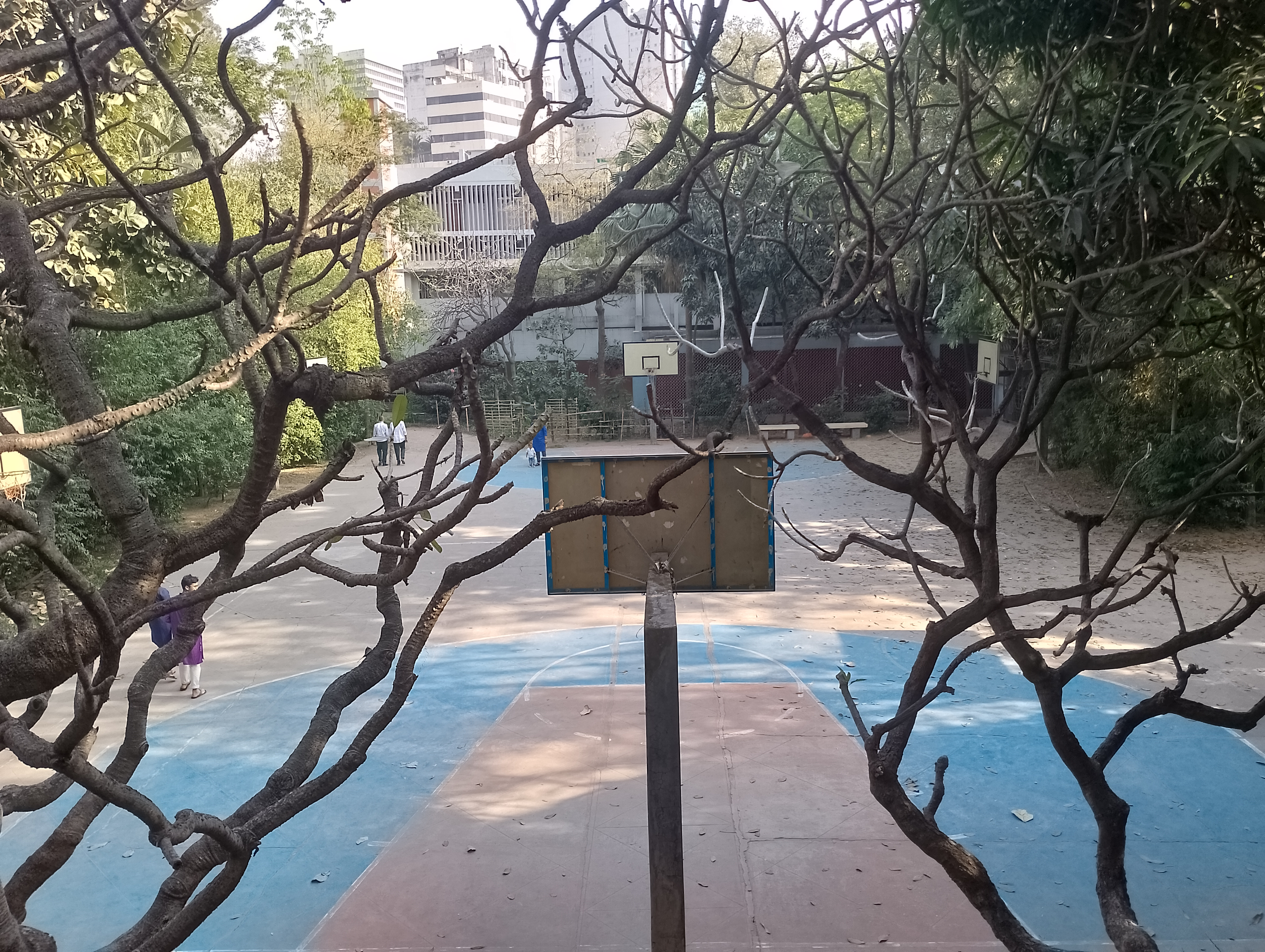
Old basketball ground (2023)

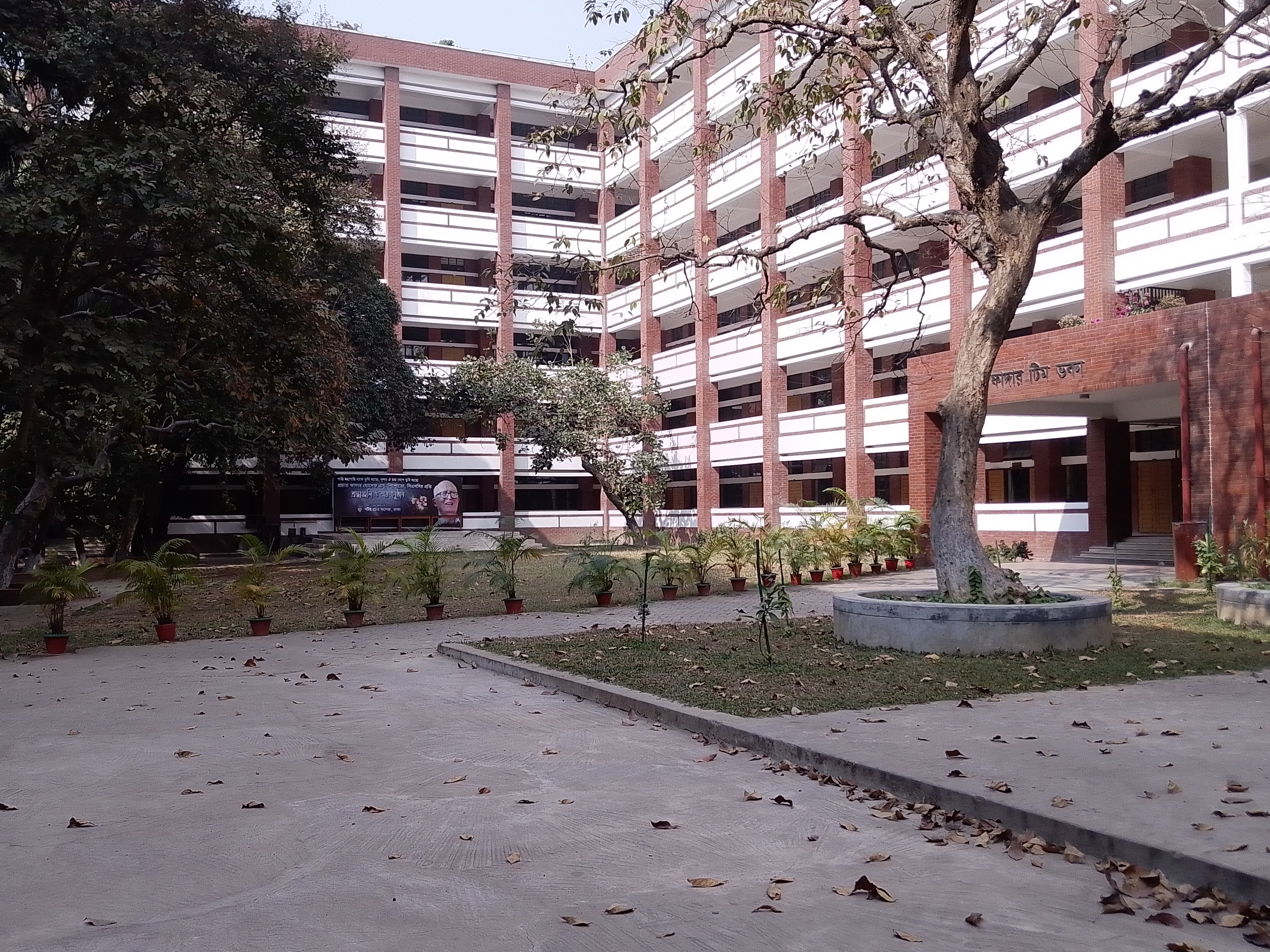
Father Richard Timm Building

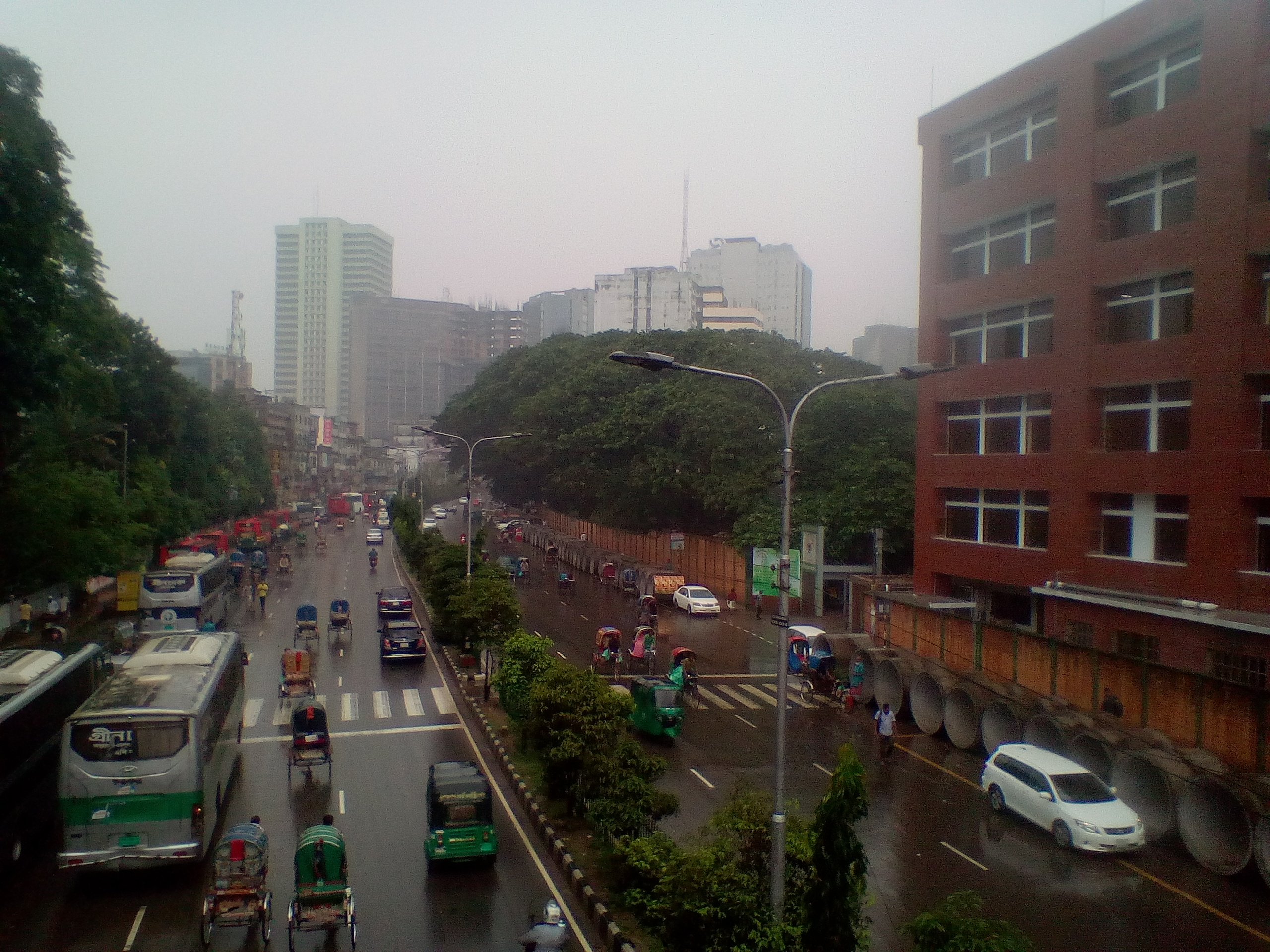
The road in front of the college on a rainy day

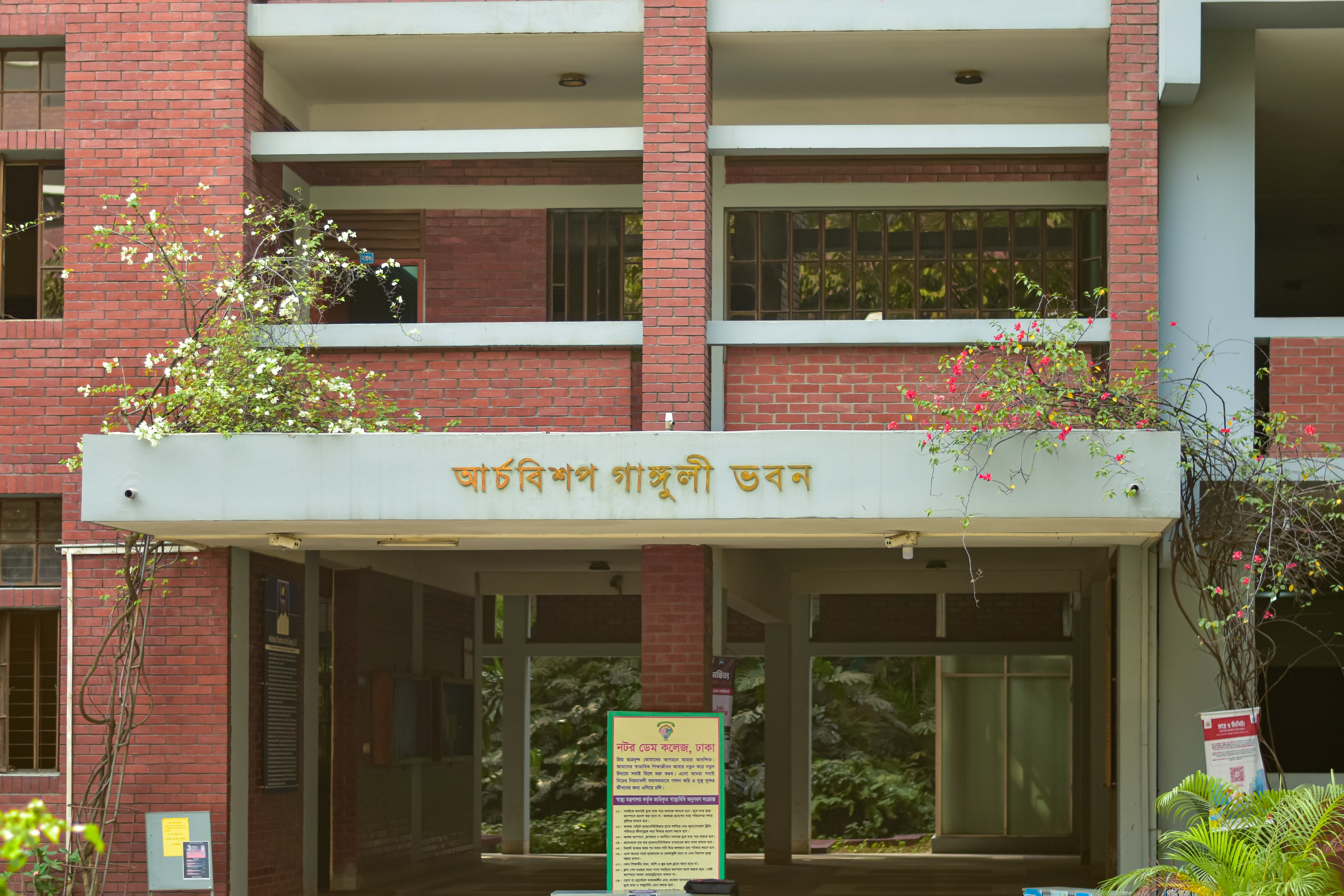
Archbishop Ganguly Building

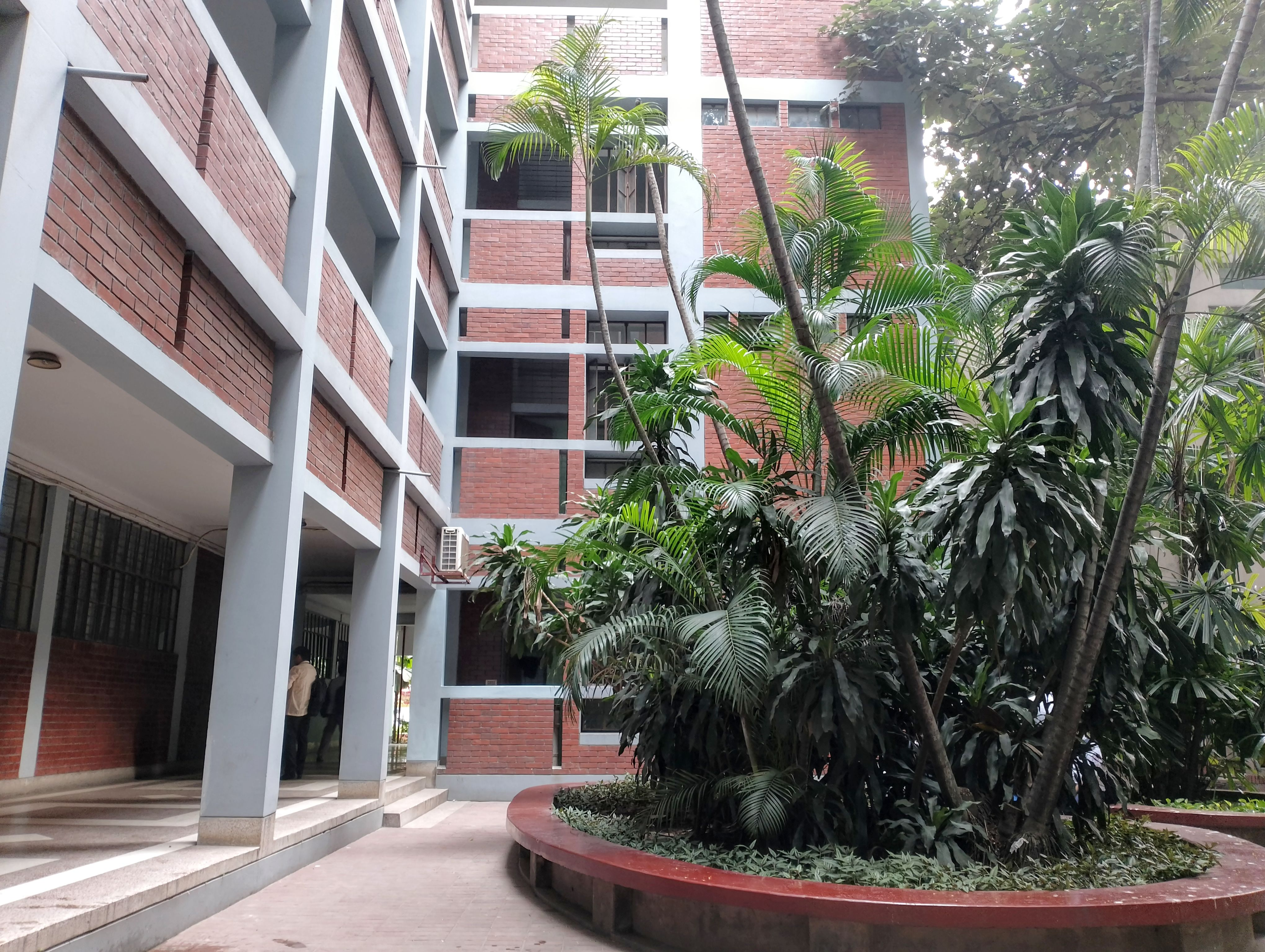
Ganguly Bhaban

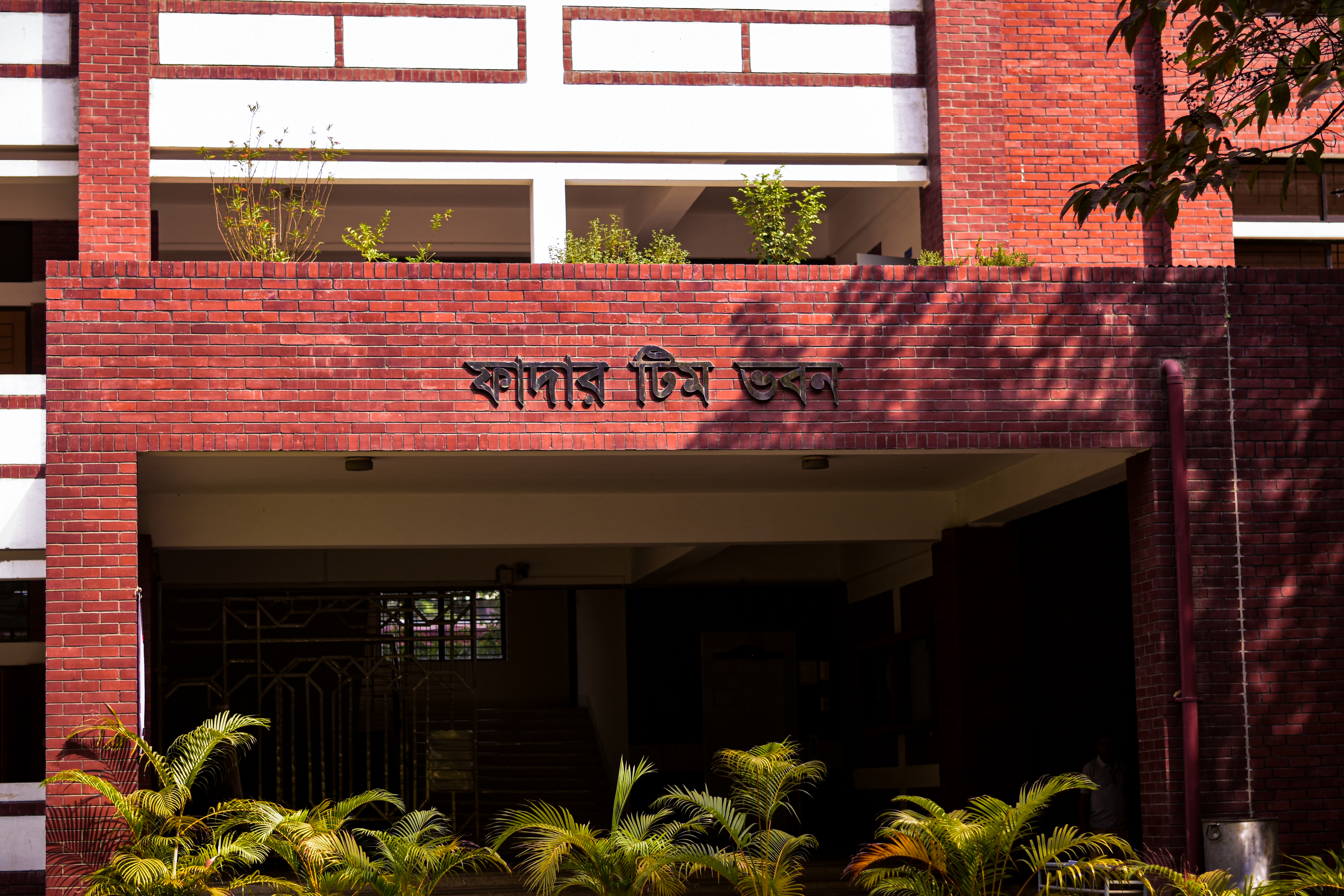
Entrance of Fr. Timm Building

== Architect ==
Robert G. Boughey is an American architect born in Pennsylvania, United States. He completed his Bachelor of Architecture from Pratt Institute, Brooklyn, New York in 1959, and received a diploma in tropical studies from AA School of Architecture, London, in 1967. He is a former research professor of architecture at Pratt Institute. He is the architect of the main structure of Notre Dame College.

== Students ==
Students of Notre Dame College are known as "Notredamians". Every year Notre Dame College admits around 2000–2100 students in science, around 410 students in humanities, and around 750 students in business studies through one of the most competitive college admission processes in the country.

Currently, it consists of 17 sections for students in science, terming each as "Groups". In the case of science, groups 1 to 14 include Bangla medium students, and the rest, groups 15, 16, and 17, admit English version students. Humanities has groups H, W, L, and G, while business studies has groups A, B, C, D, E, and F.

== Extracurricular clubs ==
The college has 26 extracurricular clubs.

=== Notre Dame Science Club ===
Notre Dame Science Club, also known as NDSC, is the oldest science club in the country. It was established on 18 September 1955 by the ex-principal of the college Father Richard William Timm, CSC. It celebrated its Golden Jubilee in 2005.

=== Notre Dame Nature Study Club ===
Notre Dame Nature Study Club, also known as NDNSC, is the first nature club in the country. It was established on 29 August 1984 by Mizanur Rahman Bhuiyan, former lecturer of Notre Dame College, and the founder and chairman of the Nature Study Society of Bangladesh.

=== Notre Dame Rotaract Club ===
Notre Dame Rotaract Club (NDRC) is the first Rotaract club at the college level in Bangladesh. The club was founded in 1990.

=== Notre Dame International Peace and Harmony Club ===
Notre Dame International Peace and Harmony Club (NDIPHC) is one of the oldest international relations clubs in the country and the first international relations club at high school/college level. It was established on 20 February 1992 as Notre Dame International Understanding and Relations Club(NDIURC).

It works with prestigious establishments such as Ministry of Foreign Affairs, Bangladesh, and Save the Children; embassies of Germany, Philippines, Sweden, Denmark and Norway. It also works along with international communities like the American Center Dhaka, British Council, etc. This club arranged the first-ever Mock Model UN in Notre Dame College and also arranged the first Model UN of Notre Dame College, titled Notre Dame College Model United Nations in 2017, since then it has been the foremost prestigious Model United Nations Conference in Bangladesh. The latest season of NDCMUN took place with more than 500 participants, making it one of the largest MUNs in the country. It stood out as the first Model United Nations Conference in Bangladesh hosted with the Ministry of Foreign Affairs as partners.

The club hosts the Sagacity and Quorum events as well along with maintaining a website. Rita Josephine Rozario of the English Department moderated the club for the longest period, before the current moderator, Md Azizur Rahman. Lecturer of the Math Department, stepped in.

=== Notre Dame Abritti Dal ===
The first college-level recitation organization in the subcontinent, Notre Dame Abritti Dal, was founded on 18 August 1992, under the leadership of Marlin Clara Penheiro, head of the Bengali Department and assistant professor of Notre Dame College. The club, with the motto "বাক্‌শিল্পকে সমৃদ্ধ কর" meaning "Enrich the art of speech," has been representing Notre Dame College and promoting art and culture for more than 30 years.

=== Notre Dame Writer's Club ===
This club was founded on 29 July 2001. The motto of this club is 'অক্ষরে আঁকি সৃষ্টির সৌন্দর্য' or 'Depicting the beauty of creation in letters'. Dr. Mizanur Rahman is the current moderator of this club. It arranges workshops on creative writing, book publishing, and journalism. Story writing, handwriting, and quiz competitions are arranged regularly as well. Members of this club usually edit 'Dhak-Dhol Chit-Chat,' the quarterly publication of Notre Dame College, Dhaka.

=== Notre Dame Math Club ===
Notre Dame Math Club was established on 14 March 2017 (Pi Day). The Club regularly organizes seminars, workshops, and tutorial classes for students interested in mathematics. It also helps weak students develop skills in mathematics. The club is known for the unique nomenclature system it uses for its moderator, executives, and members, naming them after various mathematical terms like Definition, Axiom, Hypothesis, Operator, Proof, Relation, Coefficient etc.

Apart from regular programs, the club also organizes the annual inter-school/inter-college program called the NDC National Math Festival. During this festival various mathematical competitions are held among school and college-level students from multiple institutions. The club annually publishes a handwritten scrap magazine called The Number on Pi Day. On Pi Day 2018, the club published its first printed annual magazine called The Function. On March 12, 2026, the club extended its publication range nationwise by publishing The Set. a massive editorial compilation of math articles ever published by the club. Md. Rezaul Karim, a lecturer of the Mathematics Dept., is serving the club as the honorable moderator, namely the Axiom.

=== Notre Dame Photography Club ===
Notre Dame Photography Club was established on 9 August 2017. Md. Moin Uddin Ahasan Habib, lecturer of the Zoology of Biology Dept. is serving as the hon. moderator of this club.

=== Notre Dame Information Technology Club ===
Notre Dame Information Technology Club (NDITC) was founded on 27 June 2018.

The activities of the club include Competitive programming, Graphics design, Content Writing, Robotics, Video Editing, etc. The club regularly arranges various competitions among and beyond the students of the college. CodeCompass is the official monthly newsletter of the club.

The club is currently moderated by Ajimun Haque, lecturer of ICT.

=== Notre Dame Media and Communication Club ===
Founded in 2022, Mrs. Shapla Banik is serving as the Hon. Moderator of the club.

=== Notre Dame Yoga and Meditation Club ===
Merging finitude into infinity with Swapan Halder, lecturer of English, serving as the Hon. Moderator of Notre Dame Yoga and Meditation Club.

=== Juba Red Crescent Club, Notre Dame College ===
International Red Cross Red Crescent Society has been working in the world through volunteering since its opening.

== Publications ==
Blue and Gold is the yearbook of Notre Dame College. Notre Dame College publishes students' quarterly magazine Dhak Dhol – Chit Chat. Each club has its own yearly magazine/publication. Among them AUDRI of Notre Dame Science Club is the most famous. Nishorga, the annual magazine of Notre Dame Nature Study Club is also worth mentioning. The Number, a handwritten yearly magazine with a hand-drawn cover featuring math articles by the members of the Notre Dame Math Club, is one of the most unique publications the college has.

Notre Dame International Understanding and Relation Club (NDIURC) also publishes its own annual magazine titled Jogajog with a couple thousand circulations. For the last few years, Notre Dame Natya Dal has been publishing Mancha, a magazine that depicts its activities and theater.

Notre Dame Math Club publishes a hand-designed scrap magazine called The Number, and the annual magazine called The Function on Pi Day. Notre Dame Information and Technology Club publishes its own magazine called Recursion which is given to the winners of various events of NIDTC's Annual Fest and its club members and well-wishers.

== Organization and administration ==
The college is managed by Christian priests of the Congregation of Holy Cross in Dhaka. The head of the college management committee is always the archbishop of Dhaka, currently His Grace The Most Reverend Bejoy Nicephorus D'Cruze.

Since its establishment, ten priests have served as the principal of the college.

- John J. Harrington (1949–1954)
- James L. Martin (1954–1960)
- Theotonius Amal Ganguly (March 1960 – October 1960)
- William Graham (1960–1967)
- John Vanden Bossche (1967–1969)
- Joseph S. Peixotto (1969–1970)
- Richard Timm (1970–1971)
- Ambrose Wheeler (1971–1976)
- Joseph S. Peixotto (1976–1998)
- Benjamin Costa (1998–2012)
- Fr. Hemanto Pius Rozario (2012–present)

Among them, Father Timm was a renowned biologist and a winner of the 1987 Ramon Magsaysay award for International Understanding. He was also the founder-moderator of Notre Dame Science Club and Notre Dame Debating Club.

== See also ==
- St. Joseph Higher Secondary School
- Holy Cross College, Dhaka
- List of colleges in Bangladesh
- Education in Bangladesh
