= Ethmolaimidae =

Scientific classification
- Domain: Eukaryota
- Kingdom: Animalia
- Phylum: Nematoda
- Class: Chromadorea
- Order: Chromadorida
- Family: Ethmolaimidae

Synonyms
- Spilipheridae

Family of roundworms

Ethmolaimidae is a family of nematodes belonging to the order Chromadorida.

Genera:

- Ethmodora Khera, 1975
- Paraethmolaimus Jensen, 1994
- Trichethmolaimus Platt, 1982
