= Achromadoridae =

Scientific classification
- Kingdom: Animalia
- Phylum: Nematoda
- Class: Chromadorea
- Order: Chromadorida
- Family: Achromadoridae

Family of worms

Achromadoridae is a family of nematodes belonging to the order Chromadorida.

Genera:

- Achromadora Cobb, 1913
- Paradoxolaimus Kreis, 1924
- Kreisonema Khera, 1969
