= Caritas Pakistan =

Catholic charity organisation in Pakistan

- Established: 1965
- Type: Nonprofit
- Headquarters: 23/3 Race Course Road
- Location: Lahore, Pakistan
- Coordinates: 31.54511°N 74.32942°E
- Origins: Catholic Social Teaching
- Region served: Pakistan
- Fields: social work, development aid, humanitarian aid
- Affiliations: Caritas Asia, Caritas Internationalis
- Website: caritas.org.pk

Caritas Pakistan opened in 1965 and has many years of humanitarian assistance history in Pakistan. It is affiliated with Caritas Internationalis, a Roman Catholic humanitarian organisation and one of the largest networks dedicated to reducing poverty and injustice in the world.

== History ==
Caritas Pakistan was established in 1965. An eastern branch, known then as Caritas East Pakistan, was opened in 1967 and covered what is now Bangladesh.

=== Asian tsunami ===
On January 12, 2005, four doctors from Caritas Lahore left for Sri Lanka to assist survivors of the Asian tsunami. The doctors took medicines and US$8,448, which they handed over to Caritas Sri Lanka. The doctors planned to stay in Sri Lanka for two weeks.

=== 2005 earthquake ===
In 2005 Catholic school children in Pakistan showed great solidarity with earthquake victims in Kashmir. In Lahore pupils in Franciscan Schools organised school bazaars to collect funds for Kashmir. They collected 3,000 bottles of mineral water which Caritas distributed to people in affected areas. Christian school pupils provided Caritas with food, medicine and also funds for schooling since most schools collapsed in the quake. Catholic school teachers have contributed to the solidarity efforts giving one day's wage to the fund for earthquake victims. Many of the volunteers involved in assisting people in areas affected by the October 8 quake are Catholics operating with Caritas and other Christian humanitarian agencies.

A Caritas Pakistan team arrived the village of Balakot to assist patients at the Leprosy Centre completely destroyed in the earthquake. The team, brought food as well as medicines to patients entirely without access to nurses and doctors. Caritas provided medical assistance, calling in medical and nursing personnel from other parts of Pakistan and even from India. They put up a field hospital in North West Frontier Province and asked local people to lend a room for patient care. A Caritas team in Battagram village supplied medical equipment and medicine, walking 24 km on foot along mountain paths. Caritas personnel work with the Pakistan Army which provided logistical help and transport.

Caritas Pakistan continues to help earthquake-affected people by providing temporary shelters and warm clothes, but also focused their efforts on longer-term health and livelihood work, including the running of mobile health clinics, the rebuilding of three basic health units, kitchen garden training and seed and fertiliser distributions.

=== 2010 floods ===
In August 2010 the heaviest rains in 80 years caused the worst flooding the country has ever seen. Caritas will provide much-needed relief to 2,500 families in the Islamabad-Rawalpindi and Multan dioceses as well as Quetta vicariate.

=== 50th anniversary ===
In September 2015, hundreds of Pakistani Catholics gathered for a Mass of thanksgiving in Lahore, to celebrate the 50th anniversary of the foundation of Caritas Pakistan. Archbishop Joseph Coutts of Karachi, who is also chair of Caritas Pakistan, was the principal celebrant. Concelebrants included Archbishop Sebastian Francis Shaw of Lahore, Bishop Rufin Anthony of Islamabad-Rawalpindi, Bishop Joseph Arshad of Faisalabad, Bishop Benny Travas of Multan, and a number of priests.

== Other work ==
Caritas in Pakistan in 2007 opened the Multan Padre Pio Medical Centre to provide basic medical care to the underprivileged. The inauguration was performed by the Catholic Bishop of Multan, Bishop Andrew Francis. The centre will be open six days a week with male and female doctors on duty on alternate days.

On April 22, 2016, Archbishop Joseph Coutts launched the Caritas campaign "Trees for the Earth" at Saint Patrick's Cathedral, Karachi. In this campaign Caritas will plant 5,000 trees in church areas and other parts of the city to protect the environment.

In Karachi Caritas started the Livelihood program, an entrepreneurship project with the slogan "Empower Women, Empower Pakistan". Between November 2017 until February 2018 they trained 240 women and young girls in candle making, handicrafts, jewellery making, block printing, screen printing, foil work, cutting and stitching, dress design and fashion design.
