= Neotonchidae =

Scientific classification
- Domain: Eukaryota
- Kingdom: Animalia
- Phylum: Nematoda
- Class: Chromadorea
- Order: Chromadorida
- Family: Neotonchidae

Family of nematodes

Neotonchidae is a family of nematodes belonging to the order Chromadorida.

Genera:

- Comesa Gerlach, 1956
- Dystomanema Bezerra, Pape, Hauquier, Vanreusel & Ingels, 2013
- Filitonchoides Jensen, 1986
- Filitonchus Platt, 1982
- Gomphionchus Platt, 1982
- Neotonchoides Platt, 1982
