= South Asia Forum for Human Rights =

The South Asia Forum for Human Rights (SAFHR) is a South Asia-focused human rights organization based in Kathmandu whose mission is to "promote respect for universal standards of human rights with emphasis on universality and interdependence of human rights." They view human rights as interlinked with peace and democracy, and their broader program encompasses all these concerns. SAFHR aims to be a forum for dialog between regional human rights organizations and activists.

SAFHR was created in 1990 as an outcome of the December 1990 Third World Congress on Human Rights in New Delhi. At this congress representatives from over fifty NGO's recognized the need for a regional perspective on South Asian human rights issues. The South Asian Association for Regional Cooperation (SAARC) had been created in 1985 for similar purposes, but SAARC was an intra-government organization, and had not focused on human rights issues.

== Activities ==
SAFHR has a number of education programs, including a Peace Studies course and workshops on refuge and minority rights. They have a library of over a thousand books focusing on South Asian issues available to researchers.

SAFHR has published several books, including Reduced To Ashes: The Insurgency and Human Rights in Punjab. SAFHR staff write focused reports and working papers on various topics, and issue topical E-Briefs. They were the publisher of Refugee Watch from 1998 through 2004.

== Partners and Associates ==
The Council of SAFHR consists of representatives of roughly 40 partner organizations.

South Asian Region:

- Pakistan Human Rights Commission (Lahore)
- Pakistan Institute of Labour Education and Research
- Pakistan Peace Coalition (Karachi)
- Pakistan-India Peoples Forum for Peace and Democracy
- National Peace Council (Colombo)
- Consortium of Humanitarian Agencies (Colombo)
- International Centre for Ethnic Studies (Colombo)
- Informal Sector Service Centre (Kathmandu)
- Him-Rights (Kathmandu)
- Human Rights Organisation (Kathmandu)
- The Other Media (New Delhi)
- South Asia Human Rights Documentation Centre (New Delhi)
- Campaign Committee of Indigenous Peoples (New Delhi)
- Peoples' Watch Tamil Nadu (Madurai)
- Naga People's Movement for Human Rights (Kohima, India)
- Committee for Initiative on Kashmir (New Delhi)
- ODHIKAR (Dhaka)
- Ain-O-Salish Kendra (Dhaka)
- Legal Aids Centre (Dhaka)
- Hotline Bangladesh (Dhaka)
- Mahanirban Calcutta Research Group (Calcutta)
- Association of Human Rights Activists (Bhutan)
- Research and Development Collective (Bangladesh)
- Young Lawyers for Human Rights (Kathmandu)
- DrukYul Mimang Mangtsoi Tshokpa
- Forum for Protection of Human Rights (Kathmandu)
- Human Rights Organisation of Bhutan
- Jammu & Kashmir Federation of Civil Society Organisation
- Community Trust Fund (Colombo)
- Indian Centre for Human Rights & Law (Mumbai)
- Naga Mothers' Association (Kohima, Nagaland)
- Naga Women's Union of Manipur (Imphal, Manipur)

International:

- Friedrich-Naumann-Stiftung (New Delhi)
- Forum on Early Warning and Early Response (London)
- Asian Human Rights Commission (Hong Kong)
- Asia Human Rights Alert Net
- Co-existence Initiative (New York)
- Network Harvard University-Women Waging Peace (Cambridge)
- Minority Rights Group International (London)
- CERAS (Montreal)

== See also ==
- Human rights in Asia
