= Caritas Bangladesh =

Catholic charitable organization

- কারিতাস বাংলাদেশ
- Predecessor: Caritas Pakistan
- Formation: 1967; 59 years ago (as Caritas East Pakistan)
- Type: Nonprofit, NGO
- Legal status: charity
- Purpose: Humanitarian aid, International development and social service
- Headquarters: 2, Outer Circular Road, Shantibagh
- Location: Dhaka, Bangladesh
- Region served: Bangladesh
- President: Most Reverend James Romen Boiragi
- Vice President: Reverend Father Gabriel Corraya
- Parent organization: Caritas Internationalis
- Website: www.caritasbd.org
- Formerly called: Christian Organisation for Relief and Rehabilitation (CORR)

Caritas Bangladesh (Bengali: কারিতাস বাংলাদেশ) is a Catholic charitable organization in Bangladesh. It is a member of Caritas Internationalis and governed by the Catholic Bishops' Conference of Bangladesh.

== History ==
Caritas Bangladesh was founded in 1967 as the eastern branch of Caritas Pakistan. After the 1970 Bhola cyclone, it was re-organised and renamed as Christian Organisation for Relief and Rehabilitation (CORR). It became a national organisation on January 13, 1971.

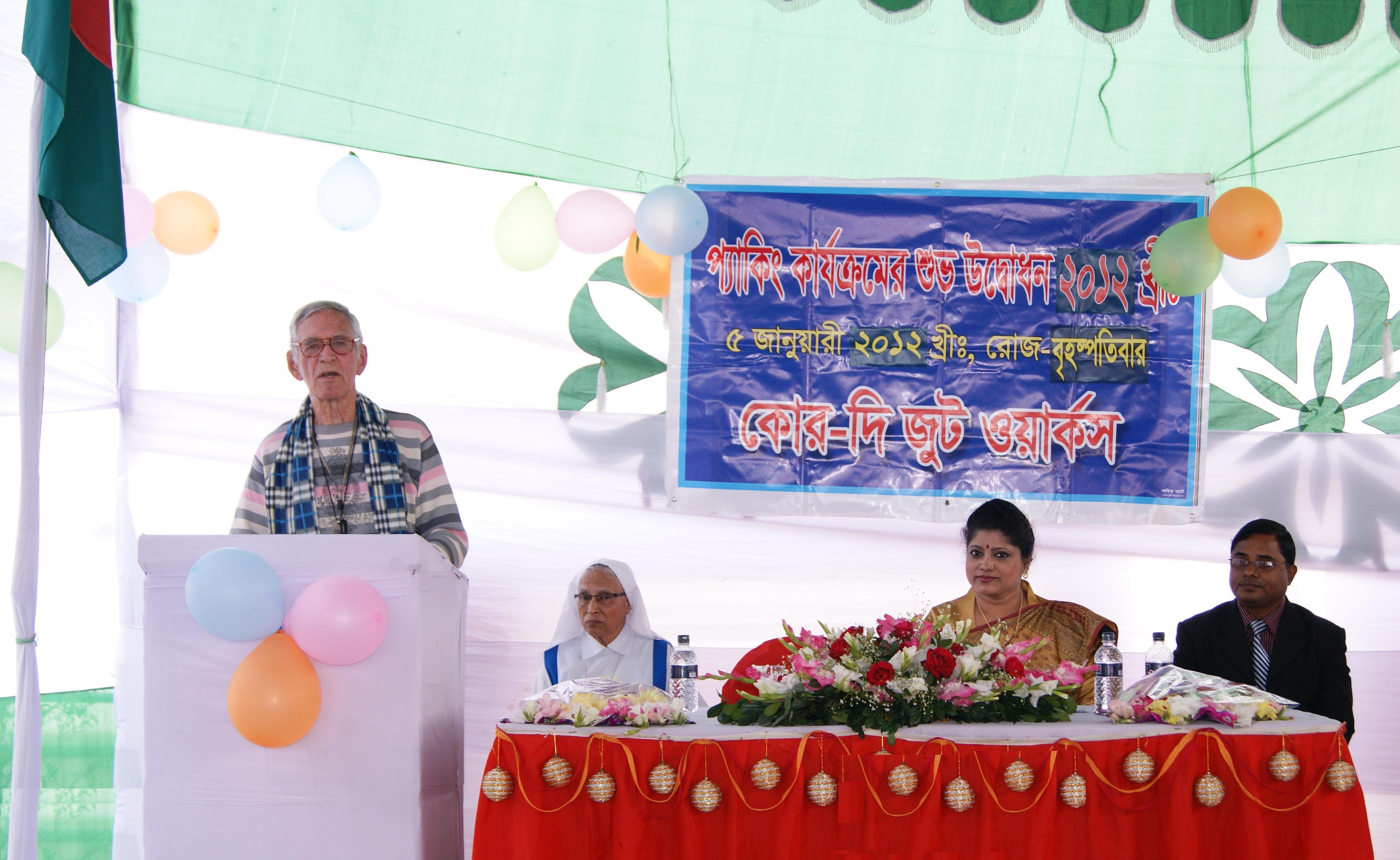
Richard W. Timm at the inaugurating ceremony of CORR–The Jute Works

After the independence of Bangladesh, it was re-registered under the Societies Registration Act, 1860 in 1972. It was renamed Caritas Bangladesh in 1976. On, April 22, 1981, Caritas was registered under the NGO Affairs Bureau of Bangladesh.

== Regional offices ==
The headquarters of Caritas Bangladesh is located at Shantibagh in Dhaka, and there are eight diocesan offices, located in Barishal, Chattogram, Dhaka, Dinajpur, Khulna, Mymensingh, Rajshahi and Sylhet.

== Trusts and projects ==
- Caritas Development Institute
- CORR–The Jute Works
- Mirpur Agriculture Workshop and Training Schools
- Bangladesh Rehabilitation and Assistance Center for Addicts (BARACA)

== Emergency responses ==
Caritas Bangladesh has responded to the Cyclone Amphan, Cyclone Bulbul, 2017 floods in Bangladesh, Cyclone Sidr, etc. It also continues to respond to ongoing national crises including the COVID-19 pandemic, and the Rohingya refugee crisis.
