= Carl Allgén =

Swedish zoologist (1886–1960)

- Born: Carl Algon Jönsson Allgén; 21 July 1886; Lund, Sweden
- Died: 19 August 1960 (aged 74); Malmö, Sweden
- Education: University of Lund
- Occupation: zoologist
- Known for: research of nematodes

Carl Algon Jönsson Allgén (21 July 1886, in Lund – 19 August 1960, in Malmö) was a Swedish zoologist, who specialized in morphological and systematic research of nematodes.

In 1912 he received his master's degree at Lund, then obtained his licentiate in 1918. He taught classes in biology in Jönköping (1920–40) and in biology and geography in Eslöv (1940–52). During his career, he took research trips to Austria, Germany and Switzerland (1922), to Norway (1928), to Heligoland (1922, 1936) and to the Middle East (1938).

His collections are deposited in the Swedish Museum of Natural History in Stockholm.

== Published works ==
- Südschwedische marine Nematoden, 1929 – Marine nematodes of southern Sweden
- Freilebende Marine Nematoden aus den Umgebungen der Staatlichen Zoologischen Station Kristineberg an der Westküste Schwedens, 1929 – Marine nematodes from the environs of the Kristineberg zoological station on the west coast of Sweden
- Freilebende nematoden aus dem Trondhjemsfjord, 1933 – Nematodes from Trondheimsfjord
- Über einige freilebende Nematoden, insbesondere aus der litoralen Region des Lofoten-Archipels, 1933 – On some nematodes, particularly from the littoral region of Lofoten archipelago
- Die arten und die systematische stellung der Phanodermatinae, einer unterfamilie der Enoplidae, 1934 – Species and the systematic status of Phanodermatinae, a subfamily of Enoplidae
- Die freilebenden Nematoden des Öresunds, 1935 – On nematodes from Øresund
- Weitere Beiträge zur Kenntnis der Nematoden-Fauna des südlichen Kattegatts, 1947 – More contributions in regards to nematodes of the southern Kattegat
- Freilebende marine Nematoden von der Insel Storfosen : ein weiterer Beitrag zur Kenntnis der Strandnematoden-Fauna Norwegens, 1950 – Marine nematodes of Storfosna, another contribution in regards to littoral nematode fauna of Norway
- "Pacific freeliving marine nematodes", 1951
- "Freeliving marine nematodes from east Greenland and Jan Mayen", 1954
- "On a small collection of freeliving marine nematodes from Greenland and some other Arctic regions", 1957
- "Freeliving marine nematodes", 1959.
