= Reduced to Ashes (book) =

Book by Ram Narayan Kumar

Reduced To Ashes: The Insurgency and Human Rights in Punjab
- Cover page.
- Author: Ram Narayan Kumar, Amreek Singh Muktsar, Ashok Agrwaal, Jaskaran Kaur
- Cover artist: SIMRIK
- Language: English
- Genre: research
- Publisher: RETHINK BOOKS
- Publication date: June, 6, 2023
- Publication place: INDIA
- Media type: Print [HARDCOVER]
- Pages: 634
- ISBN: 978-93-94737-86-0

Reduced To Ashes: The Insurgency and Human Rights in Punjab is the report of the Committee for Coordination on Disappearances in Punjab (CCDP), authored by Ram Narayan Kumar, Amreek Singh, Ashok Agrwaal and Jaskaran Kaur. The report focuses on human rights violations committed by the Punjab Police during its operations to suppress the Punjab insurgency in India, from 1984 to 1994. The author Ram Narayan Kumar claims that the issue of Khalistan was used by the State to divert attention from real issues of democracy, constitutional safeguard and citizens' rights.

== Content ==
The book is organized into 7 chapters, each containing further subsections and finishing in 634 pages with the authors giving their conclusion and suggestions. The book starts by giving a chronology of events and a detailed information into Jaswant Singh Khalra case. The following chapters look into details of missing Sikhs and discrepancies of law and its deliberate misuse. It also presents the organizational structure of Punjab police. The book contains over 500 testimonies by the families of the victims, and describes 672 cases of alleged illegal executions by the police in the Amritsar district.

Contents
Preface
Introduction
NHRC Chronology
Chapter 1: Jaswant Singh Khalra: A Martyr for Human Rights
Chapter 2: Impunity by All Means
Chapter 3: Rights and the Dead Ends of Law
Chapter 4: Methodology
Chapter 5: Analysis of Case Summaries
Chapter 6: Summaries of Cases of Illegal Cremations included in CBI Lists
Chapter 7: Endnote: Reflections and Recommendations
Appendices

== Reviews ==
Khushwant Singh, a well-known English columnist in leading National Newspapers in India, is said to have gone volte-face on his views after reading this research work, in his own words out of his review of the book he remarks "It is spine-chilling.... Well, Mr Gill, it is not rubbish; you and the Punjab police have quite a few awkward questions to answer." The Punjab Police chief K. P. S. Gill, one of the accused in the book, had earlier dismissed the book by calling it "rubbish" in his comment to Khushwant Singh's query. However, later several police officials were charged with murder, and found guilty of kidnapping

A. J. Philip, Senior Associate Editor of The Tribune, accused CBI of not doing their jobs honestly and praised the authors of the book for taking the responsibility and doing what CBI failed to do. He wrote, "The CBI did such a shoddy job investigating the illegal cremations that truth remained hidden under mounds of illegible paperwork. It is against this backdrop that the painstaking effort of four intrepid researchers Ram Narayan Kumar, Amrik Singh, Ashok Agrwaal and Jaskaran Kaur of the Committee for Coordination on Disappearances in Punjab should be seen and commended.".

Columbia Law School Professor Peter Rosenblum wrote for preface "The careful analysis by the authors allows the reader to "pierce through the thick veils of ideology, intrigue and ‘state security’ that obscure our understanding of the campaign to pacify Punjab."
