= Chromadoridae =

Scientific classification
- Domain: Eukaryota
- Kingdom: Animalia
- Phylum: Nematoda
- Class: Chromadorea
- Order: Chromadorida
- Family: Chromadoridae

Family of nematodes

Chromadoridae is a family of nematodes belonging to the order Chromadorida.

== Genera ==
Genera:

- Acantholaimus Allgén, 1933
- Actinonema Cobb, 1920
- Algoanema Heyns & Furstenberg, 1987
- Atrochromadora Wieser, 1959
- Chromadora Bastian, 1865
- Chromadorella Filipjev, 1918
- Chromadorina Filipjev, 1918
- Chromadorissa Filipjev, 1917
- Chromadorita Filipjev, 1922
- Chromanema Khera, 1975
- Chromasora
- Crestanema Pastor de Ward, 1985
- Dasylaimus Cobb, 1933
- Deltanema Kreis, 1929
- Denticulella Cobb, 1933
- Dichromadora Kreis, 1929
- Dicriconema Steiner & Hoeppli, 1926
- Endeolophos Boucher, 1976
- Euchromadora de Man, 1886
- Euchromanema Kulikov & Dashchenko, 1991
- Graphonema Cobb, 1898
- Harpagonchoides Platonova & Potin, 1972
- Harpagonchus Platonova & Potin, 1972
- Hypodontolaimus de Man, 1886
- Innocuonema Inglis, 1969
- Karkinochromadora Blome, 1982
- Macrochromadora Kreis, 1929
- Megadontolaimus Timm, 1969
- Neochromadora Micoletzky, 1924
- Nygmatonchus Cobb, 1933
- Odontocricus Steiner, 1918
- Panduripharynx Timm, 1961
- Parachromadorita Blome, 1974
- Paradichromadora Dashchenko, 1991
- Parapinnanema Inglis, 1969
- Portmacquaria Blome, 2005
- Prochromadora Filipjev, 1922
- Prochromadorella Micoletzky, 1924
- Ptycholaimellus Cobb, 1920
- Punctodora Filipjev, 1928
- Rhabdotoderma Marion, 1870
- Rhips Cobb, 1920
- Spiliphera Bastian, 1865
- Spilophorella Filipjev, 1917
- Steineridora Inglis, 1969
- Timmia Hopper, 1961
- Trichomadora
- Trichomadorita Timm, 1961
- Trichromadora Kreis, 1929
- Trichromadorita Timm, 1961
- Tridentellia Gerlach & Riemann, 1973
- Trochamus Boucher & De Bovée, 1971
