= Chromadorida =

Scientific classification
- Domain: Eukaryota
- Kingdom: Animalia
- Phylum: Nematoda
- Class: Chromadorea
- Order: Chromadorida

Order of roundworms

Chromadorida is an order of nematodes belonging to the class Chromadorea.

Families:

- Achromadoridae Gerlach & Riemann, 1973
- Chromadoridae Filipjev, 1917
- Cyatholaimidae Filipjev, 1918
- Ethmolaimidae Lorenzen, 1981
- Neotonchidae Lorenzen, 1981
