= Archdiocese of Chittagong =

Roman Catholic archdiocese in Bangladesh

Coordinates: 22.3324°N 91.8397°E

Archdiocese of The Chattogram Metropolitan Archdiocese Archidiœcesis Chittagongensis চট্টগ্রাম মহাধর্মপ্রদেশ
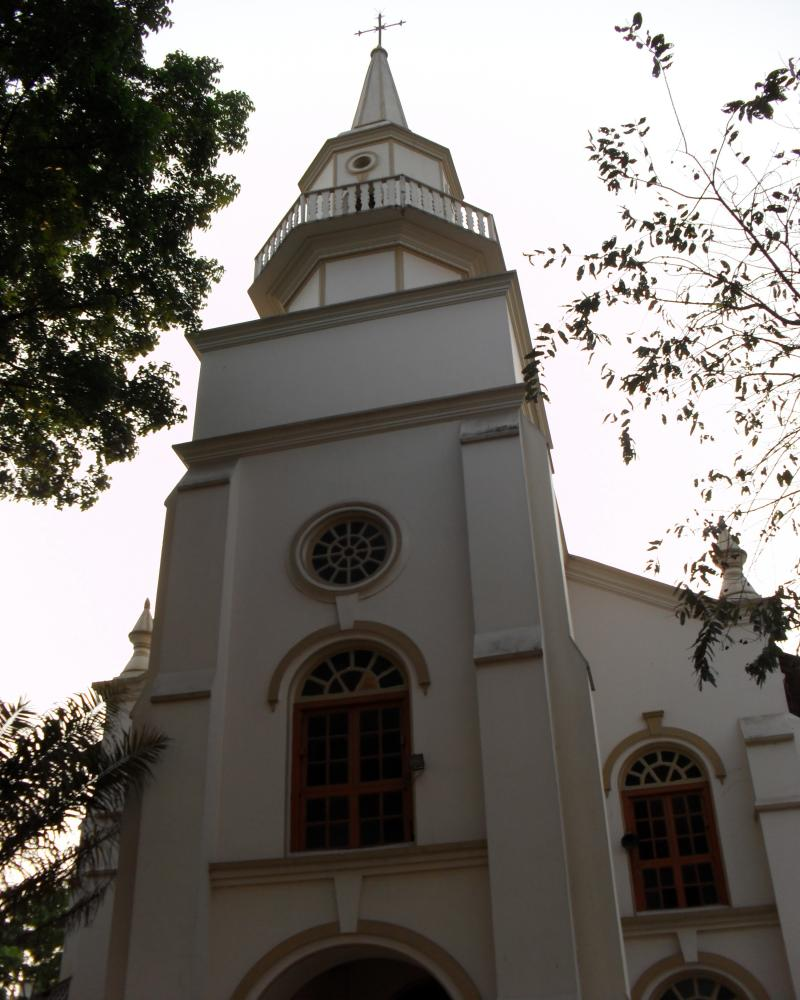

Location
- Country: Bangladesh
- Ecclesiastical province: Chattogram
- Metropolitan: Chattogram
- Headquarters: Archbishop’s House P.O. Box-152, Bandel Road, Patherghata Chattogram-4000, Bangladesh

Statistics
- Area: 44,195 km^{2} (17,064 sq mi)
- Population: Total; Catholics: (as of 2011); 34,890,000; 39,664 (0.1%)
- Parishes: Parish - 12, Quazi Parish-2

Information
- Denomination: Roman Catholic
- Rite: Latin Rite
- Established: 25 May 1927 (As Diocese of Chittagong); 2 February 2017 (As Archdiocese of Chittagong)
- Cathedral: Our Lady of the Holy Rosary Cathedral, Chattogram
- Patron saint: Our Lady of the Rosary
- Language: English, Bangla

Current leadership
- Pope: Leo XIV
- Archbishop elect: Archbishop Lawrence Subrata Howlader, CSC
- Bishops emeritus: Moses Costa

The Roman Catholic Archdiocese of Chittagong (Latin: Archidiœcesis Chittagongensis), renamed Chattogram on December 28, 2018, is an archdiocese of the Latin Church of the Catholic Church in Bangladesh. The Archdiocese of Chittagong is the metropolitan see of the ecclesiastical province of Chittagong, which includes the suffragan dioceses of the Roman Catholic Diocese of Khulna and the Roman Catholic Diocese of Barisal, both in Bangladesh. However, it remains dependent on the missionary Roman Congregation for the Evangelization of Peoples.

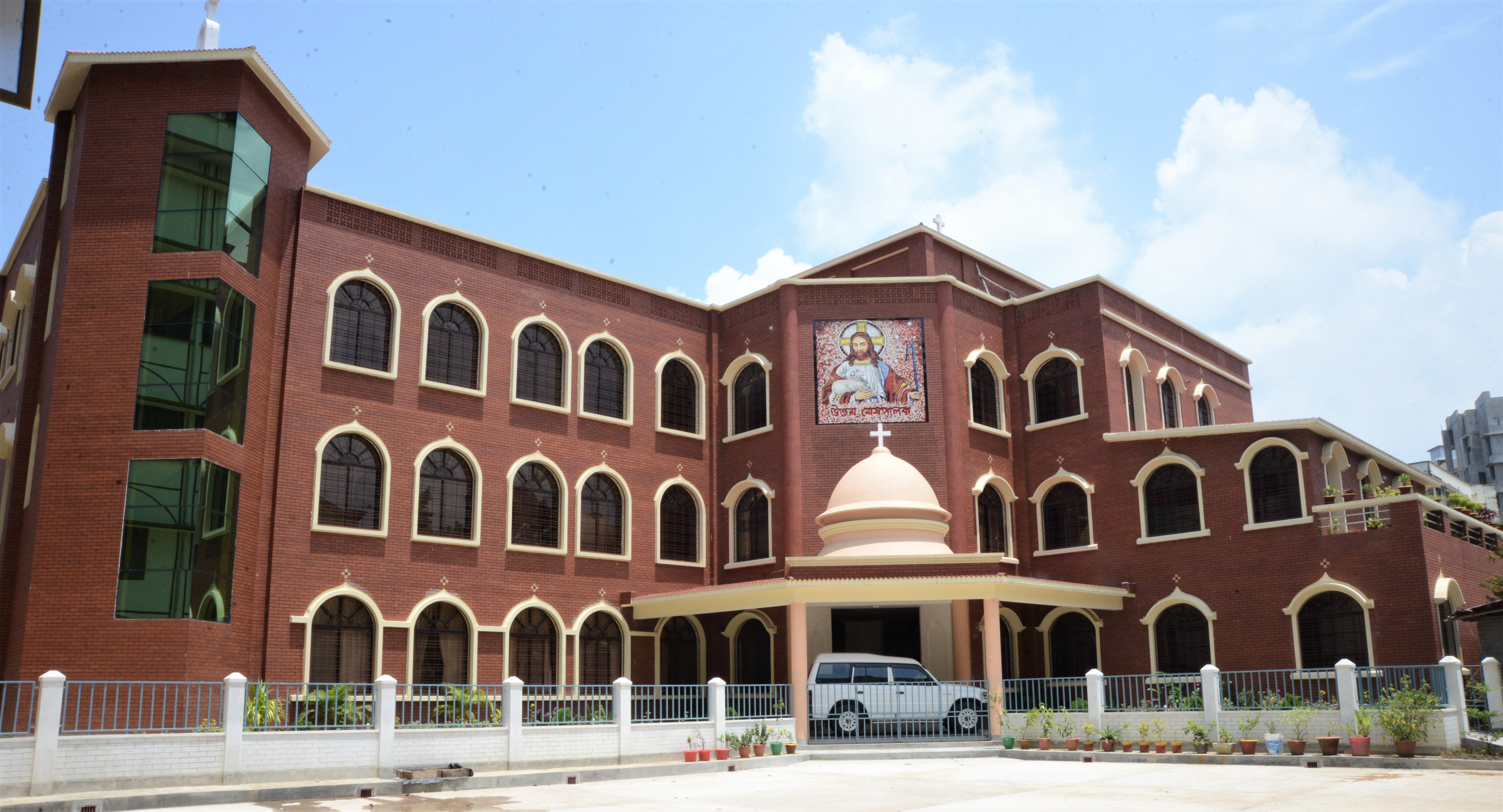
This is Archbishop House of The Chattogram Metropolitan Archdiocese

It was renamed the Archdiocese of Chattogram in 2018.

Its cathedral is Our Lady of the Holy Rosary Cathedral, in the Bengal city of Chittagong.

The Archdiocese of Chittagong comprises the 17 civil districts of Chittagong: Cox's Bazar, Bandarban, Rangamati, Khagrachori, Noakhali, Feni, Laxmipur, Bhola, Patuakhali, Pirojpur, Barisal, Jhalakathi, Borguna, Gopalganj, Madaripur and Shariatpur.

The Archdiocese is in the southern part of Bangladesh and covers 33% of the total surface of the country, making it physically its largest diocese.

== Ecclesiastical province ==
Its suffragan sees are the Roman Catholic Diocese of Barisal (its daughter) and the Roman Catholic Diocese of Khulna. Before 2 February 2017, both were under the Roman Catholic Archdiocese of Dhaka.

== History ==
In 1537, Portugal established a settlement of Dianga in the area of Chittagong, bringing the Catholic Church and missionaries with them. The first churches were set up in 1600 in a settlement which now forms Dianga and the city of Chittagong. Jesuit Father Francesco Fernandez, who came to Dianga in 1598, and who was blinded and tortured and died in captivity on November 14, 1602, is Bengal's first martyr.

In 1845 Chittagong became the seat of the first Apostolic Vicariate of Eastern Bengal, and later the administration was transferred to Dhaka. Noakhali was also the first place to have the Holy Cross missionaries who arrived there in June, 1853.

The Diocese of Chittagong was canonically erected on May 25, 1927, splitting off about half of the territory that then comprised the Diocese of Dhaka. The newly erected bishopric then included Chittagong, Noakhali, Barisal, Gournadi, Narikelbari, Haflong, Badarpur, Akyab, Sandoway, Gyeithaw and Chaugtha. It was entrusted to the care of the Canadian Province of the Congregation of Holy Cross. Atypically, its first two Ordinaries remained Titular bishops, as if merely Apostolic vicars.

Akyab, Sandoway etc. in present Myanmar were handed over to the La Salette Fathers in the future Apostolic Prefecture of Akyab in 1937–38. On 9 July 1940, the Apostolic Prefecture of Akyab (in Burma (now the Diocese of Pyay) was separated from the Diocese.

When the ecclesiastical province of Dhaka was created in July, 1950, Chittagong became a suffragan of the new Metropolitan of Dhaka.

Later in 1952, portions of the Diocese of Chittagong situated in Assam (northeast India) were detached to form the Apostolic Prefecture of Haflong, and later the then Roman Catholic Diocese of Silchar (now the Diocese of Agartala) and the Diocese of Aizawl.

On 29 December 2015, the Diocese of Barisal, now one of its suffragans, was created from the diocese.

On February 2, 2017 the bishopric was elevated by Pope Francis to metropolitan rank as Archdiocese of Chittagong, with two suffragans, and on December 28, 2018 was renamed Chattogram.

== Episcopal ordinaries ==
(all Roman rite, so far members of a Latin missionary congregation)

Suffragan Bishops of Chittagong

1. Alfredo Le Pailleur, Holy Cross Fathers (C.S.C.) (June 18, 1927 – 1951.03.08), Titular Bishop of Ciparissia (1951.03.08 – death 1952.04.12)
2. Raymond Larose, C.S.C. (March 20, 1952 – retired August 3, 1968), Titular Bishop of Thysdrus (1968.08.03 – death 1984.05.17)
3. Joachim J. Rozario, C.S.C. (August 3, 1968 – retired June 30, 1994), died 1996
4. Patrick D’Rozario, C.S.C. (February 3, 1995 – November 25, 2010); previously Bishop of Rajshahi (Bangladesh) (1990.05.21 – 1995.02.03); later Coadjutor Archbishop of Dhaka (2010.11.25 – 2011.10.22), succeeding as Metropolitan Archbishop of Dhaka (2011.10.22 – ...), also President of Catholic Bishops’ Conference of Bangladesh (2011.12 – ...), created Cardinal-Priest of Nostra Signora del SS. Sacramento e Santi Martiri Canadesi (2016.11.19 – ...)
  1. Auxiliary Bishop: Lawrence Subrata Howlader, C.S.C. (2009.05.07 – 2015.12.29), appointed Bishop of Barisal
5. Moses Costa, C.S.C. (April 6, 2011) - February 2, 2017 see below); previously Bishop of Dinajpur (Bangladesh) (1996.07.05 – 2011.04.06), Secretary General of Catholic Bishops’ Conference of Bangladesh (2007.07 – ...)

Metropolitan Archbishop of Chittagong:

1. Archbishop Moses Costa, C.S.C. (see above February 2, 2017 - December 28, 2018 see below)

Metropolitan Archbishops of Chattogram:

1. Archbishop Moses Costa, C.S.C. (see above December 28, 2018 - 13 July 2020)
2. Archbishop Lawrence Subrata Howlader, CSC appointed 19 February 2021

== Statistics ==
As per 2015, it pastorally served 48,917 Catholics (0.3% of 19,188,306 total) on 27,647 km^{2} 11 parishes with 18 priests (10 diocesan, 8 religious), 75 lay religious (10 brothers, 65 sisters) and 3 seminarians.

Recently many Garo Christians (about 1200) from Mymensingh Diocese in the North migrated to Chittagong City, the second largest city of the country and its biggest seaport city.

Bengalis count 31,700,000, that is 97.5%, who speak Bangla, the National Language. The 13 tribes amount to about 800,000, i.e. 2.5% of the total population, mainly concentrated in the Chittagong Hill Tracts and two tribes in the plain.

Tribals have their own languages although not all are written. Among the tribals the Chakmas comprise 50%, Marma 30%, Tripura 10%, Murung 4%, Tangchayanga 3% and other 3%.

=== Geographical notes ===
The Archdiocese of Chittagong, in the southern part of Bangladesh, covers 33% of the total surface of the country, making it physically the largest diocese in Bangladesh. Total land area of the archdiocese is 46,331 square kilometers. Boundaries are in the north with the Archdiocese of Dhaka and Tripura State of India, in the west with Khulna Diocese and in the east with Myanmar (Burma) and Mizoram State of India. The archdiocese is divided by Meghna river, one of the principal rivers of the country. The Chittagong Region is in the southeast part and the Barisal Region is on the other side.

== Sources and external links ==
- GCatholic.org
- Catholic Hierarchy
- Chattogram Archdiocese official website
- Chattogram Archdiocese official newssite
