= Lawrence Subrata Howlader =

Bangladeshi prelate of the Catholic church

His Grace The Most Reverend Lawrence Subrata Howlader CSC
- Metropolitan Archbishop of Chittagong
- Archdiocese: Chittagong
- Diocese: Chittagong
- Appointed: 19 February 2021
- Installed: 22 May 2021
- Predecessor: Moses Costa
- Successor: Incumbent
- Previous post: Bishop of Barisal

Orders
- Ordination: 31 December 1994
- Consecration: 3 July 2009 by Patrick D'Rozario

Personal details
- Born: 11 September 1965 (age 61) Noborgram, Barisal, Bangladesh
- Denomination: Roman Catholic
- Education: Pontifical Gregorian University
- Motto: Let's enter in the house of the Lord

Lawrence Subrato Howlader, C.S.C. (born 11 September 1965) is a Bangladeshi prelate of the Catholic Church who has been the bishop of the Barisal, Bangladesh, since 2016. From 2009 to 2016 he was auxiliary bishop of Chittagong, officially known as Chattogram since 2018, where he was appointed metropolitan archbishop in February 2021.

== Education ==
Lawrence completed his schooling from Barisal and Gournadi. He acquired Bachelor of Arts degree from Government Brojomohun College, Barisal and holds Licentiate in Depth Psychology, Spirituality & Counseling from Gregorian University, Rome.

== Priesthood ==
He joined the Congregation of Holy Cross in 1987 and took his final vows on 6 August 1993. He was ordained a priest on 31 December 2004.

== Episcopate ==
On 7 May 2009, Pope Benedict XVI appointed him titular bishop of Afufenia and auxiliary bishop of Chittagong. He received his episcopal consecration on 3 July 2009.

On 29 December 2015, Pope Francis appointed Howlader the first bishop of Barisal. He was installed in his new diocese on 29 January 2016.

On 19 February 2021, Pope Francis appointed him archbishop of Chattogram.
