= Madhav Chandroba Dukle =

Goan editor and publisher (1825 – 1885)

Madhav Chandroba Dukle (1825 – 1885) was an editor and publisher of early Marathi poetry from Goa. He is best known for establishing Sarvasangraha, a monthly magazine that pioneered the use of modern punctuation marks in printed Marathi literature.

== Early life and business ==
Madhav Chandroba Dukle was born in 1825 in Calangute, Portuguese Goa. He later operated in Bombay, where he ran a business selling medicines and worked in photography.

== Literary career ==
=== Sarvasangraha ===
In 1860, Dukle started a monthly magazine titled Sarvasangraha with the objective of publishing the works of historical poets and refining the language. His brother, Anant Chandroba, as well as Parshuram (Tatya) Godbole and Bal Yajneshwar Padhye all collaborated with him to edit this periodical.

Sarvasangraha introduced the practice of using punctuation marks while printing historical Marathi poetry. The magazine helped cultivate an interest in studying ancient Marathi literature. It featured various historical poetic works, including Moropant's compositions such as Aryabharat, Mantrabhagavat, Madalasopakhyan, and Brahmottarkhand. It also featured three chapters (parvas) of Mukteshwar's version of the Bharat.

=== Editorial works and dictionary ===
Apart from his magazine, Dukle edited and published several independent volumes of devotional poetry, including:

- Namdev's Balakrida and Abhang (1862)
- Tukaram's Abhang (1866)
- Mukteshwar's Virat Parva (1867)
- Ramdas's Abhang (1868)

In 1870, with the assistance of Krishnashastri Pendse and Awasakar, Dukle compiled a dictionary titled Shabdaratnakar va Sanskrit ani Prakrit Shabda-kosh. At the time of its publication, it was the largest Sanskrit–Prakrit dictionary available. The volume notably featured detailed breakdowns and explanations of technical terminology related to medical science.

== Death ==
Dukle died in 1885.
