= Christianity in Tripura =

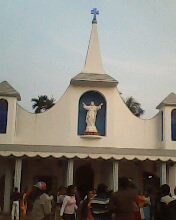
A church in Agartala

Christianity is one of the religions in Tripura, a state in North East India. According to the Indian Census 2011, the population of Christians in Tripura is 159,882 or 4.35% of the total population. Christians are mostly found among the indigenous communities of the state such as the Tripuri, Lushai, Kuki, Darlong, Halam etc. Among the Scheduled Tribes of the state Christians share is 13.12% of the population.

== History ==
The beginning of the Christian faith in Tripura dates back many centuries. Fr. Ignatius Gomes, a Jesuit priest made the first reference to the Christians of Mariamnagar in Agartala when he visited them in 1683. Fr. P. Barbe, the Pastor of Chittagong, visited Tripura in 1843. Holy Cross pioneering missionaries Fr. Louis Augustine Verite and Fr. Beboit Adolphe Mercier visited Agartala in 1856 and administered sacraments to the Christians in Mariamnagar Village. But it was only from 1937 that priests began to take permanent residence at Mariamnagar.

The Tripura Baptist Christian Union was formed under the leadership of Rev. M.J. Eade in December 1938 in Lakshmilunga, a village six miles from Agartala. The Baptist Mission Compound at Arundhutinagar, Agartala was also established in the year 1938 under an official land grant by the then King of Tripura Kingdom Maharaja Bir Bikram Kishore Manikya to the missionaries from New Zealand Baptist Missionary Society (NZBMS).

The first Roman Catholic Parish in Tripura was erected at Mariamnagar in 1939. The first permanent Church (at present the temporary Cathedral) was blessed in 1952. Because of its geographical proximity, the Archdiocese of Dhaka continued to cater to the spiritual needs of the Catholics in Tripura till the erection of the new Ecclesiastical Unit in 1952, namely, the Prefecture of Haflong. In 1969, the Prefecture was upgraded to the position of a Diocese and Most Rev. Denzil D'Souza, DD, was the first Bishop of Silchar. At that time the Diocese comprised the States of Mizoram and Tripura and the District of Cachar in Assam. On 11 January 1996, Pope John Paul II decreed the erection of the Diocese of Agartala. The new Diocese of Agartala, comprising the entire State of Tripura was bifurcated from the erstwhile Diocese of Silchar. Most Rev. Lumen Monteiro, CSC, DD, was appointed the first Bishop of the new Diocese. He was ordained and installed on 26 May 1996.

== Denominations ==
The major denominations of Christianity present in the state are the Baptist, Presbyterian Church of India (PCI) and the Roman Catholic Churches. There are also many churches of the Believers' Church, Assembly of God, Evangelical and Christian Churches in the state. and also Christian Revival Church.

=== Statistics ===
Denomination	Churches	Members
Tripura Baptist Christian Union (TBCU)	1,049	120,070
Roman Catholic Church	110	49,000
Tripura Presbyterian Church Synod (PCI)	325	22,277
Believers Church	500	20,000
Independent Church of India (ICI)	44	5,000
Total	2,028	216,347

== Demographics ==
Historical Christian Population in Tripura
Year	Pop.	±%
1901	138	—
1911	138	+0.0%
1921	1,860	+1247.8%
1931	2,596	+39.6%
1941	328	−87.4%
1951	5,262	+1504.3%
1961	10,039	+90.8%
1971	15,713	+56.5%
1981	24,872	+58.3%
1991	46,472	+86.8%
2001	102,489	+120.5%
2011	159,882	+56.0%
Source: census of India

=== Trends ===
Percentage of Christians in Tripura by decades

Year	Percent	Increase
1901	0.08%	-
1911	0.06%	-0.02%
1921	0.61%	+0.55%
1931	0.68%	+0.07%
1941	0.06%	-0.62%
1951	0.82%	+0.76%
1961	0.88%	+0.02%
1971	1.01%	+0.13%
1981	1.21%	+0.20%
1991	1.69%	+0.48%
2001	3.20%	+1.51%
2011	4.35%	+1.15%

=== Tribes ===
Percentage of Christians in the Scheduled Tribes

Tribe	Christians	Percent
Tripuri	51,753	8.74%
Riang	32,509	17.27%
Halam	27,025	47.24%
Kuki	9,784	89.23%
Garo	8,370	64.62%
Jamatia	7,465	8.96%
Lushai	5,253	97.57%
Uchoi	1,778	72.66%
Munda	605	4.16%
Chakma	295	0.37%
Mag	139	0.37%
Noatia	122	0.86%
Khasi	115	67.49%

== Major churches ==
1. Agartala Baptist Church, first church in Agartala city.
2. Jangalia Baptist Church, largest Baptist church in the state.
3. Mariamnagar Catholic Parish, oldest Christian community in the state
4. Zion Baptist Church established in 1983
5. Birchandra Baptist Church (KBPC)
6. Khumulwng Baptist Church

== See also ==
- Tripura Baptist Christian Union
- Tripura Presbyterian Church Synod
- Roman Catholic Diocese of Agartala
- List of Christian denominations in North East India
- Christian Revival Church

== Bibliography ==
- Debbarma, Sukhendu (1996) Origin and Growth of Christianity in Tripura: With Special Reference to the New Zealand Baptist Missionary Society, 1938-1988, Indus Publishing, New Delhi. ISBN 81-7387-038-1
- Borok Baptist Convention, Rangchak Mukumu, 2010
- Jain, Sandhya (2010). Evangelical intrusions: [Tripura, a case study]. New Delhi: Rupa & Co.
