= Lumen Monteiro =

Indian prelate of the Catholic Church (born 1952)

Most Reverend Lumen Monteiro
- Bishop of Agartala
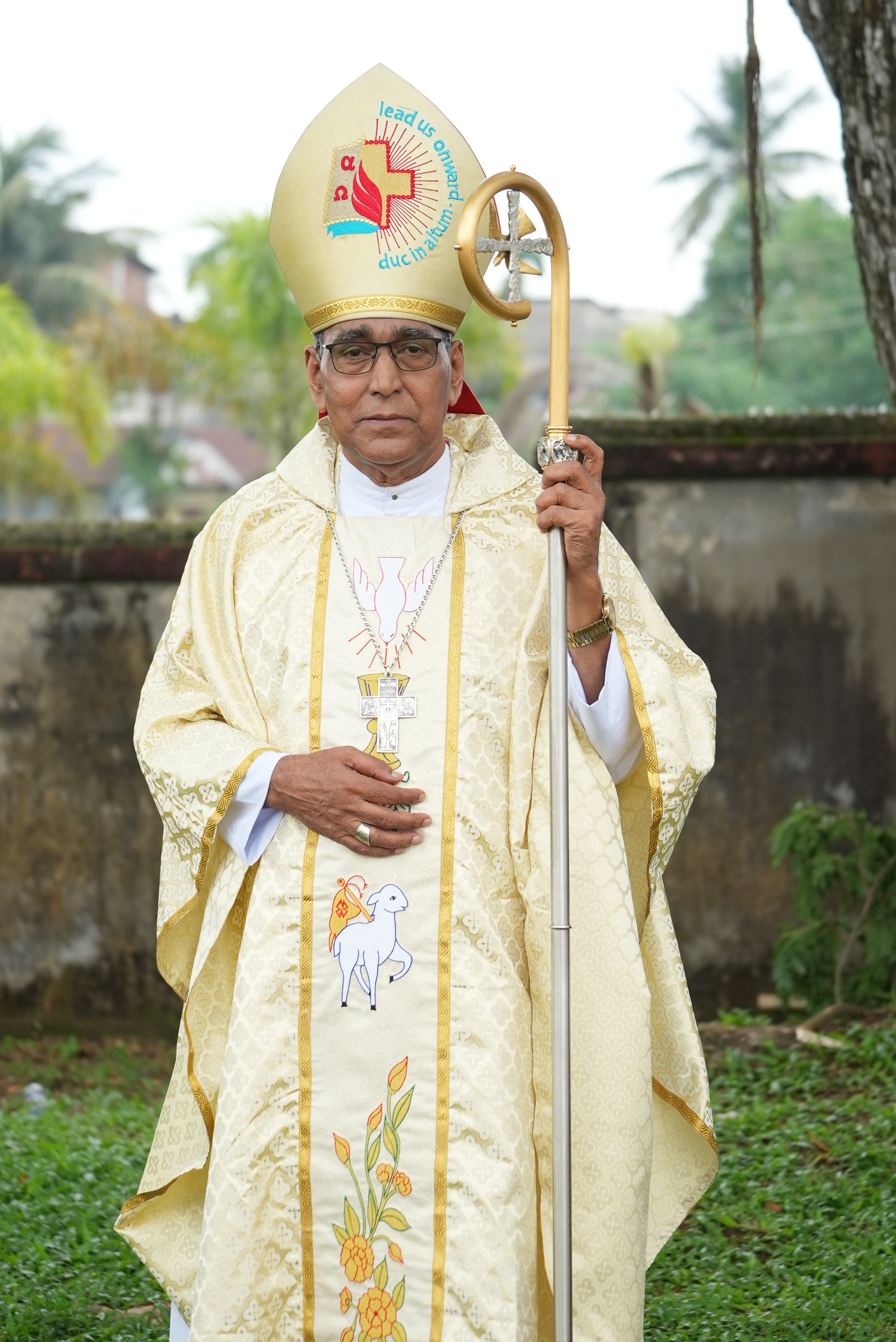
- Church: Catholic Church; Latin Church
- Diocese: Agartala
- Appointed: 11 January 1996
- Predecessor: Diocese erected
- Successor: Incumbent
- Previous posts: Chairman, CCBI Commission on Ecumenism (1997‍–‍2001); Apostolic administrator of Aizawl (2000‍–‍2001); Chairman, Caritas India (?‍–‍2020); Chairman of North Eastern Diocesan Social Forum; CCBI representative on Caritas India governing body; Chairman, CCBI office for Healthcare

Personal details
- Born: 1 February 1952 (age 74) Calangute, Goa, India
- Motto: Lead Us Onwards

Ordination history
History
Episcopal consecration
- Principal consecrator: Tarcisius Resto Phanrang
- Co-consecrators: Denzil Reginald D'Souza, Joseph Mittathany

Lumen Monteiro (born 1 February 1952) is an Indian prelate of the Catholic Church, who serves as the bishop of the Latin Catholic Diocese of Agartala.

== Early life ==
Monteiro was born on 1 February 1952 in Calangute, Goa, India.

== Priesthood ==
Monteiro joined the Congregation of Holy Cross and professed his vows on 30 May 1974 and was ordained as a priest on 28 October 1980.

== Episcopate ==
Pope John Paul II appointed Monteiro as bishop of the newly erected Diocese of Agartala on 11 January 1996 and he received his episcopal consecration on 26 May 1996. His episcopal motto is "Lead Us Onward."

From 1997 to 2001, Monteiro was chairman of the CCBI Commission on Ecumenism.

From 18 October 2000 to 2 October 2001, Monteiro served as apostolic administrator of the neighboring diocese of Aizawl after its bishop, Denzil Reginald D'Souza, became ill and retired.

He chaired the North Eastern Diocesan Social Forum and was a representative of the Conference of Catholic Bishops of India on the Governing Body of Caritas India.

He was also the chairman of the CCBI office for Healthcare for one term from 2023 to 2026. He previously served as chairman of Caritas India for two terms until February 2020.

== Gallery ==
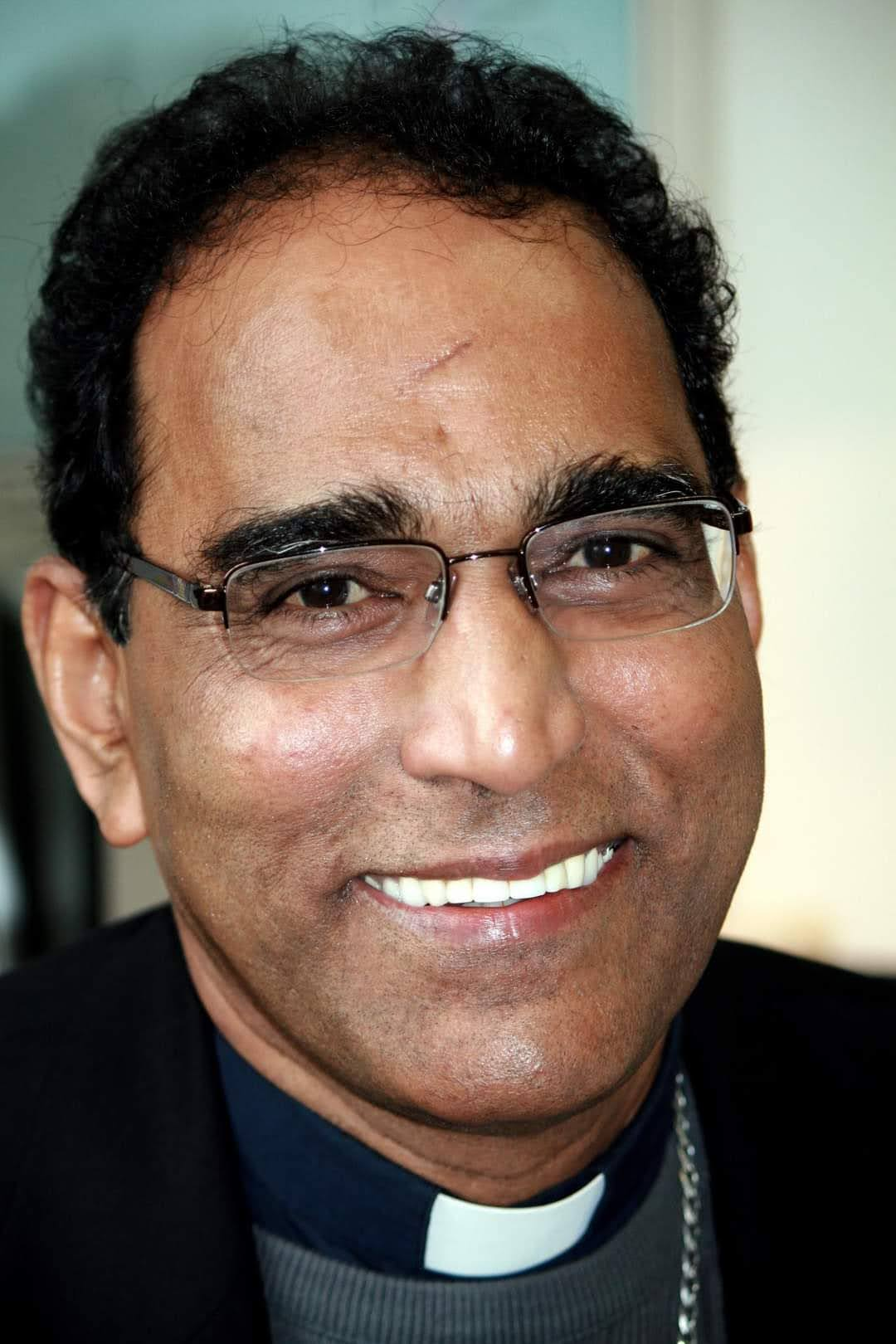

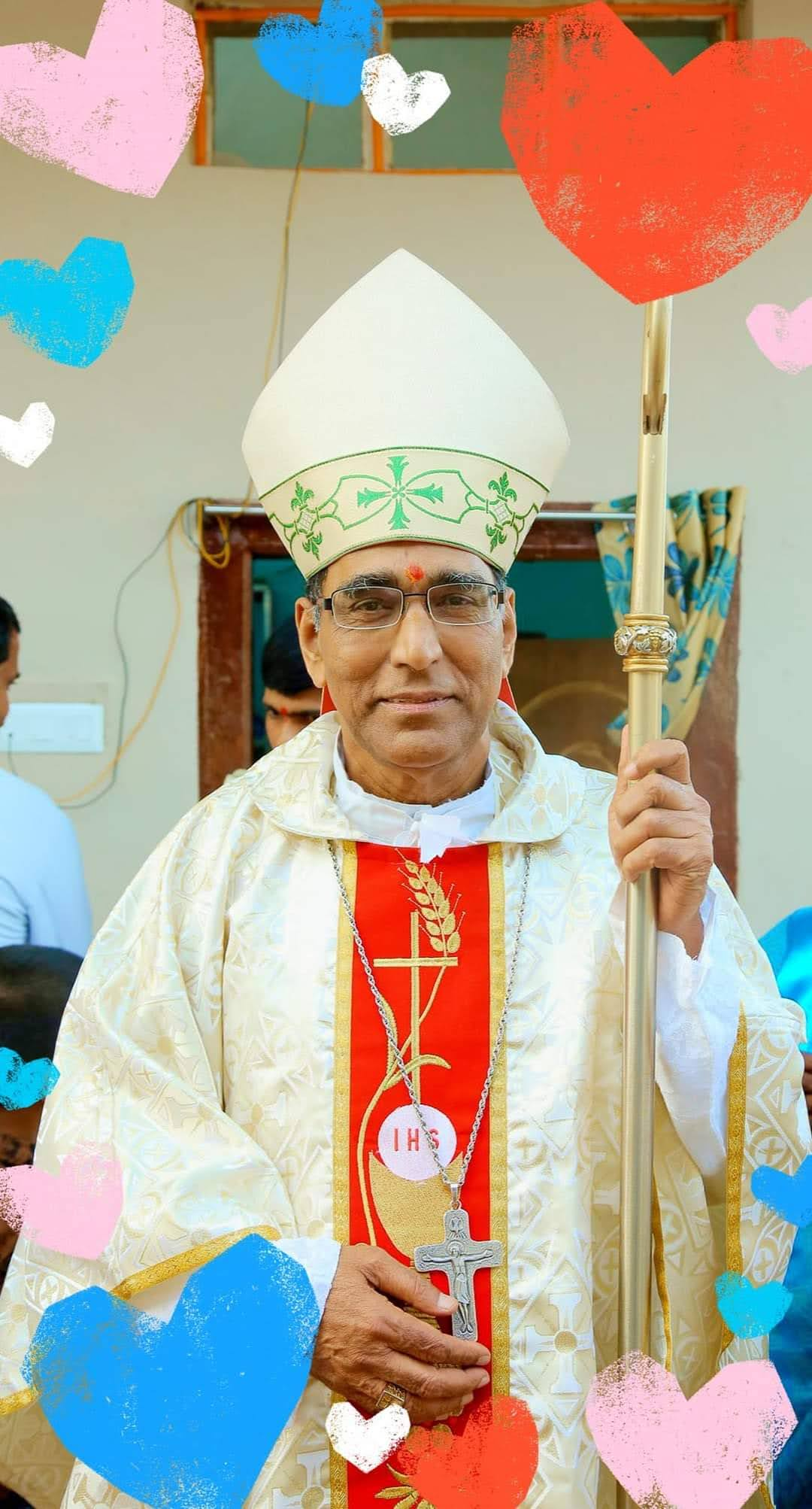

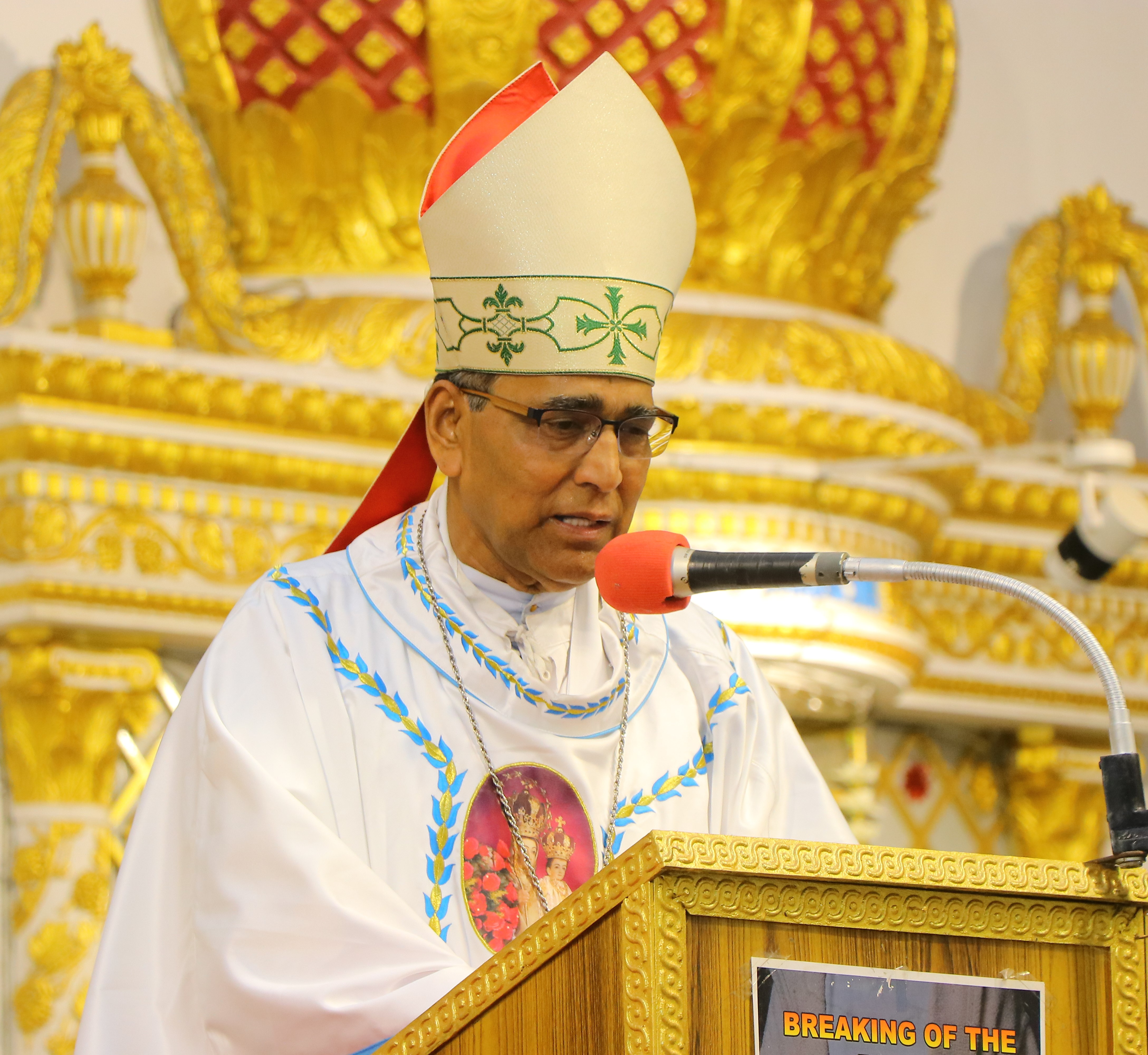

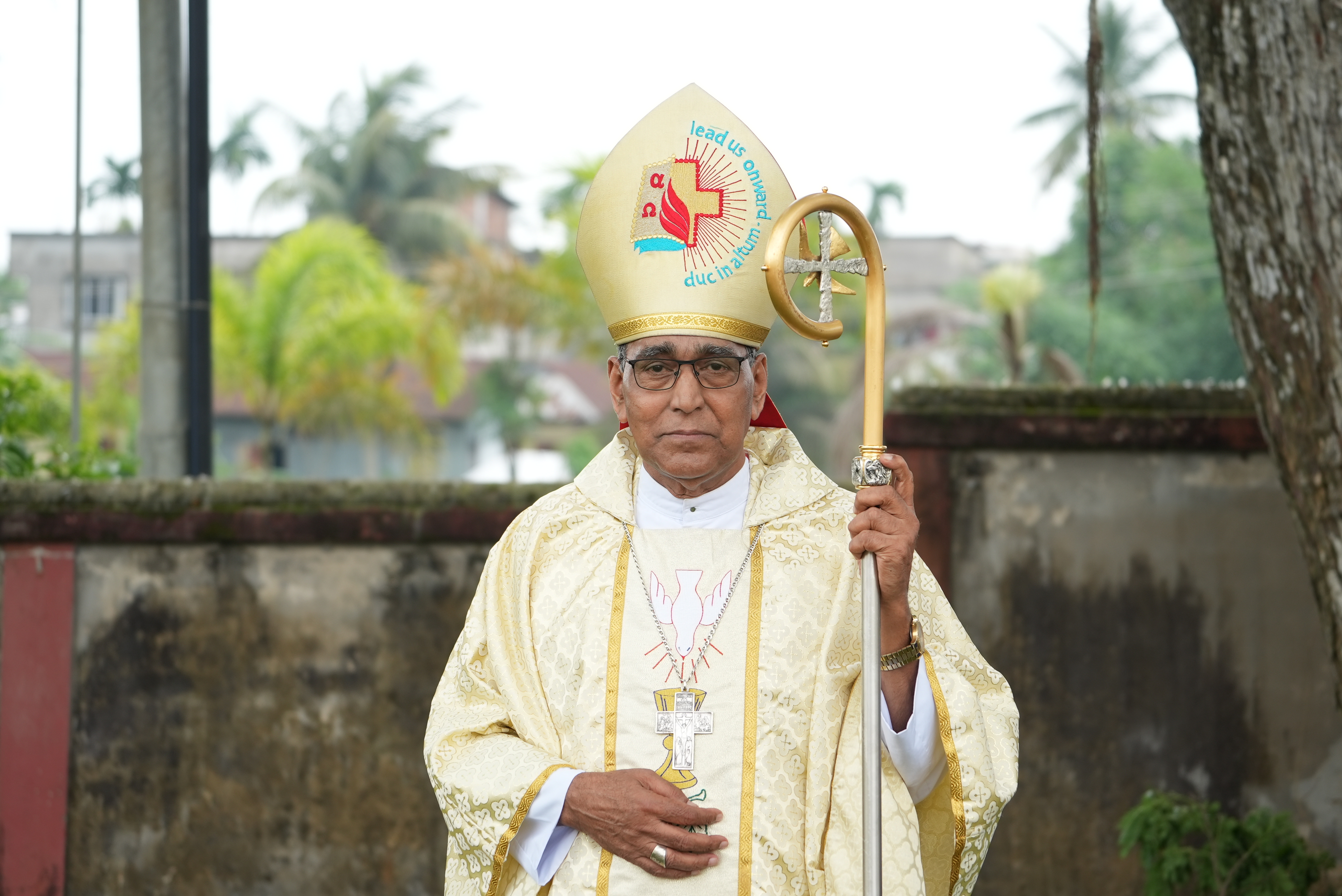

== See also ==
- Catholic Church in India
