= Stephen Rotluanga =

Catholic bishop of Aizawl in Mizoram, India

Most Reverend Stephen Rotluanga
- Bishop of Aizawl
- Archdiocese: Shillong
- Diocese: Aizawl
- Appointed: 2 October 2001
- Predecessor: Denzil Reginald D’Souza
- Successor: Incumbent
- Other post: Chairman of the North East Regional Laity Commission

Orders
- Ordination: 13 December 1981 by Denzil Reginald D'Souza
- Consecration: 2 February 2002 by Charles Asa Schleck

Personal details
- Born: 8 June 1952 (age 74) Sakawrtuichhun, Aizawl, Mizoram
- Denomination: Roman Catholic
- Residence: Bishop's House, Ramthar, Aizawl, Mizoram
- Parents: Luke Robula and Lucy Darhmingliani
- Occupation: Bishop of Aizawl
- Profession: Catholic bishop, artist, sculptor, cartoonist
- Education: St. Joseph's College, Bangalore Jnana Deepa, Institute of Philosophy and Theology, Pune Ontario College of Art and Design, Toronto, Canada
- Motto: TO SERVE IN UNITY

Stephen Rotluanga is a Mizo Catholic prelate, dramatist, painter, sculptor, cartoonist, and caricaturist who is serving as the second and current Bishop of the Roman Catholic Diocese of Aizawl. He was consecrated in 2002, becoming the first ever Mizo to be ordained a bishop.

== Early life and education ==
Born on 8 June 1952 at Sakawrtuichhun, Aizawl, Mizoram, he is the fourth child of Luke Robula and Lucy Darhmingliani and has 7 siblings. He is a part of the Khiangte clan. He finished his BA from St. Joseph's College, Bangalore and his B.Phil and Bachelor of Theology from Jnana Deepa, Institute of Philosophy and Theology, Pune. During the course of his clerical studies, he finished academic training on Mass Media and Communication from St. Xavier's College, Mumbai and Social Communication from NITIKA, Kolkata, with distinction grades. Bishop Stephen also completed courses in Pastoral Psychology Counselling and Youth, Liturgical and Prayer Experience Course from the NBCLC, Bangalore

He holds a distinction grade in Fine Arts specialization from the Ontario College of Art and Design, Toronto, Canada and has undergone professional artistic training in Florence, Italy.

He also holds the degrees of Bachelor and Doctor of Divinity.

Apart from his native Mizo, he speaks fluent English and has an adequate working knowledge of Hindi. He has good command of Italian and Latin.

== Priesthood ==
He was ordained as a priest in the Congregation of Holy Cross on 3 December 1981 by the then Bishop of Silchar, Most. Rev. Denzil Reginald D'Souza who was also incharge of the Mizoram region at Christ the King Cathedral, Kulikawn, Aizawl. He was first officially assigned the post of Assistant Parish Priest at Champhai from 1982 to 1985. He was elevated to Parish Priest in 1985 after the incumbent was transferred. He served as Parish Priest till 1994 and also served as the Youth Director of the Mizoram Catholic Thalai Pawl (Mizo Catholic Youth Association) from 1985 to 1992. Father Stephen was then known as "The Singing Priest" having the most melodious voice among all the priest of the region. Rotluanga served as the Head of the Holy Cross Students Home in Bangalore from 1994 to 1995 and then served as Rector for the Holy Cross Seminarians in Agartala from 2000 to 2001. He also simultaneously served as the Head of the Department of Art and Communication in Holy Cross School in Agartala, Tripura.

== Episcopate ==
On 2 October 2001, he was appointed Bishop of Aizawl by Pope John Paul II and ordained on 2 February 2002 in AR Lammual by Archbishop Charles Asa Schleck, setting record for the most number of people attending mass in Aizawl diocese history. He succeeded Most. Rev. Denzil Reginald D'Souza, who had ordained him in 1981. He is the first ever person from the Zo people community to be ordained a bishop. As bishop, he also has episcopal jurisdiction over the Barak Valley in Assam. He also currently serves as chairman of the North East Regional Laity Commission.

== Art ==
Rotluanga is a painter, sketcher, caricaturist and cartoonist with specializations in Renaissance Art. He has held various national and international art exhibitions but has never sold a single artwork. He still maintains a studio in the official Bishop House in Aizawl and most of his paintings are still with him. He said that Michelangelo and Leonardo da Vinci are his greatest influences. He is famous for his nude paintings, what he calls as "human figures created by God."

== See also ==
- Catholic Church in India
