= Our Lady of the Holy Rosary Cathedral, Chittagong =

Our Lady of the Holy Rosary Cathedral
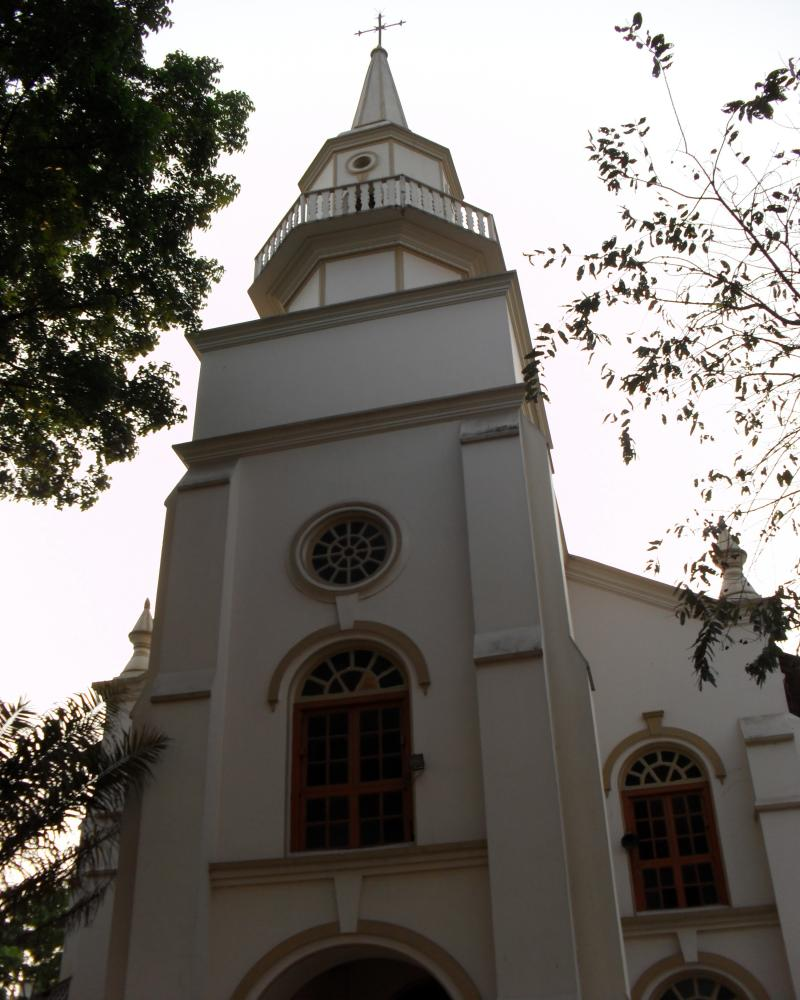
- Our Lady of the Holy Rosary Cathedral
- 22.3324782°N 91.8394112°E
- Location: Chittagong
- Country: Bangladesh
- Denomination: Roman Catholic Church

History
- Dedication: Our Lady of the Holy Rosary
- Consecrated: 1843

Administration
- Archdiocese: Roman Catholic Archdiocese of Chittagong

The Cathedral of Our Lady of the Holy Rosary is a cathedral belonging to the Catholic Church located in the city of Chittagong, the second largest city in Bangladesh. It is the seat, or cathedra, of the Roman Catholic Archdiocese of Chittagong.

The present cathedral was built during British rule in 1843 and the last renovation was in 1933.

== See also ==
- Roman Catholicism in Bangladesh
