= Tripura Presbyterian Church Synod =

- Classification: Protestant
- Orientation: Calvinist
- Scripture: Holy Bible
- Polity: Presbyterian
- Governance: Synod
- Associations: Presbyterian Church of India
- Region: Tripura
- Headquarters: Agartala
- Origin: 20 July 1986
- Congregations: 325
- Members: 22,277
- Ministers: 16

The Tripura Presbyterian Church Synod is one of the constituent units of the Presbyterian Church of India. It has its headquarters in Agartala, Tripura. It has 325 churches and 22,277 members mostly among the indigenous peoples of Tripura.

== History ==
Mizoram Presbyterian Church Synod Meeting in 1985 finally gave its consent to officially begin Presbyterian Church of Tripura (PCT) within Tripura State. June 1986 Synod Executive Committee then sent Senior Pastor Rev. Thangdela to administer the whole Presbyterian Church of Tripura whose office was stationed at Noagang. Subsequently, Presbyterian Church of Tripura Inauguration Service was undertaken by Synod Moderator Rev. Robawiha at Noagang Church on July 20, 1986. 1988 Synod conference assigned Tripura mission be under the administration of Synod Mission Board. On December 19, 1987, Mizo Synod and Tripura Baptist Christian Union (TBCU) made an agreement as to how the two churches will go on side by side. The Synod Mission Board (SMB), which represents Mizo Synod, after all, became so successful to spread the Gospel of Christ in Tripura Mission Field.

== Education ==
Presently, Tripura Mission Field has two Mission High School:

1. Bethlehem English School (at Noagang Village), and
2. Calvary High School (at Tuidu Village).

And four Mission Middle Schools:

1. Maranatha English School (at Ambassa Town),
2. Elpis English School (at Pecharthal Village),
3. Charisma English School (at Karbook Village), and
4. Hermon English School (at Burburia Village).

== Medical and Health Mission ==
Tripura Mission Field also has eleven Medical Centres at Tuingoi, Noagang, Kameswar, Seisimdung, Burburia, Pecharthal, Ganganagar, Ambassa, Tuidu, Kalachhara and Ruprai. All these centres are equipped with full-time Nurse/Health workers, medicines and first aid medical instruments.

== Statistics ==
Statistics	Number
Presbyteries	4
Churches	325
Minister (Pastor, etc.)	16
Ordained Elders	167
Total members	22,277

== See also ==
- Tripura Baptist Christian Union
- Christianity in Tripura
- Presbyterian Church of India
- Roman Catholic Diocese of Agartala
- List of Christian denominations in North East India
