= Church of Shantir Rani =

Church in Tripura, India

- Country: India
- Denomination: Roman Catholic

History
- Status: Active
- Founded: 1939; 87 years ago
- Dedication: Blessed Virgin Mary

Architecture
- Functional status: Parish Church

Administration
- Diocese: Roman Catholic Diocese of Agartala
- Parish: Shantir Rani Parish

Clergy
- Bishop: Lumen Monteiro

Shantir Rani Church (queen of peace) is a pro cathedral church situated in Mariam Nagar, Agartala, India. Church serves as a parish church for the Shantir Rani parish in the Roman Catholic Diocese of Agartala.

== See also ==
- List of cathedrals in India
