= Calangute =

- Town
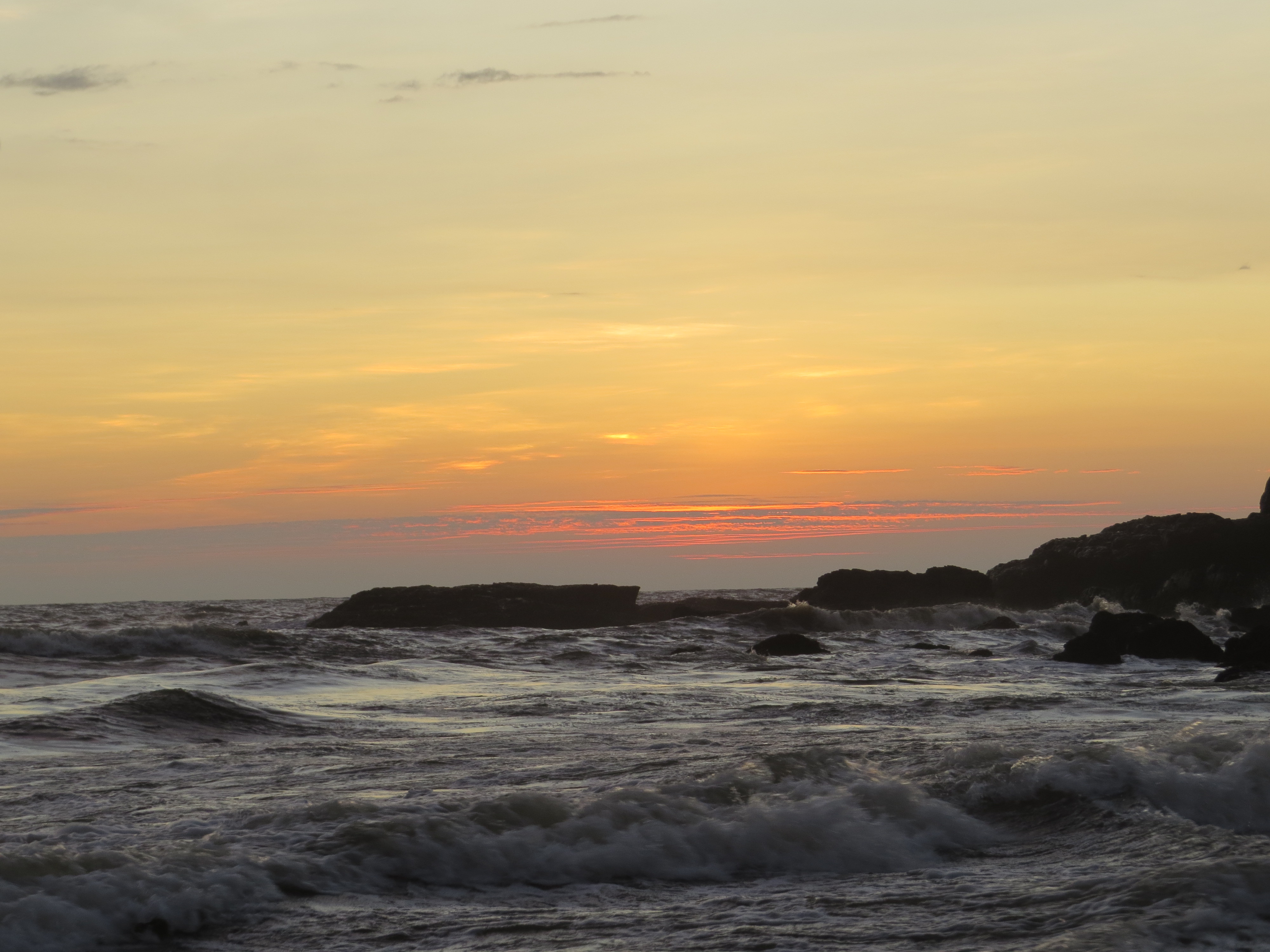
- Waves thrashing at the shore Calangute, Goa, India.

- Location of Calangute in Goa Calangute (India)
- Coordinates: 15°32′30″N 73°45′43″E
- Country: India
- State: Goa
- District: North Goa
- Sub-district: Bardez

Population (2011)
  - Total: 13,810
- Time zone: UTC+5:30 (IST)
- PIN: 403516
- Area code: 0832

Calangute is a town in the North Goa district of the Indian state of Goa. It is famous for its beach, the largest in North Goa and a popular tourist destination. The peak tourist season is during Christmas and New Year, and during the summer in May.

== Demographics ==
As of the 2011 India census, Calangute had a population of 13,810. Males constituted 54% of the population and females 46%. Calangute had an average literacy rate of 73%, higher than the national average of 59.5%; male literacy was 78% and female literacy 67%. 10% of the population was under 6 years of age.

== Government and politics ==
Calangute is part of Calangute (Goa Assembly constituency) and North Goa (Lok Sabha constituency).

== Education ==
Calangute has secondary education schools viz. Little Flower of Jesus High School, St. Josephs High School, Don Bosco High School, Mark Memorial High School, apart from the Government Primary schools located in Umtavaddo & Naikavaddo.

== In media ==
Lorna Cordeiro recorded a song in Konkani titled "Calangute" about the town and Calangute Beach.

== Notable residents ==
- Bruno Coutinho – captained the India national football team.
- Lumen Monteiro – Indian prelate of the Catholic Church (born 1952), bishop of diocese of Agartala in Tripura, was born in Calangute

== Sports ==
Like any other Goan village, Calangute's most famous sport is football. The local football club is Calangute Association, which represents them in Goa's top-tier league, the Goa Professional League.

== Gallery ==
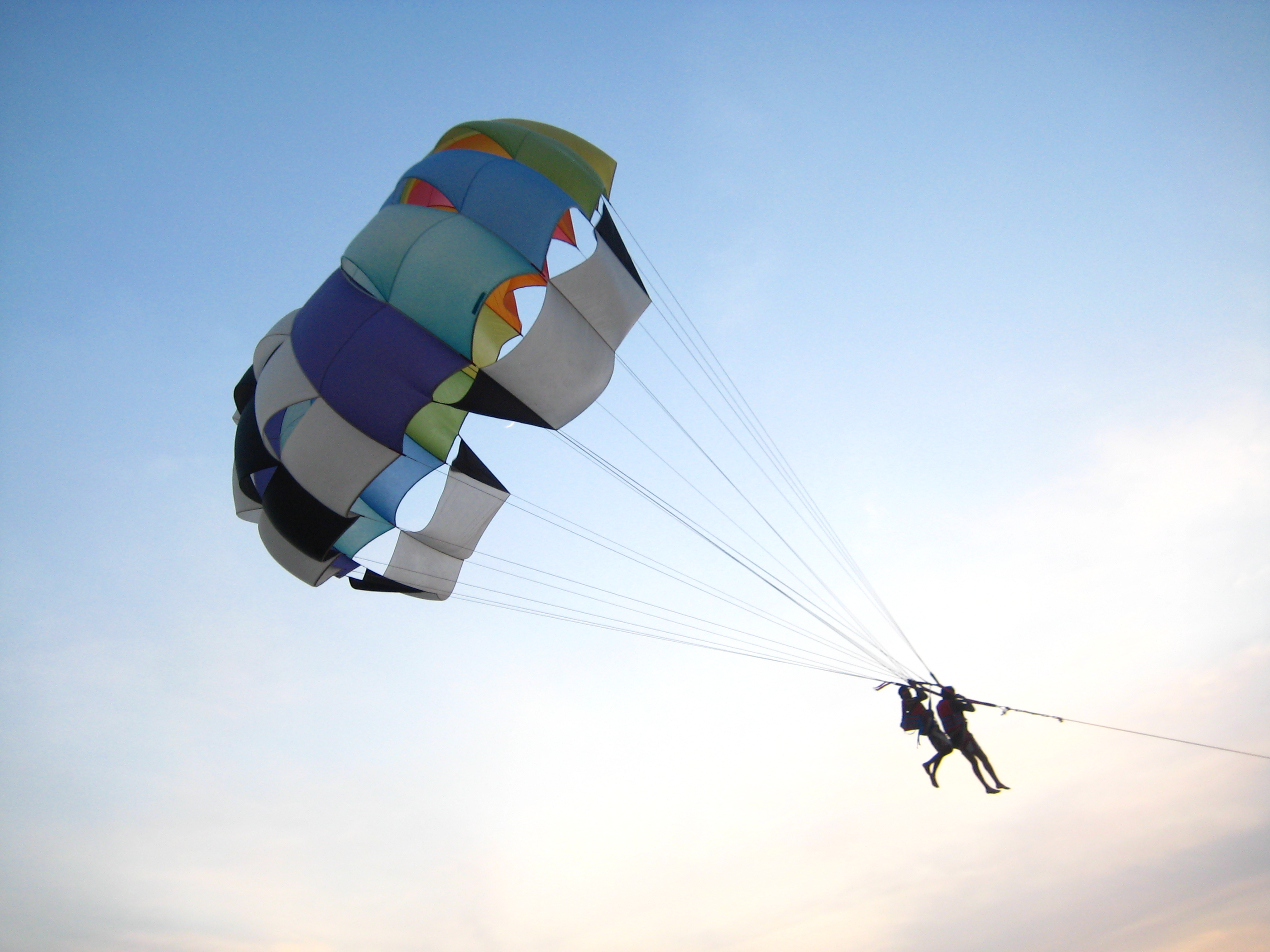
Parasailing at Calangute Beach

Parasailing at Calangute beach in December 2006

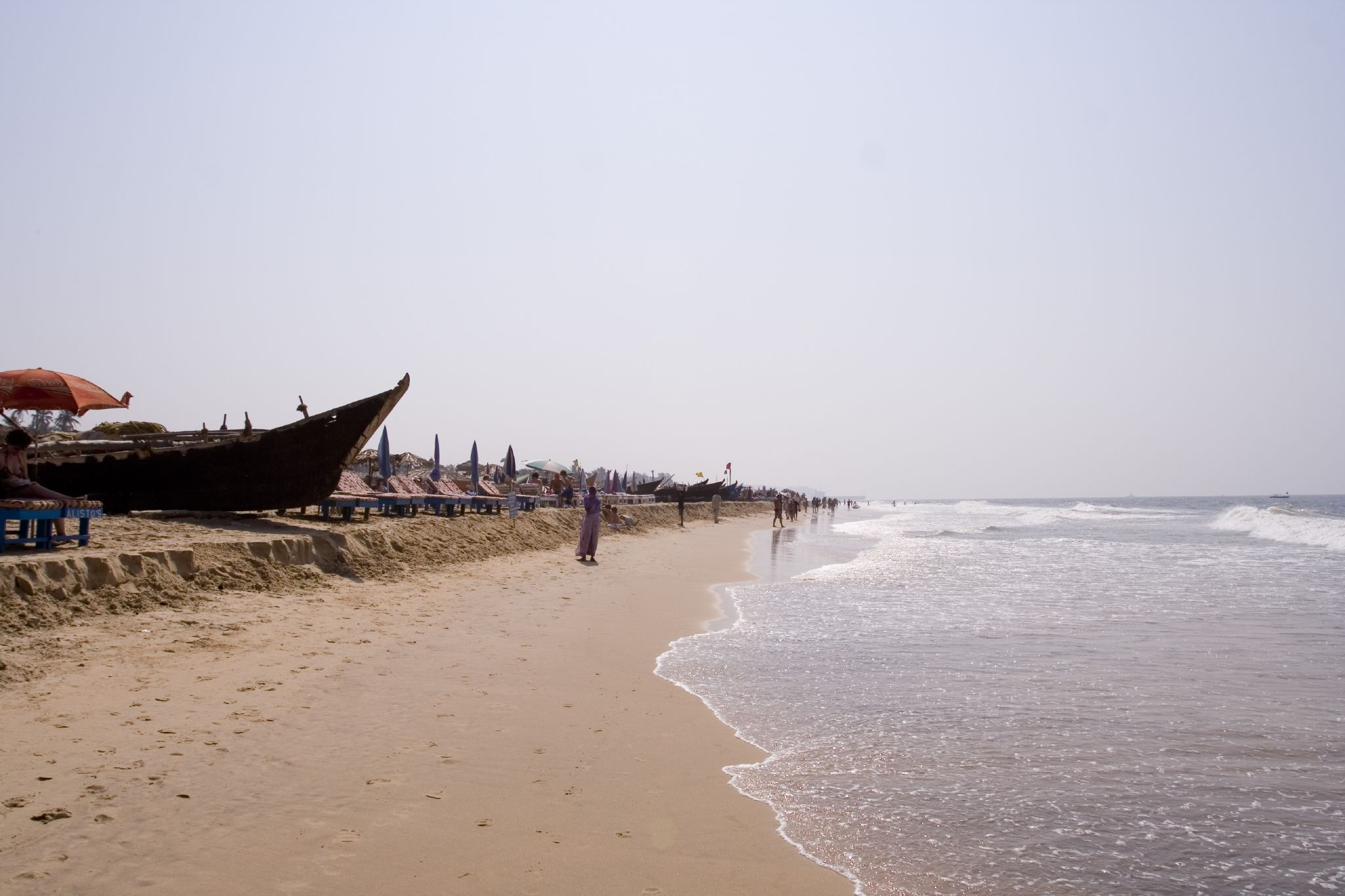
Boats at Calangute Beach

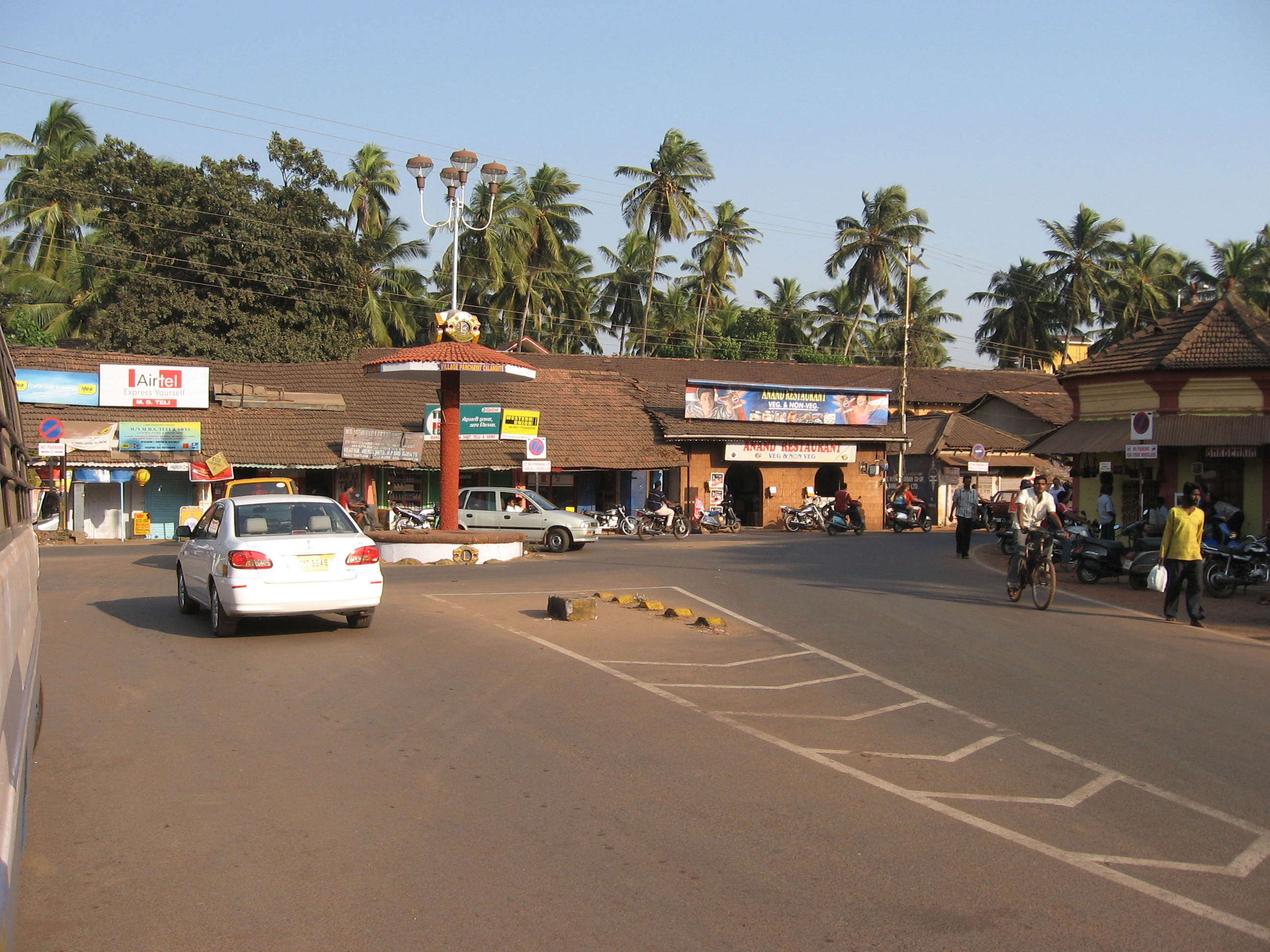
The tinto (market) at Calangute

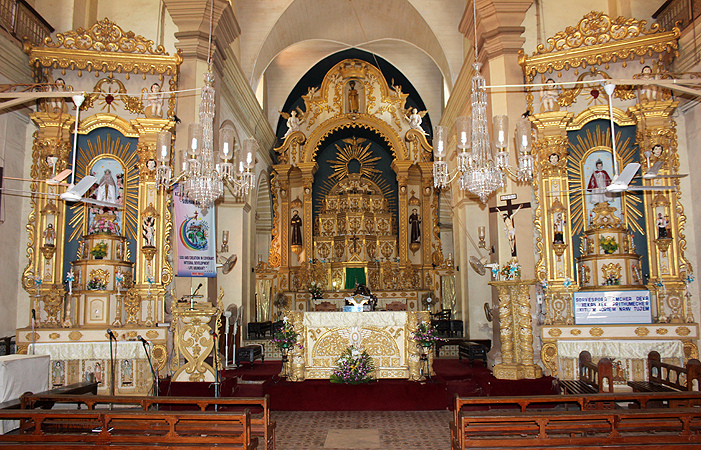
Altars at St. Alex Church, Calangute.

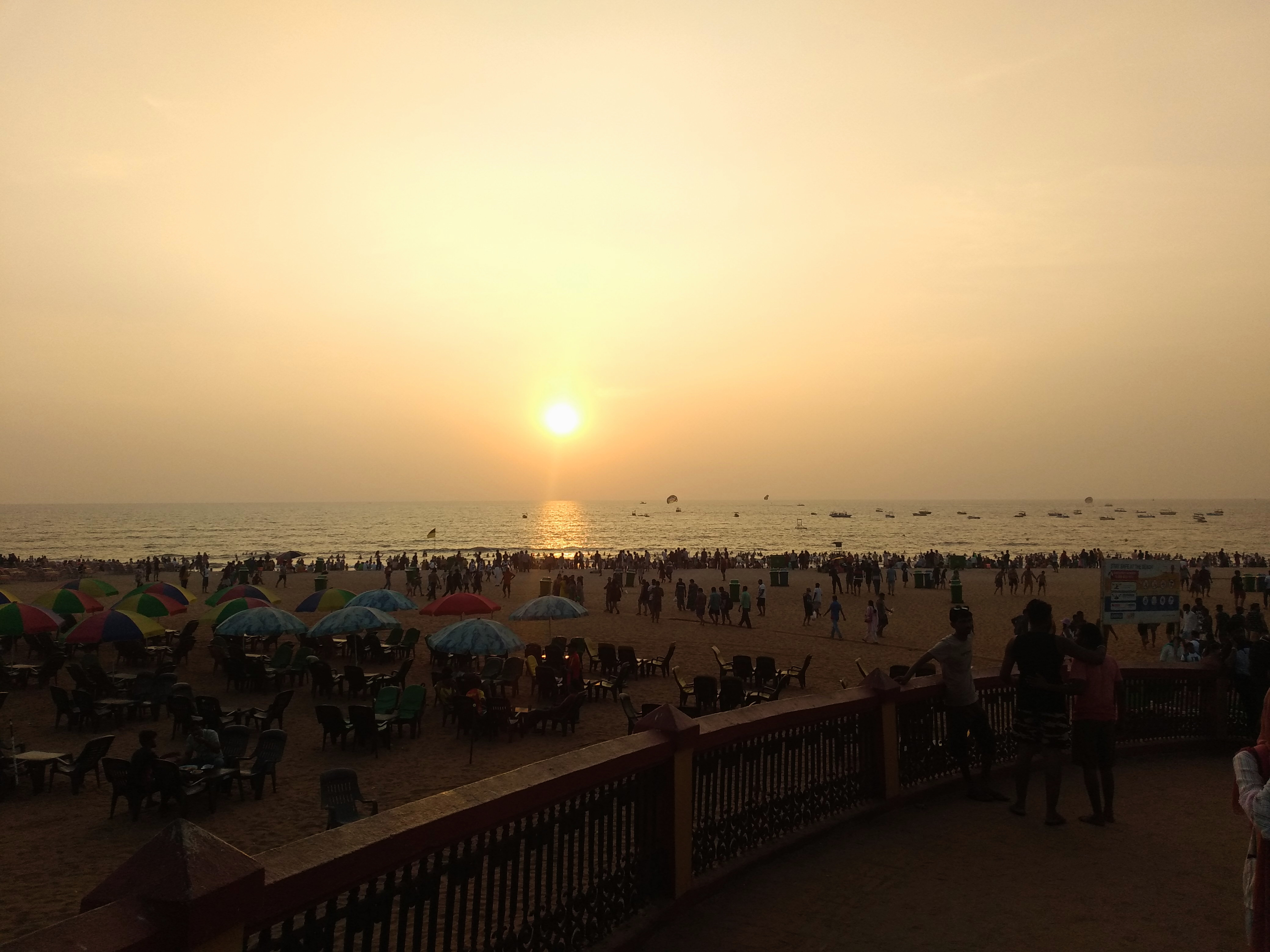
Crowded Calangute Beach in an evening

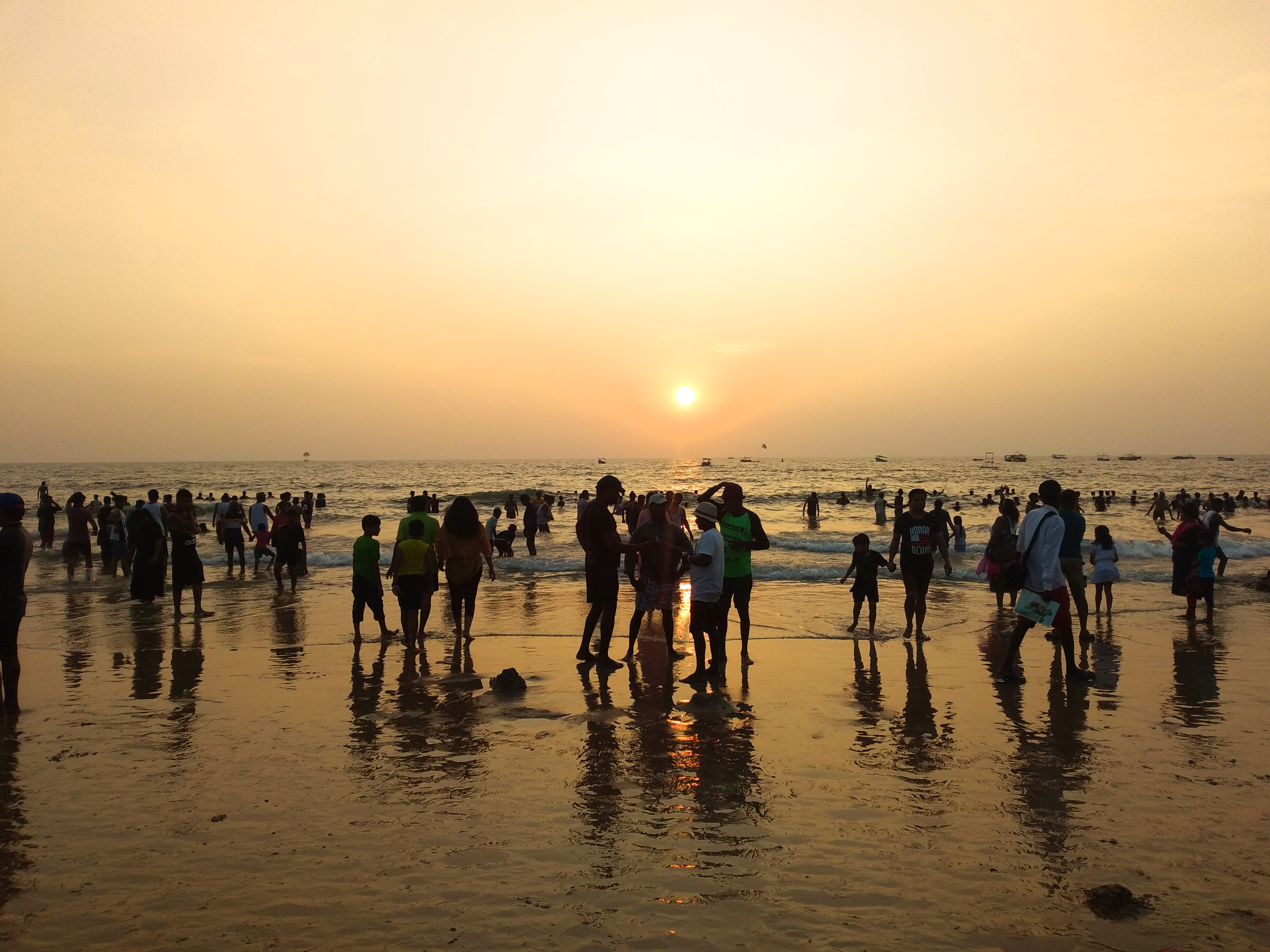
Dusk at Calangute Beach
