= Roman Catholic Diocese of Barisal =

Roman Catholic diocese in Bangladesh

Coordinates: 22.7013°N 90.3704°E

Diocese of Barisal Diœcesis Barisal বরিশাল ধর্মপ্রদেশ

Location
- Country: Bangladesh
- Ecclesiastical province: Chittagong
- Metropolitan: Chittagong

Statistics
- Area: 20,708 km^{2} (7,995 sq mi)
- Population: Total; Catholics: (as of 2015); 15,183,927; 29,685 (0.2%)
- Parishes: 5

Information
- Sui iuris church: Latin Church
- Rite: Roman Rite
- Established: 2015; 11 years ago
- Cathedral: St. Peter's Cathedral, Barisal
- Secular priests: 19

Current leadership
- Pope: Leo XIV
- Bishop: Emmanuel Kanon Rozario

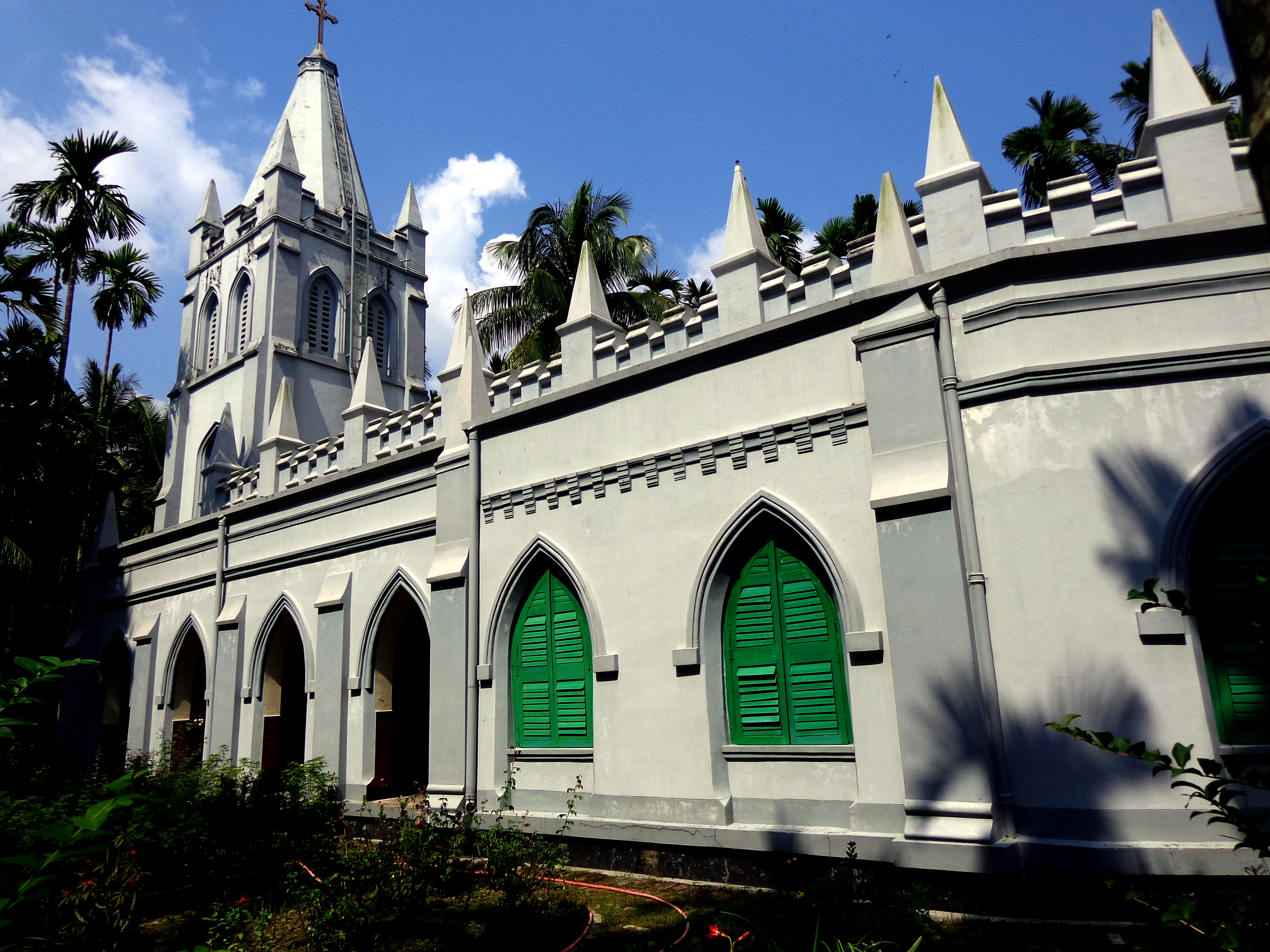
St. Peter's Cathedral, Barisal in Bangladesh

There is also a Diocese of Barisal (and a Bishop of Barisal) in the united Church of Bangladesh.

The Roman Catholic Diocese of Barisal is a Latin suffragan bishopric in the ecclesiastical province of the Metropolitan of Roman Catholic Archdiocese of Chittagong. However it remains dependent on the missionary Roman Congregation for the Evangelization of Peoples.

Its cathedral episcopal see is St. Peter's Cathedral, in Barisal.

== Statistics ==
As per 2015, it pastorally served 29,685 Catholics (0.2% of 15,183,927 total) on 20,708 km^{2} in 5 parishes with 19 priests (13 diocesan, 6 religious), 33 lay religious (4 brothers, 29 sisters) and 3 seminarians.

== History ==
Established on 29 December 2015 as Diocese of Barisal, on territory split off from Diocese of Chittagong, suffragan of the Metropolitan Archdiocese of Dhaka.

Since Chittagong was promoted to Metropolitan Archdiocese in February 2017, Barisal become one of its two original suffragans.

== Episcopal ordinaries ==
(all Latin Church, so far members of Latin missionary congregations)

Suffragan Bishops of Barisal

- Lawrence Subrata Howlader, Holy Cross Fathers (C.S.C.) (2015.12.29 – 2021.02.19); previously Titular Bishop of Afufenia (2009.05.07 – 2015.12.29) & Auxiliary Bishop of mother diocese Chittagong
- Emmanuel Kanon Rozario (2022.06.21 – ...)

== Sources and external links ==
- catholic-hierarchy
- GCatholic
