= Presbyterian Church of India =

Protestant church

Presbyterian Church of India
- Classification: Protestant
- Orientation: Presbyterian
- Scripture: Protestant Bible
- Theology: Reformed
- Polity: Presbyterian
- Moderator: Rev. John Raldosanga
- Associations: World Communion of Reformed Churches, Council for World Mission, National Council of Churches in India
- Region: India
- Founder: Thomas Jones; D. E. Jones
- Origin: 1841; 185 years ago India
- Branched from: Presbyterian Church of Wales formerly Welsh Calvinistic Methodist Church
- Congregations: 4,054 (2025)
- Members: 1,605,423 (2025)

The Presbyterian Church of India (PCI) is a mainline Protestant church based in India, with over 1.6 million adherents, mostly in Northeast India. It is one of the largest Christian denominations in that region.

== Origin and history ==
In 1799, Serampore was a protectorate of Denmark. The early British rulers of India were not in favour of Christian missionaries being active in India, but William Carey (1761–1834) established a mission at Serampore in 1799 which became known as the cradle of Modern Missions. Two Khasi were converted through the ministry of Krishna Chandra Pal, who was deputised by William Carey in 1813, and worked at the trading outpost of Pandua, situated in the Sylhet Plains. The same year a mission station was opened at Jowai in the Jaintia Hills. William Carey, heartened by the efforts of Krishna Pal, began a translation of the Bible into Khasi using Bengali script. In 1832 Carey sponsored Alexander B. Lish as a missionary at Sohra. Lish stayed six years, learning the language, opening schools, and translating the New Testament into Khasi, using Bengali script. This script was unknown to the Khasi at that time, which perhaps accounts, in part, for Lish's lack of converts. So began the history of the missionary efforts of the Welsh in Khasiland. The Secretary of the Welsh Mission, the Reverend John Thomas Jones from Aberriw in Wales who had a strong desire to work in India had applied to the LMS on medical grounds. Reverend Jones managed to obtain support from his congregation and incorporated The Welsh Missionary Society and they sent him to work in the Khasi Hills

The Foreign Missions enterprise of the Welsh Calvinistic Methodist Church (later known as the Presbyterian Church of Wales) began at Liverpool in 1840. Earlier this church had supported the work of the London City Missionary Society both in terms of home support and also in overseas agency—four Calvinistic Methodists were sent out by the LMS in the years up to 1840. However, there arose a feeling among Welsh Calvinists, especially those in North Wales, that the Welsh Calvinists were not being sufficiently represented in the LMS and that, moreover, the Methodist churches had not done what they ought to have done in evangelising the Heathen world. A former London City Missionary by the name of Jacob Tomlin had toured the Khasi Hills before 1840 and recommended that the Welsh Calvinists adopt this area as its first mission. The area had been brought under British domination with a military station at Sohra. In 1874 the Khasi and Jaintia Hills and the plains of Assam were designated the Province of Assam. The first missionary, Rev. Thomas Jones, left with his wife for Sohra in November 1840. They arrived at the reputedly rainiest plain on earth in June 1841. The Rev. Jones learned the Khasi language and after one year opened schools with his publication: First Khasi Reader. The Reverend was aided by a number of other Welsh missionary workers and the first two converts to the Christian faith from Khasiland were baptised in March 1846.

The Presbyterian Church in India was founded in 1841. by missionaries from the Presbyterian Church of Wales (formerly the Calvinistic Methodist Church). Rev Thomas Jones and his wife arrived in Sohra and from the town, this work spread to Sylhet today known as Bangladesh and Cachar Plains, Assam, Mizoram, Manipur and Tripura. But before this around 1813 the Serampore Mission stated working in at the foot of the Khasi Hills. This mission closed in 1838, the Welsh missionaries revived this effort. Rev. William Pyrse arrived to strengthen this work. The first Presbytery was formed in 1867 in Khasi Hills, and 5 presbyteries were established in 1895, resulting in 1896 in what was then called the Assembly. Work was started in 1896 in Sylhet and Cachar, and later another Assembly was formed in there. In 1947 India and Pakistan were divided, the greater part of the area came under Pakistan, the Pakistan Assembly discontinued. In India the Welsh reached Mizoram, and was strengthen by another missionaries, and the work developed since 1897. By the end of the 1890s the church grew in membership and character, this was the Welsh religious revival, and includes today the whole population. Various tribes in north Cachar Hills who had been evangelizedby missionaries and local workers were organised as an Assembly, but this assemblies were just regional, not the whole Presbyterian denomination was included. The Synod of the Presbyterian Church of Assam was created in 1926. The highest church court, the Synod was renamed to Assembly in 1956. In 1968 the name Presbyterian Church in Assam was changed to the Presbyterian Church in North-East India. Geographical spread and the merger of several (though not all) Presbyterian groups made the original denominational names obsolete, and the name 'Presbyterian Church of India' (PCI) was adopted as an official name in 1992, the Assembly was renamed to General Assembly by the highest court of the church in 2002.

== Structure ==
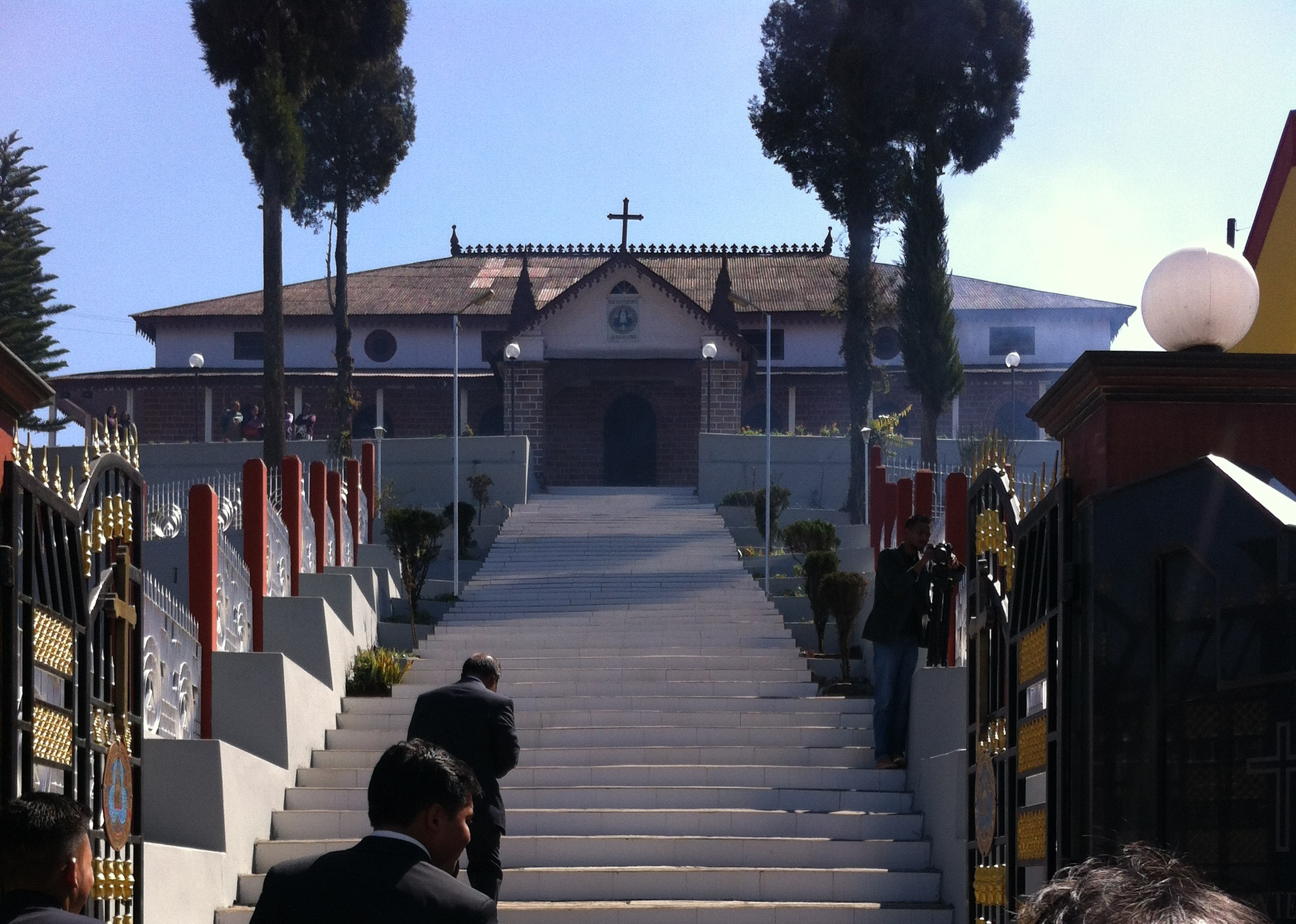
Jowai Presbyterian Church, India

PCI is an apex body comprising thirteen synods:

- Biateram Presbyterian Synod
- Cachar Hill Tribes Presbyterian Synod
- Karbi Anglong Presbyterian Church Synod
- Khasi Jaintia Presbyterian Synod Mihngi
- Khasi Jaintia Presbyterian Synod Sepngi
- Manipur Presbyterian Church Synod
- Meitei Presbyterian Singlup Synod
- Mizoram Presbyterian Church Synod
- Ri Bhoi Presbyterian Synod
- Tripura Presbyterian Church Synod
- Zou Presbyterian Church Synod
- Khasi Jainta Presbyterian Church Synod Pdeng
- Tangphai Presbyterian Church Synod

== Doctrine and theology ==
The PCI subscribes to the Westminster Confession of Faith and maintains relationships with related denominations such as the Presbyterian Church of Korea (TongHap), the Uniting Church in Australia, the Presbyterian Church in Taiwan and the Presbyterian Church in Singapore. It has a cordial relationship with its parent church, the Presbyterian Church of Wales. Locally, it has ties with the Council of Baptist Churches in North-East India (CBCNEI) and the Church of North India.

== Founders ==
Rev. & Mrs. Thomas Jones from the Welsh Presbyterian Church arrived in the Khasi Hills on 22 June 1841. By 1901 there were over 15,000 Christians in this area. The Rev. D.E Jones began working among Mizo people in 1897, and a century later, over 85% of people in Mizoram were Christian.

Many other Presbyterian missionaries also served in India, for example Samuel H. Kellogg, translator of the Bible into Hindi.

== Recent issues ==
The PCI began a partnership with the Presbyterian Church (USA) in 1999. This cooperation was dissolved in 2012 when the PC(USA) voted to ordain openly gay clergy to the ministry. However, since PC(USA) is listed as a partner church on the PCI homepage, it is presumed that they are still cooperating at the PCI level.

== Membership and statistics ==
According to 2018 statistics, the Presbyterian Church of India had a total strength of 1,467,529 members (856,094 communicants) and 3,269 local churches, 11 synods and 137 presbyteries and 1,089 ministers and more than 3,046 mission field workers. The Mizoram Presbyterian Church Synod is the largest with 611,241 members in 54 presbyteries, which has its headquarters in Aizawl, India. This Synod has 14 departments and 560 active ministers. The Khasi Jaintia Presbyterian Synod Sepngi has 381,808 members in 780 churches and 28 presbyteries.

Sl. No.	Synod	Churches	Members
1.	Mizoram Presbyterian Church Synod	1,266	611,241
2.	Khasi Jaintia Presbyterian Synod Sepngi	854	370,764
3.	Khasi Jaintia Presbyterian Synod Mihngi	576	294,320
4.	Ri Bhoi Presbyterian Synod		70,013
5.	Cachar Hill Tribes Presbyterian Synod		34,153
6.	Karbi Anglong Presbyterian Church Synod	62	22,952
7.	Tripura Presbyterian Church Synod	325	22,277
8.	Biateram Presbyterian Synod	70	18,971
9.	Manipur Presbyterian Church Synod	110	15,571
10.	Zou Presbyterian Church Synod	82	12,029
11.	Meitei Presbyterian Singlup Synod	85	8,785

In 2020, the denomination reported having 1,576,830 members, 4,013 churches, and 1,245 ministers.

== Affiliations ==
- National Council of Churches in India (NCCI) : A member.
- Council for World Mission (CWM) - a member.
- World Communion of Reformed Churches (WCRC) - a member

== See also ==
- North East India Christian Council
- Council of Baptist Churches in Northeast India
- List of Christian denominations in North East India
