= St. Francis Xavier Cathedral, Agartala =

St. Francis Xavier Cathedral
- Location within Tripura
- 23.87°N 91.280°E
- Location: Agartala
- Country: India
- Denomination: Roman Catholic Church

The St. Francis Xavier Cathedral also called Agartala Cathedral Is a Church that serves as the episcopal seat of the diocese of Agartala which is located in the city of Agartala in the state of Tripura in the north part of the Asian country of India.

Initiated in October 2010, with a plan that consisted of a planned construction for three years, which was completed two years later, in September of the year 2015, partly due to the special characteristics to resist earthquakes which involved additional work in the construction of the foundations. The church was officially blessed and dedicated by Cardinal Patrick D'Rozario in April 2017.

The church is contemporary in style influenced by local forms, especially on the deck

The interior of the church is a nave with side aisles and balconies at the top and an apse at the end of the nave in which the main altar is located. Behind the apse is the sacristy.

== See also ==
- Roman Catholicism in India
