= Diocese of Agartala =

Latin Catholic diocese in Tripura, India

Diocese of Agartala Dioecesis Agartalana আগরতলা এর বিশপের এলাকা

Catholic

Location
- Country: India
- Ecclesiastical province: Shillong
- Metropolitan: Shillong
- Headquarters: Agartala
- Coordinates: 23°52′23″N 91°16′45″E

Statistics
- Area: 10,491 km^{2} (4,051 sq mi)
- Population: Total; Catholics: (as of 2020); 4,291,490; 48,747 (1.1%)
- Parishes: 24
- Churches: 12 missions

Information
- Denomination: Catholic Church
- Sui iuris church: Latin Church
- Rite: Roman Rite
- Established: 11 January 1996 (30 years ago)
- Cathedral: St. Francis Xavier Cathedral, Agartala, Church of Shantir Rani (former cathedral)
- Patron saint: St. Francis Xavier
- Secular priests: 84

Current leadership
- Pope: Leo XIV
- Bishop: Lumen Monteiro, C.S.C.
- Metropolitan Archbishop: Victor Lyngdoh
- Vicar General: Fr. Lancy D'Souza, C.S.C.

Website
- www.agartaladiocese.org

The Diocese of Agartala (Latin: Dioecesis Agartalana) is a Latin Catholic diocese comprising the entire State of Tripura in the ecclesiastical province of Shillong in India. The cathedral is St. Francis Xavier Cathedral in Agartala.

== History ==
The early beginnings of the Christian community go back to many centuries. Fr. Ignatius Gomes, a Jesuit priest, made the first reference to the Christians of Mariamnagar in Agartala when he visited them in 1683 says Historian Dr. David Syiemlieh. So Christianity had been here at least from the 17th century? About 200 years later Fr. P. Barbe CSC, the Pastor of Chittagong, visited Tripura in 1843 and he would have come here to minister to the Catholic community opines Dr. Syiemileh. Holy Cross pioneering missionaries Fr. Louis Augustine Verite and Fr. Beboit Adolphe Mercier had visited Agartala in 1856 and administered Sacraments to the Christians in Mariamnagar Village. But it was only from 1937 that priests began to take up permanent residence at Mariamnagar. The first Parish in Tripura was erected at Mariamnagar in 1939 and the first permanent Church was blessed in 1952. Because of its geographical proximity, the Archdiocese of Dhaka would continue to cater to the spiritual needs of the Catholics in Tripura till the erection of the new Ecclesiastical Unit in 1952, namely, the Prefecture of Haflong, when Msgr. George Breen, CSC, was appointed the Prefect Apostolic. In 1969, the Prefecture was upgraded to the position of a Diocese and Most Rev. Denzil D’Souza, was elected the first Bishop of Silchar. At that time the Diocese comprised the States of Mizoram and Tripura and the two Districts of Cachar in Assam.

In Venerabiles Fratres Nostri dated 11 January 1996, Pope John Paul II decreed the erection of the Diocese of Agartala. The new Diocese of Agartala, which comprised the whole State of Tripura, was bifurcated from the Diocese of Silchar. The new Diocese of Agartala was made a suffragan diocese of the Archdiocese of Shillong. Fr. Lumen Monteiro, a Holy Cross priest, was appointed as the first Bishop of the new Diocese of Agartala and was consecrated and installed on 26 May 1996. The function was held at Holy Cross School Grounds Agartala, at which the Metropolitan Archbishop of Shillong, Most Rev. Tarcisus Resto Phanrang, SDB, presided over the Episcopal Consecration, which was attended by many Bishops and a huge congregation of people from India and abroad. The Diocese of Agartala is dedicated to Christ the Light of the World with its motto: LEAD US ONWARD (Duc in Altum). The Patron of the Diocese is St. Francis Xavier.

== Leadership ==
- Bishop Lumen Monteiro, C.S.C., (11 January 1996 – Incumbent)

== See also ==
- Christianity in Tripura
- Tripura Baptist Christian Union
- Tripura Presbyterian Church Synod
