= Diocese of Aizawl =

Roman Catholic diocese in Assam & Mizoram, India

Coordinates: 9.4965°N 76.3289°E

Diocese of Aizawl Dioecesis Aizavlen
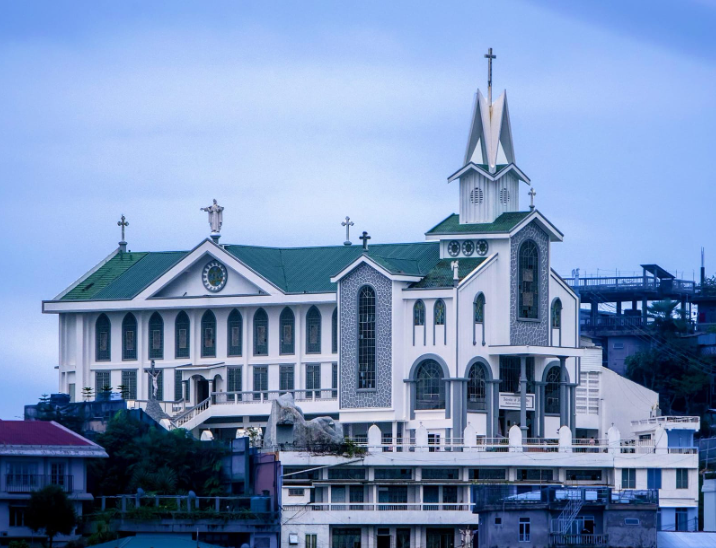
- Christ the King Cathedral in Aizawl

Location
- Country: India
- Ecclesiastical province: Shillong
- Metropolitan: Shillong

Statistics
- Area: 28,002 km^{2} (10,812 sq mi)
- Population: Total; Catholics: (as of 2020); 5,072,598; 41,067 (0.8%)
- Parishes: 32

Information
- Rite: Latin Rite
- Established: 11 January 1996; 30 years ago
- Cathedral: Christ the King Cathedral in Aizawl
- Patron saint: St. Joseph
- Secular priests: 80

Current leadership
- Pope: Leo XIV
- Bishop: Stephen Rotluanga, C.S.C.
- Metropolitan Archbishop: Victor Lyngdoh
- Auxiliary Bishops: Joachim Walder
- Vicar General: Fr. Joseph Lalbiakthanga

Website
- Website of the Diocese

The Roman Catholic Diocese of Aizawl (Latin: Aizavlen(sis)) is a diocese located in the city of Aizawl in the ecclesiastical province of Shillong in India.

== History ==
- 17 January 1952: Established as Apostolic Prefecture of Haflong from the Metropolitan Archdiocese of Dacca
- 26 June 1969: Promoted as Diocese of Silchar
  - 11 January 1996: Renamed as Diocese of Aizawl

== Leadership ==
- Bishops of Aizawl (Latin Rite)
  - Bishop Stephen Rotluanga, C.S.C. (2 October 2001 – present)
  - Apostolic Administrator - Bishop Lumen Monteiro (2000–2001)
  - Bishop Denzil Reginald D’Souza (11 January 1996 – 18 October 2000)
- Bishops of Silchar (Latin Rite)
  - Bishop Denzil Reginald D’Souza (26 June 1969 – 11 January 1996)
- Prefect Apostolic of Haflong (Roman Rite)
  - Fr. George Daniel Breen, C.S.C. (21 March 1952 – 1969)

== See also ==
- List of Christian denominations in North East India
- List of Roman Catholic dioceses in India
