= Denzil Reginald D'Souza =

Indian clergyman and bishop

- Bishop of Aizawl
- Church: Catholic Church
- Diocese: Diocese of Aizawl
- In office: 26 June 1969 – 18 October 2000
- Predecessor: George Daniel Joseph Breen
- Successor: Stephen Rotluanga

Orders
- Ordination: 13 May 1955
- Consecration: 23 November 1969 by Lawrence Picachy

Personal details
- Born: 2 July 1929 Calcutta, Presidency of Fort William in Bengal, British Raj, British Empire
- Died: 25 October 2002 (aged 73)

Denzil Reginald D'Souza (2 July 1929 – 25 October 2002) was an Indian clergyman and bishop for the Catholic Diocese of Aizawl. D'Souza was born in Kolkata. He became ordained in 1955. He was appointed bishop in 1969. He died on 25 October 2002, at the age of 73.
