= Moses Costa =

Bangladeshi Roman Catholic prelate (1950–2020)

The Most Reverend Moses M. Costa C.S.C.
- Archbishop Emeritus of Chittagong
- Archdiocese: Chattogram
- See: Chittagong
- Appointed: 2 February 2017
- Installed: 2 February 2017
- Term ended: 13 July 2020
- Other post: Secretary General of Catholic Bishops' Conference of Bangladesh
- Previous post: Bishop of Chittagong

Orders
- Ordination: 5 February 1981
- Consecration: 6 September 1996 by Adriano Bernardini

Personal details
- Born: 17 November 1950 Dhaka, Bangladesh
- Died: 13 July 2020 (aged 69) Square Hospital, Dhaka, Bangladesh
- Motto: Joy of Communion in Contemplation and Service

Styles of Moses M. Costa, C.S.C.
- Reference style: The Most Reverend
- Spoken style: Your Excellency
- Religious style: Monsignor

Moses M. Costa, C.S.C. (17 November 1950 – 13 July 2020) was a Bangladeshi Roman Catholic prelate, who served as the archbishop of the Roman Catholic Archdiocese of Chittagong, Bangladesh. until his death on 13 July 2020.

== Early life ==
Costa was born on 17 November 1950 in Dhaka, Bangladesh.

== Priesthood ==
Costa was ordained a holy priest of the Congregation of Holy Cross on 5 February 1981.

== Episcopate ==
On 5 July 1996, Costa was appointed bishop of the Roman Catholic Diocese of Dinajpur and consecrated on 6 September 1996 by Adriano Bernardini. On 6 April 2011, he was appointed bishop of the Roman Catholic Archdiocese of Chittagong and was installed on 27 May 2011. He was appointed Archbishop of the Roman Catholic Archdiocese of Chittagong on 2 February 2017 by Pope Francis.

== Health and death ==
On 13 June 2020, Costa was admitted to hospital after testing positive for COVID-19, but later recovered from the disease. On 9 July 2020, Costa suffered a stroke and was put on life support two days later.

He died on 13 July 2020, aged 70, due to complications of the stroke and post Covid-19 complications.
