= Badarpur, Bangladesh =

Badarpur
- Location in Bangladesh
- Coordinates: 22°25′N 90°21′E
- Country: Bangladesh
- Division: Barisal Division
- District: Patuakhali District
- Time zone: UTC+6 (Bangladesh Time)
- Postal code: 8601

Badarpur village is located at Patuakhali District in the Barisal Division of south Bangal, Bangladesh.
