= August 2005 in sports =

<<	August 2005					>>
Su	Mo	Tu	We	Th	Fr	Sa
	1	2	3	4	5	6
7	8	9	10	11	12	13
14	15	16	17	18	19	20
21	22	23	24	25	26	27
28	29	30	31
India; Sports

This list shows notable sports-related deaths, events, and notable outcomes that occurred in August of 2005.

== Deaths ==
- 28 Annie L. Smith
- 21 Thomas Herrion
- 16 Alexander Gomelsky
- 14 Coo Coo Marlin
- 11 Ted Radcliffe
- 8 Gene Mauch
- 5 Polina Astakhova

== Ongoing events ==
- 2005 English cricket season
- 2005 ICC Intercontinental Cup
- 2005 in NASCAR
- 2005 in IRL
- 2005–06 FA Premiership
- 2005–06 in English football
- 2005–06 in Scottish football
- 2005 in Swedish football
- 2005–06 Hyundai A-League (Australia)
- 2005–06 UEFA Champions League
- 2005 AFL finals series (Australia)
- 2005 NRL Finals Series (Australia)
- 5 June–12 September: Cricket: The Ashes tour
- 4 August–6 September: Cricket: New Zealand tour of Zimbabwe
- 26 August–6 September: Cricket: Videocon Tri-Series in Zimbabwe
- 27 August–18 September: Cycling: Vuelta a España
- 29 August–11 September: Tennis: US Open
- 2 September–24 September: Australian football: AFL finals series
- 9 September–2 October: rugby league: NRL Finals Series

== 31 August 2005 (Wednesday) ==
- Baseball: Jeremy Hermida of the Florida Marlins becomes the second player in Major League Baseball history to hit a grand slam in his first major league at bat. It had only previously been done in 1899 by pitcher Bill Duggleby. The Marlins nonetheless lose 10–5 to the St. Louis Cardinals.
- Cricket
  - Videocon Tri-Series: New Zealand (238, Styris 63, Astle 61; Blignaut 4–46; Ewing 3–31) beat Zimbabwe (211, Blignaut 50; Bond 4–17) by 27 runs. New Zealand qualify for the final. (Cricinfo)
  - Bangladeshi tour of Sri Lanka: Sri Lanka (269 for 9, Tharanga 60, Jayawardene 50) beat Bangladesh (181 for 9, Maharoof 3–29) by 88 runs. (Cricinfo)

== 30 August 2005 (Tuesday) ==
- Football
  - England striker Michael Owen signs a four-year deal to move to Newcastle United from Real Madrid, for a reported transfer fee of £17 million.

== 29 August 2005 (Monday) ==
- Football:
  - Italian referee Pierluigi Collina, widely regarded as the best referee in the world, announces his retirement following a dispute with the Italian Football Federation (FIGC). The dispute centred on Collina's decision to accept a sponsorship deal with Opel, who also sponsor Serie A side A.C. Milan. The deal was seen as a major conflict of interests by the FIGC and Collina was demoted to refereeing Serie B matches, in response to this Collina handed in his resignation, ending his career. BBC
- Cricket, Videocon Tri-Series:
  - India (226 for 6, Kaif 65, Dhoni 56, Yuvraj 53*; Ireland 3–54) beat Zimbabwe (65, Pathan 5–27, Agarkar 4–18) by 161 runs. (Cricinfo)

== 28 August 2005 (Sunday) ==
- Auto racing:
  - IRL: Tony Kanaan wins the Argent Mortgage Indy Grand Prix, his second victory of the year. Points leader Dan Wheldon was hampered by fuel problems and finished out of the race in 18th.
  - Champ Car: Oriol Servia wins his first series victory in the Molson Champ Car race in Montreal, Quebec after officials order rookie Timo Glock to let him pass on the final lap for illegally blocking another car.
- Baseball: 2005 Little League World Series Championship Game
  - West Oahu from Ewa Beach, Hawai'i comes from behind with a three-run sixth inning and then wins the first extra-inning game since 1971, defeating Willemstead, Curaçao 7–6 in seven innings. Michael Memea's walk-off home run provided the difference, preventing the defending champions from repeating their attempt to repeat what the Long Beach, California team did in 1992 and 1993. Rancho Buena Vista, California defeated Chiba City, Japan by a 5–4 score to win the consolation game.
- Cricket: The Ashes, fourth test at Trent Bridge, Nottingham
  - England (477 & 129–7) defeat Australia (218 & 387) by three wickets to take a 2–1 series lead with one Test remaining. After following-on Australia set England a target of 129, England survived a bowling onslaught from Shane Warne (4–31) and Brett Lee (3–51) to gain the upper hand in the series. (BBC)
- Football
  - La Liga
    - Sevilla 1–0 Racing de Santander
    - Espanyol 0–2 Getafe
    - Celta Vigo 2–0 Málaga
    - Osasuna 2–1 Villarreal
    - Mallorca 0–1 Deportivo de La Coruña
    - Atlético Madrid 0–0 Real Zaragoza
    - Cádiz 1–2 Real Madrid
  - Serie A
    - Udinese 1–0 Empoli
    - Lazio 1–0 Messina
    - Parma 1–1 Palermo
    - Reggina 0–3 AS Roma
    - Siena 2–1 Cagliari
    - Inter Milan 3–0 Treviso
    - Ascoli 1–1 A.C. Milan
    - Juventus 1–0 Chievo Verona
  - FA Premier League
    - Middlesbrough 0–3 Charlton Athletic
    - Newcastle 0–3 Man United

== 27 August 2005 (Saturday) ==
- Auto racing: NASCAR Nextel Cup Sharpie 500: Matt Kenseth wins from the pole.
- Cricket: The Ashes, fourth Test at Trent Bridge
  - England, who scored a first innings of 477, bowl Australia out for 218 and captain Michael Vaughan enforces the follow-on, the first time Australia has followed on since 1988. The third day ends with Australia at 222–4 and 37 runs away from forcing England to bat again. (BBC)
- Football:
  - Spanish Premier League Opening Day Matches
    - Alavés 0–0 Barcelona
    - Valencia 1–0 Real Betis
    - Athletic Bilbao 3–0 Real Sociedad
  - Serie A: Opening Day Matches
    - Livorno 2–1 Lecce
    - Fiorentina 2–1 Sampdoria
  - FA Premier League
    - Tottenham Hotspur 0–2 Chelsea
    - West Bromwich Albion 2–3 Birmingham City
    - West Ham United 1–2 Bolton Wanderers
    - Aston Villa 1–0 Blackburn Rovers
    - Man City 2–1 Portsmouth
    - Fulham 1–0 Everton
    - Wigan Athletic 1–0 Sunderland: The Latics secure their first Premiership victory when Jason Roberts converts a penalty in the second minute.
    - Liverpool v Arsenal was postponed due to Liverpool's participation in the European Super Cup.
- rugby league: Rugby League Challenge Cup Final
  - Leeds Rhinos 24–25 Hull
- Rugby union:
  - In the penultimate match of the Tri Nations Series in Dunedin, the All Blacks (New Zealand) use a late try from Keven Mealamu to edge the Springboks (South Africa), the defending Tri Nations champions, 31–27. This maintains the All Blacks' unbeaten record against the Springboks at Carisbrook. Joe Rokocoko adds two tries for the All Blacks, who can secure the Tri Nations crown by defeating the Australia Wallabies next week. (BBC)

== 26 August 2005 (Friday) ==
- Football:
  - UEFA Super Cup
    - Liverpool 3–1 CSKA Moscow (aet)
      - Djibril Cissé scored twice as a substitute — a game-tying goal in the 81st minute and the winning goal in the 103rd minute — to lead the UEFA Champions League titleholders past the winners of the UEFA Cup at Stade Louis II in Monaco. Cissé also assisted on the team's final goal, a header by Luis García in the 112th minute. UEFA web site
  - Domestic Leagues
    - The inaugural Hyundai A-League association football competition kicks-off, heralding a new era in Australian domestic football. (Official Website)

== 25 August 2005 (Thursday) ==
- Cricket: 2005 ICC Intercontinental Cup: Bermuda (30.5pts) beat Canada (17.5pts) by 48 runs in Toronto to go top of the Americas group.
- Baseball: St. Louis Cardinals manager Tony La Russa manages his 2,195th win, passing Sparky Anderson to become the third-winningest manager in the history of Major League Baseball. (ESPN)
- Football:
  - UEFA Champions League: Group stage draw (UEFA.com)
    - Group A: Bayern Munich, Juventus, Club Brugge, Rapid Vienna
    - Group B: Arsenal, Ajax, Sparta Prague, FC Thun
    - Group C: Barcelona, Panathinaikos, Werder Bremen, Udinese
    - Group D: Man United, Villarreal, Lille, Benfica
    - Group E: A.C. Milan, PSV, Schalke, Fenerbahçe
    - Group F: Real Madrid, Lyon, Olympiakos, Rosenborg
    - Group G: Liverpool, Chelsea, Anderlecht, Real Betis
    - Group H: Internazionale, Porto, Rangers, Artmedia
  - UEFA Cup Second Qualifying Round, second leg, Progressing teams shown in **bold**. (UEFA.com)
    - Southern/Mediterranean zone
      - **Red Star Belgrade** 4–0 Inter Zaprešić
      - **Maccabi Petach Tikva** 6–0 FK Baskimi
      - AC Omonia 2–1 **Dinamo București**
      - **Lokomotiv Plovdiv** 1–0 OFK Beograd (away goals)
      - Maccabi Tel Aviv 2–2 **APOEL** (aet)
      - HNK Rijeka 2–1 **Litex Lovech** (away goals)
      - **Beşiktaş** 5–1 FC Vaduz
      - FK Vardar 1–1 **Rapid București**
      - **Levski Sofia** 3–0 NK Publikum
      - **Široki Brijeg** 4–2 FK Zeta
      - **NK Domžale** 1–1 F.C. Ashdod (away goals)
    - Central/Eastern zone
      - BATE Borisov 0–2 **Krylya Sovetov Samara**
      - **Metalurh Donetsk** 2–1 MFC Sopron
      - Wisła Płock 3–2 **Grasshopper** (away goals)
      - **Grazer AK** 1–0 Nistru Otaci
      - **Austria Vienna** 2–2 MŠK Žilina
      - **Zenit St. Petersburg** 1–1 SV Pasching (away goals)
      - **FK Teplice** 2–1 MTZ-RIPO Minsk
      - Dukla Banská Bystrica 0–0 **Dyskobolia Grodzisk Wielkopolski**
      - **Dnipro Dnipropetrovsk** 4–0 FC Banants
      - **FC Zürich** 4–1 Legia Warsaw
    - Northern zone
      - Linfield 2–4 **Halmstads BK**
      - B36 2–2 **Midtjylland**
      - **Allianssi** 0–2 Brann
      - **KRC Genk** 3–0 Liepājas Metalurgs
      - **Viking FK** 2–1 Rhyl
      - Dundee United 2–2 **MyPa** (away goals)
      - Carmarthen Town 0–2 **FC København**
      - Keflavík 0–2 **Mainz 05**
      - **Cork City** 0–0 Djurgårdens IF (away goals)
      - **Tromsø** 0–1 EfB (aet, 3–2 on penalties)

== 24 August 2005 (Wednesday) ==
- Basketball:
  - The University of Cincinnati gave men's basketball head coach Bob Huggins a Wednesday (8/24) 2 p.m. (US EDT) deadline to either resign or be fired. Huggins chose to resign after 16 scandal-filled years with the Bearcats.
- Football:
  - English Premier League: Newcastle United announce that they have agreed a club record fee with Real Madrid for the services of England striker Michael Owen, although they are still to negotiate with the player's advisers. . This comes just a day after Everton, traditional rivals of Owen's former club Liverpool, had a bid for the player turned down by the Spanish club .
    - Arsenal 4–1 Fulham
    - Chelsea 4–0 West Bromwich Albion
    - Blackburn Rovers 0–0 Tottenham Hotspur
    - Bolton Wanderers 2–0 Newcastle United
  - UEFA Champions League 2005–2006, Third Qualifying Round, second leg. Teams progressing to the group stage shown in **bold**.
    - **Club Brugge** 1–0 Vålerenga IF
    - **Rangers** 2–0 Anorthosis Famagusta
    - Debrecen 0–3 **Manchester United**
    - **Villarreal** 2–1 Everton
    - Slavia Praha 0–2 **Anderlecht**
    - **Ajax** 3–1 Brøndby
    - **Werder Bremen** 3–0 FC Basel
    - **Internazionale** 1–1 Shakhtar Donetsk

== 23 August 2005 (Tuesday) ==
- Sports: The NCAA will allow Florida State University to keep their "Seminoles" nickname after the school appealed, citing the cooperation of the tribe in their efforts as part of the school's traditions.
- Football:
  - English Premier League:
    - Birmingham City 0–3 Middlesbrough
    - Portsmouth 1–1 Aston Villa
    - Sunderland 1–2 Manchester City
  - UEFA Champions League 2005–2006, Third Qualifying Round, second leg. Teams progressing to the group stage shown in **bold**. (UEFA.com)
    - AS Monaco 2 – 2 **Real Betis**
    - **Panathinaikos** 4 – 1 Wisła Kraków (a.e.t.)
    - **Udinese** 3 – 2 Sporting Lisbon
    - **FC Thun** 3 – 0 Malmö FF
    - FK Partizan 0 – 0 **Artmedia Bratislava** (a.e.t.) Artmedia win 4–2 on penalties.
    - **Rosenborg** 3 – 2 Steaua Bucharest
    - Lokomotiv Moscow 0 – 1 **Rapid Vienna**
    - **Liverpool** 0 – 1 CSKA Sofia
  - UEFA Intertoto Cup 2005–06, Finals, second leg. Teams progressing to the UEFA Cup shown in **bold**. (UEFA.com)
    - **Lens** 3 – 1 Cluj
    - Valencia 0 – 0 **Hamburg**
    - **Marseille** 5 – 1 Deportivo

== 21 August 2005 (Sunday) ==
- Auto racing:
  - Formula One: Kimi Räikkönen wins the inaugural Turkish Grand Prix from Fernando Alonso and Juan Pablo Montoya. (Formula1.com)
  - NASCAR: Jeremy Mayfield gambles on fuel in the waning laps to win the GFS Marketplace 400 at Michigan International Speedway.
  - IRL: Dan Wheldon wins his fifth race of the season, tying the IRL record for most wins in a season.
- National Football League: San Francisco 49ers guard Thomas Herrion collapses in the locker room and dies about an hour after a preseason game in Denver. The cause of death was not immediately known. (AP)
- Football: English Premier League
- Tennis: Roger Federer wins his eighth ATP Masters Series title by defeating Andy Roddick in the final at the Cincinnati Masters.
  - Bolton Wanderers 0–1 (0–0) Everton: The visitors win the game thanks to the only goal of the game from Marcus Bent in the 52nd minute.
  - Chelsea 1–0 (0–0) Arsenal: Didier Drogba scores in the 73rd minute of the game to secure Chelsea's first win over Arsenal in league play since 1995.
- Cricket:
  - 2005 Afro-Asia Cup: The third ODI of the series between Africa and Asia at Kingsmead is rained off, and the match declared a no-result. The series is drawn one-all. (Cricinfo)
  - Australian Women in England: England Women record their first win over Australia Women since the 1993 World Cup. Chasing 201 to win, Australia were limited to 198 for 7 with two wickets in the final over. Australia lead 2–1 in the 5-ODI series. (Cricinfo)

== 20 August 2005 (Saturday) ==
- Auto racing:
  - Two spectators are killed and six seriously injured, when, during a qualifying run at the Mount Vernon Raceway in Mount Vernon, Illinois, the car of Kevin Beattie has its throttle get stuck, leaving it unable to turn. Beattie's car flies into the stands, leaping over the fence, resulting in the tragedies. (USAToday.com)
- Cricket:
  - 2005 Afro-Asia Cup: Asia XI (267 for 7) beat Africa XI (250) by 17 runs to level the 3-ODI series 1–1. (Cricinfo)
  - 2005 English cricket season: Cheltenham & Gloucester Trophy: Semi-finals:
    - Hampshire (199 for 2) beat Yorkshire (197 for 9) by 8 wickets. (BBC)
    - Warwickshire (236 for 7) beat Lancashire (137) by 99 runs. (BBC)
    - Hampshire will play Warwickshire in the finals on September 3, 2005.
- Boxing:
  - In a fight of former world Jr. Middleweight champions, Fernando Vargas defeats Javier Castillejo by a ten-round unanimous decision.
  - WBO world Jr. Flyweight champion Hugo Cazares retains his title with an eighth-round knockout win over Alex Sánchez, after Sánchez complained of an eye injury. Sánchez later announced his retirement. Fightnews.com
  - Ann Wolfe defeats Valerie Mahfood by a ten-round unanimous decision. Fightnews.com
- College football: The first AP preseason poll ranks USC as the number one team in the nation. They are followed by Texas, Tennessee, Michigan and LSU. (ESPN)
- Baseball: The Kansas City Royals end their 19-game losing streak with a 2–1 victory over the Oakland Athletics. The Royals were two games shy of the Baltimore Orioles' American League record of 21 straight losses, and four losses away from the all-time modern record of 23 set in 1961 by the Philadelphia Phillies. This is Kansas City's first win since July 27. Oakland's lead over the New York Yankees in the American League wild card race drops to half a game. (ESPN)
- Football:
  - English Premiership (Official Premiership site; see "Results" link)
    - Manchester United 1–0 (0–0) Aston Villa
    - Charlton Athletic 1–0 (1–0) Wigan Athletic
    - Newcastle United 0–0 West Ham United
    - West Bromwich Albion 2–1 (1–0) Portsmouth
    - Blackburn Rovers 2–1 (1–0) Fulham
    - Liverpool 1–0 (1–0) Sunderland
    - Tottenham Hotspur 2–0 (0–0) Middlesbrough
    - Birmingham City 1–2 (1–1) Manchester City
- Rugby union: The South Africa Springboks defeat the Australia Wallabies 22–19 at Subiaco Oval in Perth in the fourth match of the Tri Nations Series, the Boks' first win in Australia since 1998. The Australians last lost four consecutive Tests in 1981-82. (BBC)
- 2005 Little League World Series: Kalen Pimentel of Vista, California, representing the West team, strikes out 18 batters in a 6-inning game to lead his team over Owensboro, Kentucky, representing the Great Lakes, 7–2.

== 19 August 2005 (Friday) ==
- Cricket: 2005 English cricket season:
  - NatWest Women's Series: Australia Women (193 for 8) beat England Women (128) by 65 runs in the 2nd One Day International at Kidderminster. (BBC)
  - County Championship, Division One: Surrey (463) drew with Gloucestershire (350 & 294 for 6). (BBC)
  - County Championship, Division Two:
    - Essex (306 & 337 for 5) beat Derbyshire (426 & 216) by 5 wickets. (BBC)
    - Lancashire (537) drew with Yorkshire (417 & 323 for 6). (BBC)
    - Worcestershire (696 for 8 dec.) beat Somerset (318 & 322) by an innings and 56 runs. (BBC)

== 18 August 2005 (Thursday) ==
- Cricket: 2005 English cricket season: Australians in England in 2005: The tour match between Scotland and Australia is abandoned due to bad weather. (BBC)

== 17 August 2005 (Wednesday) ==
- Basketball: The NCAA settles a lawsuit against organizers of the National Invitation Tournament by buying the tournament rights from their current holders, the Metropolitan Intercollegiate Basketball Association, for $56.5 million (US). (Yahoo! Sports via AP)
- Cricket: 2005 English cricket season:
  - National League, Division One: Glamorgan (203 for 5) beat Northamptonshire (201) by 5 wickets. (BBC)
  - County Championship, Division One: Sussex (522) beat Middlesex (128 & 162) by an innings and 232 runs. (BBC)
- Basketball: WNBA: The Los Angeles Sparks fire Henry Bibby as coach, and replace him with Kobe Bryant's father, Joe Bryant.
- 2006 FIFA World Cup Qualifying: Fifteen games on four continents, including the last matchday of group play in Asia. (2006 World Cup Website)
  - Asia
    - Japan 2–1 (1–0) Iran. Both teams had already qualified for the World Cup.
    - South Korea 0–1 (0–1) Saudi Arabia. Both teams had already qualified for the World Cup.
    - Uzbekistan 3–2 (1–2) Kuwait. Down 0–2, Uzbekistan rallies to win the game and 3rd place, earning a spot in a playoff next month against Bahrain. Kuwait is eliminated.
    - Bahrain 2–3 (0–2) North Korea. Before this match, Bahrain had clinched 3rd place in their group, while North Korea had already been eliminated.
    - Bahrain and Uzbekistan will play a home-and-away series next month, with the winner advancing to a playoff against a CONCACAF team.
  - Europe
    - Kazakhstan 1–2 (1–0) Georgia
    - Latvia 1–1 (1–1) Russia
    - Faroe Islands 0–3 (0–1) Cyprus.
    - Macedonia 0–3 (0–2) Finland.
    - Liechtenstein 0–0 Slovakia.
    - Romania 2–0 (2–0) Andorra.
  - Africa: two games, both make-ups of earlier games that were postponed
    - Sudan 1–0 (0–0) Benin.
    - Tunisia 1–0 (1–0) Kenya. Kenya eliminated from contention.
  - CONCACAF
    - United States 1–0 (1–0) Trinidad and Tobago Brian McBride garners the game's only goal in just the second minute. A second goal later in the game, scored by Taylor Twellman, is disallowed after the U.S. was ruled offsides.
    - Guatemala 2–1 (0–1) Panama.
    - Mexico 2–0 (0–0) Costa Rica. Mexico striker Jared Borgetti takes sole possession of the country's all-time goal scoring record in international play.
    - Mexico and the USA now are both assured of finishing no worse than fourth place in the CONCACAF group, which would put that team in a playoff against the Bahrain-Uzbekistan winner for a World Cup place.
- Football: International friendlies
  - Denmark 4–1 (0–0) England. Denmark sends England crashing to their worst defeat in 25 years. England surrender three goals in seven minutes of the second half. (BBC)
  - France 3–0 (1–0) Côte d'Ivoire. In his return from international retirement, Zinedine Zidane scores a goal to help lead France to a confidence-boosting win ahead of September's World Cup qualifiers. (UEFA.com)
  - Netherlands 2–2 (1–0) Germany. Arjen Robben scores twice to stake the Oranje to a 2–0 lead at De Kuip, but Germany fights back behind goals from Michael Ballack and Gerald Asamoah. (UEFA.com)
  - Sweden 2–1 (2–1) Czech Republic. Henrik Larsson returns from a 10-month layoff from international play and scores Sweden's opening goal. (UEFA.com)
  - Croatia 1–1 (1–1) Brazil. (UEFA.com)
  - Spain 2–0 (2–0) Uruguay. (UEFA.com)
  - Portugal 2–0 (0–0) Egypt. (UEFA.com)
  - Republic of Ireland 1–2 (1–2) Italy. Ireland suffers their first home loss since Brian Kerr became manager in 2003. (BBC)
  - Austria 2–2 (0–2) Scotland. (BBC)
  - Wales 0–0 Slovenia. Despite a host of withdrawals, notably of the injured Ryan Giggs and Craig Bellamy, Wales hold on for a deserved draw in the first international in Swansea since 1988. (BBC)
  - Malta 1–1 (1–1) Northern Ireland. (BBC)
  - Norway 0–2 (0–0) Switzerland Norway suffered their first home defeat under the coaching of Åge Hareide. (UEFA.com)

== 16 August 2005 (Tuesday) ==
- Cricket: 2005 English cricket season:
  - County Championship, Division One: Nottinghamshire (514) beat Warwickshire (156 & 207) by an innings and 151 runs. (BBC)
  - National League, Division Two: Durham (116 for 2) beat Leicestershire (113) by 8 wickets. (BBC)

== 15 August 2005 (Monday) ==
- NBA Basketball: The deadline for teams to use the NBA's so-called amnesty clause passes. The amnesty clause allows teams to waive one player to avoid falling under the NBA's luxury tax threshold for payrolls of $61.7 million USD or above. Players cut by this rule today included Dallas Mavericks captain Michael Finley, Jerome Williams of the New York Knicks, Ron Mercer of the New Jersey Nets and Calvin Booth of the Milwaukee Bucks along with the recently retired Indiana Pacers icon Reggie Miller. (ESPN)
- Cricket: 2005 English cricket season:
  - The 2005 Ashes: England (444 & 280 for 6 dec.) drew with Australia (302 & 371 for 9) in the third Test at Old Trafford. (BBC)
  - Natwest Women's Series: Australia Women (222 for 7) beat England Women (210) by 12 runs in the 1st ODI at Cheltenham. (BBC)
  - County Championship, Division One:
    - Hampshire (325 & 241 for 8) drew with Kent (446 & 185). (BBC)
    - Durham (315 & 103 for 2) drew with Leicestershire (443). (BBC)
  - National League, Division One: Northamptonshire (261 for 6) beat Middlesex (247 for 9) by 14 runs. (BBC)
- Golf: US PGA Championship: Phil Mickelson birdied the 18th hole to win the final major of the golf year at Baltusrol Golf Club in Springfield, New Jersey with a four-under par 276. Thomas Bjørn and Steve Elkington finished tied for second, one stroke back. (Official PGA Championship Web Site). Eight of the top 10 finishers were previous winners of a major tournament.

== 14 August 2005 (Sunday) ==
- Cricket: 2005 English cricket season:
  - National League, Division One:
    - Lancashire (176 for 2) beat Glamorgan (173) by 8 wickets. (BBC)
    - Gloucestershire (182) beat Essex (122) by 60 runs. (BBC)
  - National League, Division Two:
    - Derbyshire (232 for 3) beat Sussex (229) by 3 runs. (BBC)
    - Somerset (345 for 4) beat Yorkshire (343 for 9) by 2 runs. (BBC)
- Golf: US PGA Championship: Play was suspended until Monday morning (15 August) at 10 a.m. US EDT due to lightning. When play was halted at 6:25 p.m. US EDT, Phil Mickelson held a one stroke lead at four-under par over Thomas Björn and Steve Elkington. Tiger Woods is tied with Davis Love III and Vijay Singh two strokes back, with Woods finishing early. (Official PGA Championship Web Site)
- Baseball:
  - Rafael Palmeiro returned to the Baltimore Orioles lineup after being suspended for ten games after testing positive for steroids. He was greeted with a mixture of cheers and boos. Palmeiro went 0-for-4 with a walk. (ESPN)
  - Pedro Martínez pitched a no-hitter through seven innings for the New York Mets against the Los Angeles Dodgers, but lost the no-hitter and the game in the eighth as the Dodgers went on to win, 2–1. (ESPN)
- Auto racing
  - NASCAR Nextel Cup: Sirius at The Glen: Tony Stewart wins his second straight race, in a green-white-checkers finish in Watkins Glen, New York. Robby Gordon was second, followed by Boris Said, Scott Pruett (replacing Sterling Marlin, whose father Coo Coo Marlin died earlier today), and Jimmie Johnson to finish the top five. (ESPN)
  - Champ Car World Series: Centrix Grand Prix of Denver: Sébastien Bourdais won his third straight race defending his title on the street circuit in Denver, Colorado. (Official ChampCar website)
  - Indy Racing League: Amber Alert Portal Indy 300: Scott Sharp wins his first race since 2003, holding off Vítor Meira in the final laps to win. (Official IRL website)
- Football:
  - Barclays Premiership:
    - Arsenal 2–0 Newcastle United (Football365)
    - Wigan Athletic 0–1 Chelsea (Football365)
- AFL: Round 20 Results
  - Sydney 19.10 (124) def. Brisbane 6.4 (40) at Telstra Stadium, Sydney
  - Carlton 17.15 (117) def. Essendon 16.8 (104) at the MCG, Melbourne
  - Richmond 16.11 (107) def. by Bulldogs 18.11 (119) at Telstra Dome, Melbourne
- NRL: Round 23 Results
  - Wests Tigers 28 def. North Queensland 16 at Campbelltown Stadium, Sydney
  - St. George Illawarra Dragons 24 def. Brisbane 4 at Suncorp Stadium, Brisbane
  - Newcastle 22 def. Manly 14 at EnergyAustralia Stadium, Newcastle

== 13 August 2005 (Saturday) ==
- Boxing:
  - Ricardo Mayorga wins the vacant WBC world Jr. Middleweight title with a twelve-round decision over former world champion Michele Piccirillo of Italy; former WBC world Heavyweight champion Oliver McCall returns with a fourth-round knockout win over Poland's Przemyslaw Saleta, and Puerto Rico's Luis Collazo retains his WBA world Welterweight title, with an eighth-round knockout over former world Lightweight champion Miguel Ángel González of Mexico. All fights are part of a boxing show in Chicago. AOL
- Cricket: 2005 English cricket season:
  - County Championship, Division One: Middlesex (325 & 385 for 4 dec.) drew with Nottinghamshire (181 & 128–1). (BBC)
  - County Championship, Division Two:
    - Northamptonshire (140 & 466 for 6 dec.) beat Derbyshire (219 & 204) by 182 runs. (BBC)
    - Yorkshire (406 & 179 for 4) drew with Somerset (581). (BBC)
- Golf: US PGA Championship: Davis Love III and second-round leader Phil Mickelson are tied for the lead after three rounds at six-under par. Thomas Björn is one shot behind, with Pat Pérez, defending champion Vijay Singh, Stuart Appleby and Steve Elkington two shots behind. Tiger Woods is at even par. (Official PGA Championship Website)
- Football:
  - 2005–06 Barclays Premiership Opening Day Results Barclays Premiership Website:
    - Everton 0–2 Manchester United
    - Aston Villa 2–2 Bolton Wanderers
    - Fulham 0–0 Birmingham City
    - Manchester City 0–0 West Bromwich Albion
    - Portsmouth 0–2 Tottenham Hotspur
    - Sunderland 1–3 Charlton Athletic
    - West Ham United 3–1 Blackburn Rovers
    - Middlesbrough 0–0 Liverpool
- Rugby union:
  - In the third match of the Tri Nations Series from Telstra Stadium in Sydney, the All Blacks (New Zealand) roar back from a 13–0 first-half deficit to defeat the Australia Wallabies 30–13. The away win, the first in the Tri Nations since 2003, assures New Zealand will retain the Bledisloe Cup. The one dark spot for the All Blacks is the stretchering off of star fly-half Dan Carter late in the second half. (BBC) Update: Carter suffered a broken leg and may be out as long as three months. (BBC)

== 12 August 2005 (Friday) ==
- Cricket:
  - 2005 English cricket season:
    - County Championship, Division One:
      - Warwickshire (545 for 7 dec. & 3 for 0) beat Glamorgan (239 & 308) by 10 wickets. (BBC)
      - Sussex (365 & 264 for 5 dec.) beat Gloucestershire (224 & 179) by 226 runs. (BBC)
    - Bangladesh A in England in 2005: Surrey (336 for 5 dec. & 332 for 6 dec.) drew with Bangladesh A (336 & 113 for 1) in the second Tour match at the Oval. (BBC)
    - Australian Women in England in 2005: England Women (273 & 172 for 7) drew with Australia Women (355 & 223) in the first Test at Hove. (BBC)
    - Sri Lanka Under-19s in England in 2005: England Under 19 (294 & 280) beat Sri Lanka Under 19 (227 & 164) by 183 runs in the second 'Test' at Scarborough, taking an unassailable 2–0 lead in the series. (BBC)
- Athletics: World Championships: Totally outperforming the competition, Yelena Isinbayeva of Russia betters the world record in women's pole vault by 1 centimetre, to 5.01 m, winning the gold medal in the Championship event in Helsinki. Isinbayeva also had the previous world record, set only three weeks ago in London. (IAAF Website)
- Golf: US PGA Championship: Phil Mickelson shot a five-under par 65 to take the lead after two rounds of the 2005 PGA Championship, the final major on the golf calendar. Play was delayed on the fourth hole when a branch of a tree fell following the group with Tiger Woods teeing off, injuring three people, including two CBS Sports employees, one of them with a broken leg. Woods will make the cut (set at four-over par) continuing his streak of not missing a cut at any of the four majors. (Official PGA Championship Website)

== 11 August 2005 (Thursday) ==
- Golf: US PGA Championship: Phil Mickelson, Ben Curtis, Stuart Appleby, Rory Sabbatini, Trevor Immelman and Stephen Ames are tied for the lead after the first round at Baltusrol Golf Club in Springfield, New Jersey with three-under par 67's. Official PGA Championship Web Site
- Major League Baseball:
  - The Oakland Athletics take the lead in the American League's Western Division by beating the Los Angeles Angels, 5–4. The winning run scores in the bottom of the ninth inning when pitcher Francisco Rodríguez drops a routine return toss from the catcher, allowing Jason Kendall to score from third. (AP)
  - New York Mets right fielder Mike Cameron is taken off the field on a stretcher after colliding with teammate Carlos Beltrán in the seventh inning of a 2–1 loss to the San Diego Padres. Cameron suffered a broken nose, multiple cheekbone fractures and a mild concussion. (AP)
- Football: UEFA Cup Second Qualifying Round first leg.
  - Southern/Mediterranean zone:
  - Inter Zaprešic 1 – 3 Red Star Belgrade
  - FK Baskimi 0 – 5 Maccabi Petach Tikva
  - Dinamo București 3 – 1 AC Omonia
  - OFK Beograd 2 – 1 Lokomotiv Plovdiv
  - APOEL 1 – 0 Maccabi Tel Aviv
  - Litex Lovech 1 – 0 HNK Rijeka
  - FC Vaduz 0 – 1 Beşiktaş
  - Rapid București 3 – 0 FK Vardar
  - NK Publikum 1 – 0 Levski Sofia
  - FK Zeta 0 – 1 Široki Brijeg
  - F.C. Ashdod 2 – 2 Domžale
  - Central/Eastern zone:
  - Krylya Sovetov Samara 2 – 0 BATE Borisov
  - MFC Sopron 0 – 3 Metalurh Donetsk
  - Grasshopper 1 – 0 Wisła Płock
  - Nistru Otaci 0 – 2 Grazer AK
  - MŠK Žilina 1 – 2 Austria Vienna
  - SV Pasching 2 – 2 Zenit St. Petersburg
  - MTZ-RIPO Minsk 1 – 1 FK Teplice
  - Dyskobolia Grodzisk Wielkopolski 4 – 1 Dukla Banská Bystrica
  - FC Banants 2 – 4 Dnipro Dnipropetrovsk
  - Legia Warszawa 0 – 1 FC Zürich
  - Northern zone:
  - Halmstads BK 1 – 1 Linfield
  - FC Midtjylland 2 – 1 B36
  - Brann 0 – 0 Allianssi
  - Liepājas Metalurgs 2 – 3 KRC Genk
  - Rhyl 0 – 1 Viking FK
  - Myllykosken Pallo-47 0 – 0 Dundee United
  - FC København 2 – 0 Carmarthen Town
  - Mainz 05 2 – 0 Keflavík
  - Djurgårdens IF 1 – 1 Cork City
  - EfB 0 – 1 Tromsø

== 10 August 2005 (Wednesday) ==
- Cricket: 2005 English cricket season: National League, Division One: Hampshire (251 for 5) beat Lancashire (243) by 8 runs. (BBC)
- Football: UEFA Champions League 2005–2006, Third Qualifying Round, first leg.
  - Malmö FF 0 – 1 FC Thun
  - Brøndby I.F. 2 – 2 Ajax
  - Artmedia Bratislava 0 – 0 FK Partizan
  - RSC Anderlecht 2 – 1 Slavia Praha
  - FC Basel 2 – 1 Werder Bremen
  - Rapid Wien 1 – 1 Lokomotiv Moskva
  - Shakhtar Donetsk 0 – 2 Internazionale
  - Steaua București 1 – 1 Rosenborg
  - Sporting Lisbon 0 – 1 Udinese
  - CSKA Sofia 1 – 3 Liverpool

== 9 August 2005 (Tuesday) ==
- Ice hockey: A report in The Philadelphia Inquirer states that Comcast and the National Hockey League have agreed to a two-year contract worth almost $100 million (US) for a two-year deal for cable television rights with games to be carried on Comcast's OLN channel. The deal is subject to the approval of the league's Board of Governors (owners) and ESPN, who previously held the rights.
- Major League Baseball:
  - The game between American League rivals the New York Yankees and the Chicago White Sox, is delayed four minutes in the eighth inning after 18-year-old Scott Harper falls from the upper deck behind home plate at Yankee Stadium, landing on netting between the barrier in front of the upper deck, and the backstop behind home plate. Harper eventually walks back on the netting and security helps him back up onto the deck, and then out of the stadium. A YES Network camera filming a defensive play shook as Harper landed on the netting. The White Sox win the game 2–1 to improve their AL-best record to 73–39. (ESPN.com) Photos of Harper after the fall are at
  - An arbitrator orders Texas Rangers pitcher Kenny Rogers reinstated. Rogers had served 12 games of a 20-game suspension for shoving two cameraman in June (AP)
- Cricket:
  - Indian Oil Cup: Sri Lanka (281 for 9) beat India (263 for 9) by 18 runs in the final of the competition. Sanath Jayasuriya's 67 makes him the fourth man to score 10,000 runs in One Day Internationals. (BBC)
  - 2005 English cricket season:
    - National League, Division One: Nottinghamshire (88 for 2) beat Gloucestershire (87) by 8 wickets. (BBC)
    - National League, Division Two: Surrey (259 for 4) beat Leicestershire (258 for 5) by 6 wickets. (BBC)
- Football: UEFA Champions League 2005–2006, Third Qualifying Round, first leg.
  - Manchester United 3 – 0 Debrecen
  - Everton 1 – 2 Villarreal
  - Wisła Kraków 3 – 1 Panathinaikos
  - Anorthosis Famagusta 1 – 2 Rangers
  - Vålerenga IF 1 – 0 Club Brugge
  - Real Betis 1 – 0 AS Monaco

== 8 August 2005 (Monday) ==
- Football: Italian club Genoa FC lost their appeal for match fixing after winning the 2004–05 Serie B championship and were demoted from Serie A to Serie C1/A, and penalized three points to begin the season. The team also faces discipline from their Italian Cup match being abandoned due to unruly fan behavior, who also caused rioting against local law enforcement.
- Ice hockey:
  - The NHL's all-time leading scorer, Wayne Gretzky, is named head coach of the Phoenix Coyotes. (ESPN)
  - Todd Bertuzzi was reinstated by the NHL and will play in the upcoming 2005–06 season. Bertuzzi, who was suspended by the NHL for the remainder of the 2003–04 NHL season after seriously injuring Steve Moore during a game against the Colorado Avalanche, was also banned from playing in Europe by the IIHF during the 2004–05 NHL lockout. (ESPN)
- Cricket:
  - 2005 English cricket season: National League, Division One: Lancashire (236 for 9) beat Northamptonshire (172) by 64 runs. (BBC)
  - New Zealand (452 for 9 dec.) beat Zimbabwe (59 & 99) by an innings and 294 runs in the first Test match of their tour of the country. The game is one of only twelve Test matches in history not to go to a third day. (BBC)
  - ICC Intercontinental Cup: The United States have been expelled from the Tournament because of the ongoing political difficulties in American cricket. They are to be replaced by the Cayman Islands. (ESPN)
- American football: Pro Football Hall of Fame Game in Canton, Ohio: The Chicago Bears rally to defeat the Miami Dolphins, 27–24. (ESPN)

== 7 August 2005 (Sunday) ==
- Auto Racing: NASCAR Nextel Cup: Tony Stewart realizes a boyhood dream by finally winning at Indianapolis Motor Speedway after several near-misses. The Rushville, Indiana native leads 44 laps en route to winning the Allstate 400 at The Brickyard, with Kasey Kahne finishing second and Brian Vickers finishing third. Stewart's win puts him on top of the Nextel Cup standings after Jimmie Johnson crashed hard late in the race, finishing 38th. (NASCAR.com)
- American football: Dan Marino, Steve Young, Fritz Pollard and Benny Friedman are officially inducted into the Pro Football Hall of Fame in Canton, Ohio.
- Cricket:
  - 2005 English cricket season:
    - The 2005 Ashes: England (407 & 182) beat Australia (308 & 279) by 2 runs in the Second Test match at Edgbaston, Birmingham, England to level the five-match series 1–1. (BBC)
    - County Championship, Division Two: Somerset County Cricket Club Somerset (460 & 245 for 5 dec.) beat Derbyshire (438 for 8 dec. & 262) by 5 runs. (BBC)
    - National League, Division One:
      - Essex (202 for 8) beat Middlesex (198 for 9) by 4 runs. (BBC)
      - Gloucestershire (188 for 5) beat Hampshire (186) by 5 wickets. (BBC)
    - National League, Division Two:
      - Surrey (212 for 5) beat Kent (211) by 5 wickets. (BBC)
      - Yorkshire (207 for 5) beat Scotland (203 for 9) by 5 wickets. (BBC)
      - Leicestershire (227 for 4) beat Sussex (223 for 8) by 6 wickets. (BBC)
  - Indian Oil Cup: India (262 for 4) beat West Indies (255 for 9) by 7 runs to join Sri Lanka in the final of the One Day International triangular series. (BBC)
- Football: In the traditional start to the English Premiership season, the FA Community Shield, Chelsea defeat crosstown rivals Arsenal 2–1, with Didier Drogba scoring both goals for the winners. (BBC)
- AFL: Round 19 Results
  - Brisbane Lions 18.13 (121) def. Hawthorn 11.14 (80) at The Gabba, Brisbane
  - Carlton 16.13 (109) def. by Port Adelaide 18.15 (123) at the MCG, Melbourne
  - Collingwood 14.14 (98) def. by Kangaroos 15.14 (104) at Telstra Dome, Melbourne
- NRL: Round 22 Results
  - Canberra 14 def. by Wests Tigers 22 at Canberra Stadium, Canberra
  - Sydney 28 def. by Penrith 30 at service@hornby-railway-trains.co.uk, Sydney
  - Manly 21 def. Brisbane 20 at Brookvale Oval, Sydney

== 6 August 2005 (Saturday) ==
- American football: In the NFL's first pre-season game, the Atlanta Falcons defeat the Indianapolis Colts, 27–20 in the American Bowl tilt at the Tokyo Dome in Tokyo, Japan. (ESPN)
- Cricket:
  - 2005 English cricket season:
    - County Championship, Division One:
      - Hampshire (385 & 388 for 7) beat Gloucestershire (363 & 232) by 178 runs. (BBC)
      - Warwickshire (272 & 383 for 7) beat Middlesex (323 & 330) by 3 wickets. (BBC)
    - County Championship, Division Two:
      - Northamptonshire (189 & 386) beat Worcestershire (216 & 222) by 137 runs. (BBC)
      - Essex (245 & 299 for 8) beat Durham (196 & 347) by 2 wickets. (BBC)
      - Lancashire (291 & 368 for 9) beat Leicestershire (261 & 164) by 234 runs. (BBC)
  - Indian Oil Cup: West Indies (226 for 7) beat Sri Lanka (193) by 33 runs in the ODI triangular series. (BBC)
- Rugby union: In the second match of the Tri Nations Series from Cape Town, the Springboks (South Africa) upset the All Blacks (New Zealand) 22–16. The win moves the Springboks ahead of the Australia Wallabies into second in the world rankings. (BBC)
- AFL: Round 19 Results
  - Western Bulldogs 21.14 (140) def. West Coast Eagles 14.13 (97) at the MCG, Melbourne
  - Adelaide 13.22 (100) def. Melbourne 7.4 (46) at AAMI Stadium, Adelaide
  - Essendon 15.8 (98) def. by Sydney 18.10 (118) at Telstra Dome, Melbourne
  - Fremantle 13.15 (93) def. Richmond 9.12 (66) at Subiaco Oval, Perth
- NRL: Round 22 Results
  - Cronulla 40 def. Melbourne 16 at Toyota Park, Sydney
  - Bulldogs 13 def. by Newcastle 28 at Telstra Stadium, Sydney
  - New Zealand 20 def. by Parramatta 38 at Ericsson Stadium, Auckland

== 5 August 2005 (Friday) ==
- College Sports: The National Collegiate Athletic Association announces a ban on American Indian mascots in NCAA playoff tournaments, as of 2008. (AP)
- NBA: League commissioner David Stern announces that the 2007 NBA All-Star Game will be held in Las Vegas, making it the first city without a franchise to host the event. (Yahoo!)
- Cricket: 2005 English cricket season: County Championship, Division One:
  - Kent (587) beat Glamorgan (306 & 157) by an innings and 124 runs. (BBC)
  - Sussex (378 & 125 for 5) beat Surrey (248 & 254) by 5 wickets. (BBC)
- AFL: Round 19 Results
  - St Kilda 13.18 (96) def. Geelong 8.7 (55) at Telstra Dome, Melbourne
- NRL: Round 22 Results
  - North Queensland 16 def. by St. George Illawarra 36 at Dairy Farmers Stadium, Townsville

== 4 August 2005 (Thursday) ==
- Baseball: The struggling Baltimore Orioles fire manager Lee Mazzilli. Under interim manager Sam Perlozzo, the O's defeat the Los Angeles Angels of Anaheim, 4–1, snapping an eight-game losing streak.
- National Hockey League: Jeremy Roenick is traded from the Philadelphia Flyers to the Los Angeles Kings for "future considerations." A day earlier, Peter Forsberg joined the Flyers from the Colorado Avalanche. Bringing in Forsberg put the Flyers over the maximum salary cap limit, and trading Roenick put them back under it. Roenick himself stated that the Flyers were better off with Forsberg, and without him. (Yahoo!)

== 3 August 2005 (Wednesday) ==
- Cricket:
  - 2005 English cricket season: National League: Derbyshire (277 for 5) beat Somerset (262 for 9) by 15 runs Derbyshire. (BBC)
  - Indian Oil Cup: Sri Lanka (221 for 6) beat India (220 for 8) by 4 wickets. During the match Indian batsman Sourav Ganguly becomes the third player to pass 10,000 runs in One Day Internationals. (BBC)
- Horse Racing: Jockey Pat Day announces his retirement. (BBC)
- NBA: A massive trade is made amongst five teams which sees the following players change teams:
  - The Miami Heat acquire: Antoine Walker (from Boston), Jason Williams, James Posey, and Andre Emmett (all three from Memphis), plus the rights to Roberto Dueñas (from New Orleans)
  - The Memphis Grizzlies acquire: Eddie Jones (from Miami) and Raúl López (from Utah)
  - The Utah Jazz re-acquire Greg Ostertag (from Memphis)
  - The Boston Celtics acquire: Curtis Borchardt (from Utah) and Qyntel Woods, the rights to Albert Mireles, a pair of second round picks, and cash (all from Miami)
  - The New Orleans Hornets acquire: Rasual Butler (from Miami) and Kirk Snyder (from Utah)

The 13 players involved (not counting draft picks) set an NBA record for most players involved in a single trade. (ESPN)

- Football: UEFA Champions League 2005–2006, Second Qualifying round, second leg. Teams progressing to the third qualifying round shown in **bold**.
  - FC Haka 1 – 4 **Vålerenga** (UEFA.com)
  - Maccabi Haifa 2 – 2 **Malmö** (UEFA.com)
  - Neftchi 1 – 0 **Anderlecht** (UEFA.com)
  - Trabzonspor 1 – 0 **Anorthosis Famagusta** (UEFA.com)
  - **Lokomotiv Moscow** 2 – 0 Rabotnicki (UEFA.com)
  - **Rapid Vienna** 3 – 2 F91 Dudelange (UEFA.com)
  - **FC Thun** 1 – 0 Dynamo Kyiv (UEFA.com)
  - **Brøndby** 3 – 1 Dinamo Tbilisi (UEFA.com)
  - Hajduk Split 0 – 5 **Debrecen** (UEFA.com)
  - **Steaua Bucharest** 4 – 1 Shelbourne (UEFA.com)
  - Sheriff Tiraspol 0 – 1 **Partizan Belgrade** (UEFA.com)
  - **CSKA Sofia** 2 – 0 Tirana (UEFA.com)

== 2 August 2005 (Tuesday) ==
- Cricket:
  - 2005 English cricket season: National League: Northamptonshire (275 for 4) beat Worcestershire (237 for 9) by 38 runs. (BBC)
  - Indian Oil Cup: Sri Lanka (241 for 6) beat West Indies (191) by 50 runs in the third match of the ODI Triangular Series. (BBC)
- Baseball:
  - Seattle Mariners pitcher Ryan Franklin becomes the second player in consecutive days to receive a ten-day suspension for steroid use.
  - Minnesota Twins outfielder Torii Hunter is declared out for the rest of the 2005 season after suffering an injury at Fenway Park on 31 July tearing tendons and breaking his ankle.
- Basketball:
  - Miami Heat center Shaquille O'Neal signs a five-year, $100 million (US) contract extension.
  - WNBA: Sheryl Swoopes makes a jump shot with ten seconds to go and Deanna Nolan misses two field goal attempts in the game's last two seconds, as the Houston Comets hold on to a 62–61 victory over the Detroit Shock. WNBA.com
- Football: UEFA Champions League 2005–2006, Second Qualifying round, second leg. Teams progressing to the third qualifying round shown in **bold**.
  - **Liverpool** 2 – 0 FBK Kaunas
  - Celtic 4 – 0 **Artmedia Bratislava**
- Formula One: Scuderia Ferrari announce that Brazilian Felipe Massa will replace Rubens Barrichello for the 2006 Formula One season. (Formula1.com)

== 1 August 2005 (Monday) ==
- Cricket: 2005 English cricket season:
  - Australians in England: Australia (406 for 9 and 161 for 2) drew with Worcestershire (187) in a rain-affected tour match. (BBC)
  - National League, Division Two: Sussex (266 for 3) beat Somerset (255 for 9) by 11 runs. (BBC)
- Baseball:
  - Rafael Palmeiro of the Baltimore Orioles is suspended for 10 days for violating Major League Baseball's steroids policy. He had categorically denied ever having used steroids during a U.S. House hearing on 17 March 2005. (AP/Yahoo!)
  - Barry Bonds of the San Francisco Giants says he will miss the rest of the 2005 season due to the injuries he suffered in spring training in an interview posted on MLB.com.
