= June 2005 in sports =

<<	June 2005					>>
Su	Mo	Tu	We	Th	Fr	Sa
			1	2	3	4
5	6	7	8	9	10	11
12	13	14	15	16	17	18
19	20	21	22	23	24	25
26	27	28	29	30
India; Sports

This list shows notable sports-related deaths, events, and notable outcomes that occurred in June of 2005.

== Deaths ==
- 28 – Dick Dietz
- 18 – Syed Mushtaq Ali
- 7 – Terry Long
- 2 – Lucio Escoña
- 1 – George Mikan

== Ongoing events ==
- 2005 English cricket season
- 2005 ICC Intercontinental Cup
- 2005 in NASCAR
- 4 June–9 July: Rugby union: Lions tour of New Zealand
- 5 June-12 September: Cricket: The Ashes tour
- 10 June–2 July: Football: World Youth Championship
- 20 June–3 July: Tennis: Wimbledon

== 30 June 2005 (Thursday) ==
- Tennis: Rain disrupted the Women's Semi-Final at the Wimbledon Championships. Play didn't start until after 5pm when it should have begun at 1 pm. Despite the delay fans were treated with two superb matches. In a shockingly powerful performance Venus Williams (seeded 14th) beat the reigning champion Maria Sharapova in straight sets, 7–6 (7–2) 6–1. The win was highly unexpected but the match was considered some of the best Tennis from the ladies all season. In Court 1 Lindsay Davenport faced Amélie Mauresmo in an equally highly entertaining match. In the middle of the 3rd set it began to rain and so the match was left at 7–6 6–7 5–3 to Davenport. (BBC Sport)

== 29 June 2005 (Wednesday) ==
- Baseball: Texas Rangers pitcher Kenny Rogers is in trouble with his team and could be in trouble with the law after he shoves two cameramen walking onto the field at Ameriquest Field in Arlington, Texas for a pre-game warm-up before a game against the Los Angeles Angels. One of the cameramen, Larry Rodriguez, filed assault charges against Rogers. Rodriguez was taken to a local hospital, complaining of neck, back, and arm pain. Rogers has refused to talk to local media (Dallas, in this case) this season after a report was released during spring training that said Rogers was having trouble trying to get a contract extension with the Rangers. (Yahoo!)
- Tennis: In today's Wimbledon men's quarterfinals, defending champion Roger Federer beat Chilean Fernando González in straight sets 7–5 6–2 7–6(2). Andy Roddick also made it through to the final four after beating Sébastien Grosjean in a tough but exhilarating five-set thriller 3–6 6–2 6–1 3–6 6–3. Meanwhile, Australian Lleyton Hewitt saw off Feliciano López in straight sets 7–5 6–4 7–6(2) and finally Thomas Johansson reached his first ever Wimbledon semi-final by seeing off David Nalbandian in straight sets 7–6(5) 6–2 6–2. (BBC Sport)
- Auto racing:
  - Formula One:
    - The seven teams that use Michelin tires are found guilty on two of five charges brought against them before the World Motor Sport Council for their failure to race in the 2005 United States Grand Prix. Announcement of punishment has been deferred to September 14. (Motorsport.com)
    - The 2006 Formula One season may have a record 20 races, as the FIA releases the preliminary calendar for next year. How the race order will go is yet to be determined, but the Malaysian Grand Prix is presumed to be the season opener, because the usual season opener, the Australian Grand Prix, is being pushed back to April because of the 2006 Commonwealth Games. (FIA press release; calendar is located on the very bottom)

== 28 June 2005 (Tuesday) ==
- Basketball:
  - The 2005 NBA draft takes place in New York City. The Milwaukee Bucks make Andrew Bogut, a center from Australia by way of the University of Utah, the top overall pick. Four players from reigning NCAA champions North Carolina are among the lottery picks (i.e., the first 14 players drafted). (AP/Yahoo!)
- Auto racing:
  - Formula One:
    - Michelin announces they will reimburse all money to all spectators who attended the 2005 United States Grand Prix in Indianapolis, in which the seven teams that use Michelins refused to take part in over safety issues regarding their tires. Michelin also announces they will offer to buy 20,000 tickets for next year's United States Grand Prix to give to spectators who attended this year's race, trying to help better promote the sport in the United States. How those tickets will be distributed and how much money will be given back is unclear at this time. (CNN.com)
    - The seven teams who refused to race in the recent 2005 United States Grand Prix will face a disciplinary hearing this coming Wednesday. The teams face charges of bringing the sport into disrepute and could be docked constructors' points. (BBC Sport)
- Tennis: Venus Williams, Maria Sharapova, Lindsay Davenport and Amélie Mauresmo are all in the Wimbledon semi-finals after they saw off stiff competition respectively in today's Quarter Finals. (BBC Sport)
- Cricket: Rain stopped play six overs into England's run-chase in the NatWest Series match against Australia. Play was stopped a couple of times before that as well, but eventually – with England 37–1 – the match was declared a no-result. England's bowling restricted the Australian score to 261–9. Darren Gough claimed three late wickets among five falling for 30 runs. Andrew Symonds had the top-score with 74, putting on 101 with Mike Hussey (45). (BBC Sport)
- Rugby union: The British & Irish Lions score the first truly convincing win of their current tour of New Zealand, destroying NPC Division Two team Manawatu 109–6. Wales international Shane Williams equals a Lions record with five tries. (BBC)

== 26 June 2005 (Sunday) ==
- Golf:
  - South Korea's Birdie Kim wins the U.S. Women's Open with an overall score of 3-over, making birdie on the 72nd and final hole to break a tie between her and amateur Morgan Pressel. Annika Sörenstam finishes at 12-over in an 8-way tie for 23rd, ending her hopes of winning the calendar grand slam. Michelle Wie, who had been in a three-way tie for the lead after the third round, balloons to a final-round 82 and finishes level with Sörenstam. (LPGA.com)
  - PGA Tour: Ireland's Pádraig Harrington gets his second PGA Tour win this season, and the second of his career at the Barclays Classic in Rye, New York with a score of 10-under. (PGATOUR.com)
- Auto racing:
  - NASCAR: Tony Stewart wins the Nextel Cup Series Dodge/SaveMart 350 at the Infineon Raceway in Sonoma, California, passing Ricky Rudd in the closing laps. (NASCAR.com)
  - Champ Car World Series: Paul Tracy defeats A. J. Allmendinger to win the Grand Prix of Cleveland at the Burke Lakefront Airport in Cleveland, Ohio. (ChampCarWorldSeries.com)

== 25 June 2005 (Saturday) ==
- Arturo Gatti vs. Floyd Mayweather Jr.
  - Gatti's corner stopped the fight following the sixth round. Mayweather was leading on all cards.
- Rugby union: In the first Test match of the British & Irish Lions tour of New Zealand, the Lions are comprehensively beaten 21–3 in Christchurch by the All Blacks. Lions captain Brian O'Driscoll suffers a dislocated shoulder less than two minutes in, ending his tour, and fellow Lion Richard Hill is also injured. (BBC)

== 23 June 2005 (Friday) ==
(Or 24 June 2005 for those in the Eastern Standard Time zone)

- Basketball: The San Antonio Spurs win their third NBA championship in seven years, defeating the Detroit Pistons 81–74 in the first game 7 in an NBA Finals since 1994. Tim Duncan is named the most valuable player of the series for the third time. Only Magic Johnson, Michael Jordan, and Shaquille O'Neal have won three MVPs besides Duncan. Jordan won a record six. (NBA.com)

== 21 June 2005 (Tuesday) ==
- Basketball: The NBA and the NBA Players Association agree to a new collective bargaining agreement, averting a potential lockout. Among the terms of the agreement is an age limit, which will require all American players to be 19 or older on draft day. (ESPN.com)
- Cricket: England (391–4, Paul Collingwood 112 not out and 6–31, Andrew Strauss 152) beat Bangladesh (223 all out) by 168 runs, as England set the second highest One-day International score ever, and Collingwood became the first to score a century and take a six-wicket-haul in the same match. BBC

== 19 June 2005 (Sunday) ==
- Football (soccer): In the final of the 2005 UEFA Women's Championship, Germany beat Norway 3–1, to win the title for the fourth successive time. (UEFA.com)
- Cricket: England (253 for 7, Kevin Pietersen 91 not out) beat Australia (252–9) by 3 wickets to hand Australia their second defeat in two days, and their fourth consecutive loss to England in all competitions. (BBC)
- Auto racing:
  - Dane Tom Kristensen wins his record seventh race at the 24 Hours of Le Mans for Audi with JJ Lehto and Merco Werner. (ESPN)
  - Formula One: At the start of the United States Grand Prix race in the 2005 season all cars using Michelin tires pull out of the race because of safety concerns. Michael Schumacher wins, Rubens Barrichello finishes second, and Tiago Monteiro finishes third. A happy Monteiro is the only one who sprays champagne on the podium. Some angry fans vent frustration by hurtling bottles and other forms of trash onto the circuit. (BBC)
  - NASCAR Nextel Cup: Greg Biffle takes his fifth win of the year at the Batman Begins 400 at Michigan International Speedway. Biffle has won the last two races at the track. (ESPN)
- Golf: Michael Campbell of New Zealand wins the 2005 U.S. Open with a score of even par, two strokes ahead of Tiger Woods. (ESPN)

== 18 June 2005 (Saturday) ==
- Cricket: Bangladesh (250 for 5, Mohammad Ashraful 100) beat Australia (249 for 5, Damien Martyn 77) by 5 wickets in one of the biggest upsets in cricket's history.Rediff.com

== 16 June 2005 (Thursday) ==
- Football (soccer): In the second semi-final of the 2005 UEFA Women's Championship, Norway beat Sweden 3–2 after extra time. (UEFA.com) Norway will meet Euro and World Cup title-holders Germany in Sunday's final, to be played at Ewood Park, Blackburn.
- Cricket: England (192 for 0, Trescothick 100*, Strauss 82*) beat Bangladesh (190, Aftab 51) by ten wickets in the first match of the NatWest Series at the Oval. (Wisden Cricinfo)

== 14 June 2005 (Tuesday) ==
- Athletics – Men's 100 metres – Asafa Powell of Jamaica sets a new world record of 9.77 at the Athens Olympic Stadium. (BBC)
  - Powel shaved one hundredth of a second off Tim Montgomery's record of 9.78 set in Paris in 2002.

== 13 June 2005 (Monday) ==
- NASCAR: The merger between the Sprint Corporation and Nextel means that the Nextel Cup Series will become the Sprint Cup Series in 2007. The name change is expected to be approved within two weeks. (The Tennessean)

== 12 June 2005 (Sunday) ==
- Arena football: The Colorado Crush win ArenaBowl XIX in Las Vegas 51–48 over the Georgia Force. Crush kicker Clay Rush kicks the title-winning field goal with 3 seconds left. (ArenaFootball.com)
- Auto racing:
  - Formula One: Kimi Räikkönen wins the Canadian Grand Prix in Montreal over Michael Schumacher. Both Renaults drop out, and Juan Pablo Montoya is disqualified for failing to heed the red light at the end of pit road as the safety car leads by a long string of cars, a safety car that was brought out after polesitter Jenson Button crashes. (Formula1.com)
  - Nextel Cup: Carl Edwards wins the Pocono 500 in Long Pond, Pennsylvania for his second Nextel Cup win of the season. (NASCAR.com)
- Football (soccer): Norway join Germany in the semi-finals of the 2005 UEFA Women's Championship following a 5–3 defeat of Italy and Germany's 3–0 win over France. (UEFA.com –Norway-Italy, Germany-France)
- Golf:
  - Annika Sörenstam becomes the first woman to win the first two majors of the year since 1986, waltzing to a three-shot win at the LPGA Championship in Havre de Grace, Maryland. Second place went to 15-year-old Michelle Wie, who scored the highest finish by an amateur in a major since 1998. (AP/Yahoo!)
  - Sergio García wins the Booz Allen Classic on the PGA Tour, this year held at Congressional Country Club in Bethesda, Maryland. The Classic, the old Kemper Open, is held annually in suburban Washington, D.C.. It is generally held at the TPC (Tournament Players Club) at Avenel in Potomac, Maryland, but Avenel is being renovated. Having the tournament at Congressional, the week before this year's U.S. Open, attracted the best field ever for the event. (AP/Yahoo!)

== 11 June 2005 (Saturday) ==
- Horse racing: Afleet Alex passes Giacomo in the final turn at Belmont Park in Elmont, New York, and runs away with the Belmont Stakes, the final jewel of the now meaningless Triple Crown.
- NFL Europe: The Amsterdam Admirals defeat the Berlin Thunder 27–21 to win World Bowl XIII, held at the LTU Arena in Düsseldorf.
- Boxing:
  - Former heavyweight champion Mike Tyson quits his fight with little-regarded Kevin McBride after six rounds, giving the large Irishman an unexpected victory. ESPN
  - WBO super lightweight champion Miguel Cotto preserves his undefeated record by defeating Muhammad Abdullaev on a technical knockout in the ninth round. Cotto had earlier been beaten by Abdullaev for the gold medal at the 2000 Summer Olympics. ESPN
- Auto racing: Tomas Scheckter wins the IndyCar Bombardier Learjet 500k at Texas Motor Speedway in Fort Worth, Texas.

== 10 June 2005 (Friday) ==
- Football: UEFA grants special dispensation to allow 2005 UEFA Champions League winners Liverpool to enter the 2005–2006 Champions League in the first qualifying round. The position of the other four English entries in the draw for the competition will not be affected. (ESPN Soccernet)

== 9 June 2005 (Thursday) ==
- Football:
  - 2005 UEFA Women's Championship:
    - Italy 0–4 Germany (UEFA.com)
    - France 1–1 Norway (UEFA.com)

== 8 June 2005 (Wednesday) ==
- Football:
  - 2006 FIFA World Cup:
    - Iran, Japan, Saudi Arabia and South Korea become the first four nations after the hosts to qualify for next year's World Cup Finals in Germany. Saudi Arabia and South Korea secure the top two positions in Asian Qualifying Group A, and Iran and Japan secure the top two positions in Group B, all with one match to spare. (BBC)
    - Later, Argentina becomes the next team to qualify after defeating archrivals Brazil 3–1 in South America qualifying in Buenos Aires. With the win, Argentina assures itself of finishing no worse than fourth in its group, which guarantees automatic qualification. (Reuters/Yahoo!)
  - 2005 UEFA Women's Championship:
    - Denmark 2–1 host England (UEFA.com)
    - Sweden 0–0 Finland (UEFA.com)

== 7 June 2005 (Tuesday) ==
- Golf:
  - LPGA: LPGA commissioner Ty Votaw announces that the women's tour will implement a playoff system in 2006 at the season-ending ADT Championship. The playoff system will consist of 30 players determined by a points system, and two wild cards. The winner of the tournament will win a $1 million prize. (USAToday.com)

== 6 June 2005 (Monday) ==
- Football (soccer):
  - Women's Euro 2005
    - Germany beat Norway 1–0 in the opening match in Group B, while Marinette Pichon scored two goals as France beat Italy by 3–1.
- Basketball:
  - NBA Playoffs: The defending champion Detroit Pistons earn their second consecutive trip to the NBA Finals with an 88–82 victory over the Miami Heat in Game 7 of the Eastern Conference Finals. They will meet the San Antonio Spurs. Game 1 of the Finals will be on June 9. (AP/Yahoo!)

== 5 June 2005 (Sunday) ==
- Rugby union:
  - In their North American tour, Wales defeats the USA in East Hartford, Connecticut by a record 77 points to 3, despite two-thirds of their regular team being unavailable through being on the British & Irish Lions team currently touring New Zealand. (BBC)
- Floorball:
  - Switzerland's women team wins the Women's World Floorball Championship 2005 in Singapore, defeating the team of Finland 4–3 (2–1, 1–1, 1–1). Former world champion Sweden takes the third place.
- Golf:
  - Bart Bryant wins the PGA Tour's Memorial Tournament with a final score of 16-under par. It's Bryant's second career PGA Tour win. (PGATOUR.com)
- Tennis:
  - Rafael Nadal beats Mariano Puerta for the men's singles title in the 2005 French Open.
- Cricket:
  - 2005 ICC Intercontinental Cup:
    - Kenya (300-6d & 282-9d) (17pts) drew with Namibia (335-9d & 68–5) (15pts) at Windhoek. Kenya go through to the semi-finals as winners of the African group
- 2005 English cricket season:
  - Bangladesh Tour, 2nd Test:
    - England (447 for 3 declared, Ian Bell 162*, Marcus Trescothick 151, Graham Thorpe 66*) beat Bangladesh (104, Steve Harmison 5/38, and 316, Aftab Ahmed 82*, Javed Omar 71, Habibul Bashar 63, Matthew Hoggard 5 for 73) by an innings and 27 runs to win the second Test at Riverside, Chester-le-Street. England win the two-Test series 2–0 to cement their ranking as the second-best Test team in the world. Bangladesh remain tenth.
  - Australian Tour of England:
    - The Australian team has landed in England to start their tour of England
  - National League, Division One:
    - The match between Glamorgan (2pts) and Nottinghamshire (2pts) is abandoned without a ball being bowled
  - National League, Division Two:
- Boxing:
  - Ricky Hatton defeats Kostya Tszyu to become the new IBF Light Welterweight champion of the world at the MEN Arena in Manchester, England. Tszyu was behind on the cards of all three judges when he failed to answer the bell for the 12th, and final, round. (BBC)
- Football (soccer):
  - Women's Euro 2005
    - Sweden and Denmark battle to a 1–1 draw in the opening match at Bloomfield Road in Blackpool. (BBC)
    - In the day's second match, a competition-record crowd of 29,092 at the City of Manchester Stadium watches England defeat Finland 3–2 in a match in the same group. The Finns came back from 0–2 at half-time to tie the match 2–2 when Laura Kalmari scored with two minutes to go, but England's 17-year-old striker Karen Carney scored the decisive goal in injury time. (BBC)

== 4 June 2005 (Saturday) ==
- Arena Football League:
  - The Georgia Force win the Arena League's National Conference championship game 60–58 over the Orlando Predators. Force quarterback Matt Nagy throws 7 touchdown passes and runs for another. It's the franchise's first trip to the ArenaBowl as the Force, but third overall, as they made two straight trips in 2000 and 2001 as the old version of the Nashville Kats. They lost both times. (USAToday.com)
- 2005 English cricket season:
  - Bangladesh Tour, 2nd Test:
    - Ian Bell becomes the first Englishman since Les Ames 70 years ago to score 100 runs in a Test match before lunch
  - County Championship, Division One:
    - Sussex (12pts) drew with Glamorgan (8pts)
    - Hampshire (17pts) beat Nottinghamshire (4pts) by 14 runs
    - Surrey (10pts) drew with Warwickshire (8pts)
  - County Championship, Division Two:
    - Derbyshire (11pts) drew with Essex (9pts)
    - Lancashire (7pts) drew with Northamptonshire (7pts)
    - Leicestershire (10pts) drew with Somerset (7pts)
    - Worcestershire (9pts) drew with Durham (9pts)
- Football (soccer):
  - 2006 World Cup European qualifying
    - Israel come from behind to draw 2–2 with Ireland at Lansdowne Road in a bad-tempered match. Five Israeli players were given yellow cards, as was one Irish player while another Irish player, Andy O'Brien was sent off. (IOL)
- Tennis:
  - Justine Henin-Hardenne wins her second French Open title in three years, defeating 2000 champion and French citizen Mary Pierce 6–1, 6–1. (AP/ESPN)
- Rugby union:
  - The British & Irish Lions win the first match of their tour to New Zealand, defeating Bay of Plenty 34–20 in Rotorua. Experienced England back-rower Lawrence Dallaglio suffers a serious ankle injury, ending his tour. (BBC)
- Major League Baseball:
  - In a pivotal, yet still early-in-the-season game between National League East Division rivals the Florida Marlins and the Washington Nationals, Nationals outfielder Marlon Byrd accidentally railroads second base umpire Joe Brinkman while rushing toward first base ump Bill Miller to argue a call during the top of the seventh inning, a call that came a half-inning earlier. Byrd is ejected seconds before he smashes into Brinkman, who is uninjured. The incident overshadows the Nationals' 7–3 win. (SI.com)

== 3 June 2005 (Friday) ==
- 2005 English cricket season:
  - County Championship, Division One:
    - Kent (18pts) beat Gloucestershire (3pts) by 7 wickets. Kent are deducted 8pts for preparing a poor pitch
  - MCC University matches:
    - Cambridge UCCE beat Middlesex by 2 wickets
    - Yorkshire beat Bradford/Leeds UCCE by 5 wickets

== 2 June 2005 (Thursday) ==
- Auto racing: For the second time in a year-and-a-half, NASCAR Busch Series driver Shane Hmiel is suspended for violating NASCAR's substance abuse policy. In September 2003, Hmiel failed a drug test, and was barred indefinitely, with the punishing ultimately lasting five months. Hmeil has since hired a lawyer to combat this. (TheState.com)

== 1 June 2005 (Wednesday) ==
- Football:
  - An independent commission charged by the English Premier League with investigating the alleged "tapping up" of Arsenal defender Ashley Cole by Chelsea issues its findings. Cole, Chelsea, and Chelsea manager José Mourinho are all found guilty. Cole is fined £100,000, Mourinho £200,000, and Chelsea £300,000. Chelsea also receive a suspended three-point deduction for 2005–06, which will be assessed if they commit another tapping-up offense in the 2005–06 season. (BBC)
- Basketball:
  - NBA Playoffs: The San Antonio Spurs defeat the Phoenix Suns 101–95 to clinch the Western Conference finals, four games to one. The Spurs will play in the NBA Finals beginning June 9. (AP/Yahoo!)

== See also ==
- 2005 in sports
