= July 2005 in sports =

<<	July 2005					>>
Su	Mo	Tu	We	Th	Fr	Sa
					1	2
3	4	5	6	7	8	9
10	11	12	13	14	15	16
17	18	19	20	21	22	23
24	25	26	27	28	29	30
31
India; Sports

This list shows notable sports-related deaths, events, and notable outcomes that occurred in July of 2005.

== 31 July 2005 (Sunday) ==
- Cricket:
  - 2005 English cricket season: National League Division Two: Kent (218 for 5, Walker 58 not out) beat Yorkshire (216 for 6, Vaughan 116 not out) by 5 wickets. (BBC)
  - Indian Oil Cup: India (180 for 4, Dravid 52 not out) beat West Indies (178, Deonarine 41) by 6 wickets in the second match of the ODI Triangular Series. (BBC)
- Golf:
  - Jeong Jang wins the Weetabix Women's British Open at Royal Birkdale, her first LPGA win. (AP/ESPN)
  - Allen Doyle, nine shots behind after the third round of the U.S. Senior Open, shoots a course-record 63 (tied for the lowest round ever in the event) and wins his third senior major by one stroke. His final-round comeback is the most in the history of the senior majors; among the mainstream men's majors, only Paul Lawrie's comeback from 10 shots down on the final day of the 1999 Open Championship surpasses this feat. (USSeniorOpen.com)
- Auto racing
  - Formula One: Kimi Räikkönen wins the 2005 Hungarian Grand Prix at the Hungaroring in Budapest. Michael Schumacher finishes second, with younger brother Ralf finishing third, his first podium since the 2004 Japanese Grand Prix in Suzuka. Championship leader Fernando Alonso finishes 11th, the third time he's failed to score points this year, but the first time he's done so in finishing a race. Christian Klien does one rollover in an accident in the first turn after the start, but is not injured, and in fact, walks away. (Formula1.com)
  - IndyCar: Bryan Herta wins the Firestone Indy 400 at the Michigan International Speedway, his home track, and his first win since 2003.
  - ChampCar: Sébastien Bourdais wins the inaugural Grand Prix of San Jose.
- Baseball: The Baseball Hall of Fame inducts their two newest members — Ryne Sandberg and Wade Boggs — in Cooperstown, New York. The Hall also honors Jerry Coleman, recipient of the Ford C. Frick Award for excellence in baseball broadcasting, and Peter Gammons, recipient of the J. G. Taylor Spink Award for baseball writing.
- Fishing: Kevin VanDam won his second BassMasters Classic championship in Pittsburgh, Pennsylvania.

== 30 July 2005 (Saturday) ==
- Cricket:
  - Indian Oil Cup:
    - Sri Lanka 209 for 7 (Jayasuriya 43*) beat India 205 for 9 (Dravid 54 – Muralitharan 3/33) by three wickets
  - 2005 English cricket season: Twenty20 Cup:
    - Lancashire 217 for 4 (Symonds 52*, Flintoff 49) beat Surrey (Ramprakash 45, Benning 42) by 22 runs in the first semi-final. (BBC)
    - Somerset 157 for 9 beat Leicestershire 153 for 8 (Maddy 56) by four runs in the second semi-final. (BBC)
    - Somerset 118 for 3 (Smith 64*) beat Lancashire 114 for 8 (Law 59) by 7 wickets in the final, to win the Twenty20 Cup. (BBC)
- Rugby union: In the opener of the Tri Nations Series, the Springboks (South Africa) win a closely fought match with the Wallabies (Australia) 22–16. Percy Montgomery becomes the first Springbok to score 500 points in Test matches. (BBC)
- NHL: No surprise — the Pittsburgh Penguins select superstar prospect Sidney Crosby as the first overall pick in the NHL entry draft.
- Football (soccer): In the 2005 Major League Soccer All-Star Game, the MLS All-Stars defeat Fulham of the English Premiership 4–1 at Columbus Crew Stadium in Columbus, Ohio. New England Revolution striker Taylor Twellman scores a goal and is named the game's MVP, while Jeff Cunningham of the Colorado Rapids scores twice after coming on in the 68th minute. (ESPN Soccernet) (MLSnet.com)

== 29 July 2005 (Friday) ==
- NFL
  - Philadelphia Eagles defensive end Jerome McDougle was shot in Miami, Florida in a robbery attempt. He will miss four to six weeks of training camp.
- Golf
  - Ernie Els will miss the rest of the 2005 season with a knee injury he suffered while sailing.

== 28 July 2005 (Thursday) ==
- Horse Racing
  - Afleet Alex, winner of the Preakness Stakes and the Belmont Stakes will miss the Haskell Invitational and Travers Stakes after suffering a left front leg injury.
- American football
  - University of Wisconsin–Madison head coach Barry Alvarez will step down after the 2004 college football season to stay on as the school's athletic director. Defensive coordinator Bret Bielema will assume the reins in 2006.
  - Ted Johnson, New England Patriots inside linebacker, announced his retirement.
- Baseball
  - In the longest game by innings in Toronto Blue Jays history, and the longest this year in Major League Baseball, the Blue Jays defeat the Los Angeles Angels of Anaheim, 2–1, in 18 innings at Rogers Centre.
- Basketball
  - The New York Knicks officially name Larry Brown as head coach, signing a five-year, $50 million contract, the richest ever for a coach/manager in sports history.
- Football: UEFA Cup 2005–06 First Qualifying Round, second leg. Teams progressing to the next round shown in **bold**.
  - Zepce 1 – 1 **Baskimi** (UEFA.com)
  - **APOEL** 4 – 0 Birkirkara (UEFA.com)
  - **Rapid București** 5 – 0 Sant Julià (UEFA.com)
  - **Široki Brijeg** 3 – 0 Teuta (UEFA.com)
  - **Vardar** 0 – 0 Elbasani (Vardar win on away goals) (UEFA.com)
  - Hibernians 0 – 3 **Omonia** (UEFA.com)
  - **Domžale** 3 – 0 Domagnano (UEFA.com)
  - **MTZ-RIPO Minsk** 1 – 2 Ferencváros (UEFA.com)
  - Lokomotivi Tbilisi 0 – 2 **Banants** (UEFA.com)
  - **BATE Borisov** 5 – 0 Torpedo Kutaisi (UEFA.com)
  - Dacia Chişinău 1 – 0 **FC Vaduz** (UEFA.com)
  - **MŠK Žilina** 3 – 1 Baku (UEFA.com)
  - MIKA 0 – 0 **Mainz 05** (UEFA.com)
  - Khazar Lenkoran 1 – 2 **Nistru Otaci** (UEFA.com)
  - **Carmarthen Town** 5 – 1 Longford Town (UEFA.com)
  - **Cork City** 0 – 1 Ekranas (UEFA.com)
  - **B36** 2 – 1 ÍBV (UEFA.com)
  - Pétange 1 – 1 **Allianssi** (UEFA.com)
  - Ventspils 2 – 1 **Linfield** (Linfield win on away goals) (UEFA.com)
  - **Liepājas Metalurgs** 3 – 0 NSÍ (UEFA.com)
  - **Keflavik** 2 – 0 Etzella Ettelbruck (UEFA.com)
  - **Viking** 1 – 0 Portadown (UEFA.com)
  - **MyPa** 1 – 0 TVMK Tallinn (UEFA.com)
  - Atlantas 3 – 2 **Rhyl** (Rhyl win on away goals) (UEFA.com)
  - Flora Tallinn 0 – 6 **Esbjerg** (UEFA.com)
- Ice hockey: Less than three weeks after the 2004–05 NHL lockout was resolved, Bob Goodenow steps down as the executive director of the National Hockey League Players' Association. Ted Saskin was named his replacement. (CBC)

== 27 July 2005 (Wednesday) ==
- Football: UEFA Champions League 2005–06: Second Qualifying Round, first leg:
  - F91 Dudelange 1 – 6 Rapid Vienna (UEFA.com)
  - Partizan 1 – 0 Sheriff (UEFA.com)
  - Shelbourne 0 – 0 Steaua Bucharest (UEFA.com)
  - Malmö FF 3 – 2 Maccabi Haifa (UEFA.com)
  - Artmedia Bratislava 5 – 0 Celtic (UEFA.com)
  - Rabotnički 1 – 1 Lokomotiv Moskva (UEFA.com)
  - SK Tirana 0 – 2 CSKA Sofia (UEFA.com)
  - Debrecen 3 – 0 Hajduk Split (UEFA.com)

== 26 July 2005 (Tuesday) ==
- Football: UEFA Champions League 2005–06: Second Qualifying Round, first leg:
  - Dinamo Tbilisi 0 – 2 Brøndby (UEFA.com)
  - Dynamo Kyiv 2 – 2 FC Thun (UEFA.com)
  - Anorthosis Famagusta 3 – 1 Trabzonspor (UEFA.com)
  - Anderlecht 5 – 0 Neftchi (UEFA.com)
  - Vålerenga IF 1 – 0 FC Haka (UEFA.com)
  - FBK Kaunas 1 – 3 Liverpool (UEFA.com)
- Baseball: Matt Clement of the Boston Red Sox is hit by a ball and has to leave the pitcher's mound during the third inning of their game against local team Tampa Bay Devil Rays, and requires overnight hospitalization as a precautionary measure. Johnny Damon of the Red Sox hits a home run in the tenth inning to give the Red Sox a 10–9 victory. BostonRedSox.com
- Basketball: The Phoenix Mercury's Kamila Vodichkova's establishes a new WNBA record by making ten field goal attempts in a row, and the Los Angeles Sparks Lisa Leslie sprained her left knee as the Mercury beat the Sparks, 77–60, in Phoenix. WNBA.com
  - BSN: The Arecibo Captains beat the Bayamón Cowboys, 88–84, in game four of the BSN's finals, to win Puerto Rico's national title for the first time since 1959. bsnpr.com, in Spanish

== 25 July 2005 (Monday) ==
- Baseball:
  - The Tampa Bay Devil Rays beat the Boston Red Sox, 4–3, in 10 innings. The game is significant in that it was the Red Sox' first extra-inning game this year, after 98 nine-inning games. Never before in the history of Major League Baseball had a team played so many games without going into extra innings.

== 24 July 2005 (Sunday) ==
- American football
  - Ricky Williams returns after a one-year absence to the NFL's Miami Dolphins.
- Cricket: The Ashes: Australia (190 & 384) beat England (155 & 180) by 239 runs in the first Test at Lord's. (BBC)
- Football (Soccer):
  - CONCACAF Gold Cup Final (AP/Yahoo!)
    - USA 0–0 Panama (aet, 3–1 on penalties)
  - Internazionale will proceed with their planned pre-season tour of England, reversing their decision from the previous day to cancel the tour due to security concerns related to this month's bombings in London. (BBC)
- Auto racing
  - Formula One: German Grand Prix – Fernando Alonso wins the event, his sixth this season, over Juan Pablo Montoya and Jenson Button. (Formula1.com)
  - NASCAR: Pennsylvania 500 – Kurt Busch won the event lengthened by three laps because of a caution, and ending under another yellow flag. (NASCAR.com)
  - IndyCar: A. J. Foyt 225 – Sam Hornish Jr. of Team Penske is the winner, holding off Dario Franchitti in the race held in Milwaukee, Wisconsin. (Indycar.com)
- Cycling: Tour de France
  - Stage 21, Corbeil-Essonnes to Paris (Champs-Élysées), 144 km (89 mi). Lance Armstrong wins his seventh and final Tour. Due to rain in Paris, the Tour organisers exercised their option to take the time for general classification purposes at the first entrance to the Champs-Élysées. The riders continued to race for the stage win and its associated time bonuses and points. Alexander Vinokourov wins the stage and a 20-second time bonus, allowing him to pass Levi Leipheimer for fifth place overall, after escaping from the peloton with 2 km left. Armstrong's overall time is 86h 15m 02s. The rest of the top ten of the general classification are Ivan Basso at +4m 40s, Jan Ullrich at +6m 21s, Francisco Mancebo at +9m 59s, Vinokourov at +11m 01s, Leipheimer at +11m 21s, Michael Rasmussen at +11m 33s; however, Rasmussen was the overall winner of the mountains classification. The remainder of the top ten in the General Classification was Cadel Evans at +11m 55s, Floyd Landis at +12m 44s and Óscar Pereiro at +16m 14s. Thor Hushovd wins the points classification, Yaroslav Popovych wins the young rider classification top rider under age 25, and T-Mobile won the team classification. (LeTour.com)

== 23 July 2005 (Saturday) ==
- Cycling: Tour de France
  - Stage 20, Individual time trial, 55.5 km, starting and finishing in Saint-Étienne. In the Tour's penultimate stage Michael Rasmussen suffers a disastrous performance, losing his overall third place following a fall after 3 km, requiring four bike changes, and then crashing into a ditch. Lance Armstrong wins his first stage of this Tour, the twenty-second of his career, in 1h 11m 46s. Jan Ullrich was 23 seconds slower but moves up the General Classification. In the GC, Lance Armstrong leads the parade toward Paris tomorrow in 82h 34m 05s, followed by Ivan Basso in +4m 40s, Jan Ullrich in +6m 21s, Francisco Mancebo in +9m 59s, Levi Leipheimer in +11m 25s, Alexander Vinokourov in +11m 27s, Michael Rasmussen plummets from 3rd to 7th in +11m 33s, Cadel Evans in +11m 55s, Floyd Landis in +12m 44s and Óscar Pereiro in +16m 04s. (Le Tour)
- Golf:
  - LPGA rookie Paula Creamer wins the Evian Masters, a tournament in France co-sanctioned with the Ladies European Tour and a major on the latter tour. The 18-year-old Creamer cruised to an eight-stroke victory over Michelle Wie and Lorena Ochoa. (AP/Yahoo!)

== 22 July 2005 (Friday) ==
- Auto racing:
  - Formula One: All seven Michelin teams are cleared of wrongdoing after the two "guilty" verdicts against them from the instances of the 2005 United States Grand Prix are overturned. (F1.Racing-Live.com)
- Ice hockey
  - The National Hockey League board of governors unanimously ratifies the new NHL Collective Bargaining Agreement, formally ending the lockout that cancelled the 2004–05 NHL season. The league unveiled a new version of their logo, made sweeping rules changes, many adopted by the American Hockey League in 2004 to bring increased offense to the game, and held a draft lottery to determine the selection order for the July 30 Draft in Ottawa, Ontario, with the Pittsburgh Penguins winning the right to select Sidney Crosby first overall. NHL.com web site
- Cycling: Tour de France
  - Stage 19, 153.5 km (95.4 mi) from Issoire to Le Puy-en-Velay. A four-man group which broke away after 34 km made it all the way to the finish. Giuseppe Guerini (T-Mobile team) won in 3h 33m 04s, his second TdF stage win after Alpe d'Huez in 1999, followed within 10 seconds by Sandy Casar, Franco Pellizotti and Óscar Pereiro. In the provisional General Classification this stage pushes Óscar Pereiro into 10th place overall, the procession still being led by Lance Armstrong (81h 22m 19s), followed by Ivan Basso at +2m 46s, Michael Rasmussen at +3, 46s, Jan Ullrich at +5m 58s, Francisco Mancebo at +7m 08, Levi Leipheimer at +8m 12s, Cadel Evans at +9m 49s, Alexander Vinokourov at +10m 11s, Floyd Landis at 10m 42s and Pereiro Sio at 12m 39s. Saturday's stage is the 55.5 km individual time trial starting and ending in Saint-Étienne. (Le Tour)

== 21 July 2005 (Thursday) ==
- Ice hockey
  - The National Hockey League lockout officially ends as the NHLPA votes in favor of the new collective bargaining agreement by an 87–13% margin.(AP/ESPN)
- Basketball
  - Flip Saunders is named the new head coach of the NBA's Detroit Pistons. (AP/ESPN)
- Cycling: Tour de France
  - Stage 18, 189.0 km from Albi to Mende. In the stage ending on the airport runway at Mende, Marcos Serrano wins the stage in 4h 37m 36s, followed by Cédric Vasseur and Axel Merckx 27 seconds later. Cadel Evans, Lance Armstrong, Ivan Basso and Jan Ullrich finish in 11th–14th places at +11m 18s, followed by Alexander Vinokourov, Michael Rasmussen, Levi Leipheimer and Francisco Mancebo at +11m 55s. With only four stages remaining, the General Classification is Armstrong 3,254.5 km in 77h 44m 44s (average 41.664 km/h), followed by Basso at +2m 46s, Rasmussen at +3m 46s, Ullrich at +5m 58s, Mancebo at +7m 08s, Leipheimer at +8m 12s, Evans at +9m 49s, Vinokourov at +10m 11s, Floyd Landis at +10m 42s, and Christophe Moreau at +13m 15s. Rasmussen is confirmed at the winner of the King of the Mountains competition, however, he must finish the race in Paris on Sunday to officially claim the title. (Le Tour)
- Tennis
  - India's no. 1 female tennis player Sania Mirza crashes out of the $170,000 WTA Tour tennis event in Cincinnati, USA, losing to Japan's Akiko Morigami in the quarterfinals. (Hindu) (Times of India)

== 20 July 2005 (Wednesday) ==
- American football
  - Tedy Bruschi of the NFL's New England Patriots will sit out the 2005 season as he recovers from a stroke he suffered on February 18.
- Football: UEFA Champions League 2005–06 First Qualifying round, second leg. Progressing teams indicated in **bold**.
  - Pyunik 2 – 2 **Haka** (UEFA.com)
  - **Tirana** 3 – 0 Gorica (UEFA.com)
  - Hafnarfjörður 1 – 2 **Neftchi** (UEFA.com)
  - **Artmedia Bratislava** 4 – 1 Kairat Almaty (a.e.t.) (UEFA.com)
  - Skonto Riga 1 – 0 **Rabotnički** (UEFA.com)
  - **Shelbourne** 4 – 1 Glentoran (UEFA.com)
  - **Anorthosis Famagusta** 1 – 0 Dinamo Minsk (UEFA.com)
  - **Sheriff Tiraspol** 2 – 0 Sliema Wanderers (UEFA.com)
  - NK Zrinjski 0 – 4 **F91 Dudelange** (a.e.t.) (UEFA.com)
- Cycling: Tour de France
  - Stage 17, 239.5 km from Pau to Revel, Haute-Garonne. Seventeen riders break away from the peloton early in the stage, opening a lead of up to 25 minutes. At the end of the stage Paolo Savoldelli beats Kurt Asle Arvesen with the last turn of the pedals. The peloton arrives 22 minutes 28 seconds after Savoldelli, including Lance Armstrong, Ivan Basso and Michael Rasmussen. The General Classification leaders are unchanged. (Le Tour)

== 19 July 2005 (Tuesday) ==
- Basketball
  - The Detroit Pistons of the National Basketball Association release coach Larry Brown from the final three years of his contract, allowing him to move to the New York Knicks nine days later.
- Football: UEFA Champions League 2005–06 First Qualifying round, second leg. Progressing teams indicated in **bold**.
  - **FBK Kaunas** 4 – 0 HB Tórshavn (UEFA.com)
  - **Dinamo Tbilisi** 2 – 0 Levadia Tallinn (UEFA.com)
  - TNS 0 – 3 **Liverpool** (UEFA.com)
- Cycling: Tour de France
  - Stage 16, 180.5 km from Mourenx to Pau. Óscar Pereiro of Phonak wins the stage in a time of 4h38:40. The stage featured one hors categorie climb, the Col d'Aubisque, won by Australian Cadel Evans of Davitamon–Lotto.
  - In the general classification, Lance Armstrong keeps the yellow jersey as leader of the general classification and remains 2:46 up of Ivan Basso. By virtue of his finish today, Evans moves to 7th in the general classification, 9:29 back of the Texan. The other jerseys remain the same as well: maillot vert for the leader in the points classification stays with Thor Hushovd, maillot á pois for the leader of the mountains classification remains on the back of Michael Rasmussen, and Yaroslav Popovych retains the maillot blanc for best rider under the age of 25. (Le Tour) (OLN)
- Formula One
  - The Minardi team announce that Robert Doornbos will replace Patrick Friesacher for the remainder of the 2005 season due to sponsorship issues. (Minardi press release) (F1.com)

== 18 July 2005 (Monday) ==
- Major League Baseball
  - The New York Yankees reclaimed the top position in the American League's Eastern Division by defeating the Texas Rangers 11–10 in a slugfest at Ameriquest Field in Arlington, while the Boston Red Sox were beaten by the Tampa Bay Devil Rays, 3–1 at Fenway Park.
- Cycling
  - Elite cyclist and former Olympic rower Amy Gillett was killed and five teammates seriously injured when an out of control car runs into the members of the Australian women's national team on a training ride. The riders were due to compete in the Tour of Thuringen. The start of the tour has been delayed until the 21 July as a mark of respect. (BBC)
  - The final rest day for the Tour de France. Action will resume on Tuesday (19 July).

== 17 July 2005 (Sunday) ==
- Major League Baseball
  - The Kansas City Royals defeat the Detroit Tigers 5–0 in a game that is marred by a massive bench-clearing brawl in the sixth inning. It begins when Royals starter Runelvys Hernández hits Tigers batter Carlos Guillén in the helmet with a pitch, the third batter in the game Hernández plunks. The two exchange words, and both benches and dugouts clear. At first, only words are exchanged between the teams. Then, Tigers pitcher Kyle Farnsworth picks up Royals reliever Jeremy Affeldt and slams him to the ground, resulting in exchanged punches. When all is said and done, seven people are ejected — Hernández, Guillén, Farnsworth, Jeremy Bonderman, Emil Brown, Alberto Castillo, and Royals manager Buddy Bell. (Yahoo!)
- Auto racing:
  - NASCAR Nextel Cup: Tony Stewart wins the New Hampshire 300 at the New Hampshire International Speedway in Loudon, his third win in the last four races, after not having won at all this season before this recent stretch. (NASCAR.com)
  - Champ Car World Series: Sébastien Bourdais picks up his second win of the season at the inaugural West Edmonton Mall Grand Prix of Edmonton at the Finning International Speedway in Edmonton. Polesitter A. J. Allmendinger slaps the wall with 8 laps to go while leading, damaging both his left side suspensions. Bourdais now leads Paul Tracy by 21 points in the series standings. If Bourdais holds on in points from here, it will be his second straight series title, and the first time Newman-Haas Racing has ever won back-to-back Champ Car titles. (ChampCarWorldSeries.com)
- Golf: The Open Championship
  - Tiger Woods wins at St Andrews. Challenged early in the final day by Colin Montgomerie and playing partner José María Olazábal, Woods eventually cruises to a five-stroke win over Montgomerie. He becomes only the second golfer, after Jack Nicklaus, to win all four majors more than once. (Opengolf.com)
- Cycling: Tour de France
  - Stage 15, 205.5 km from Lézat-sur-Lèze to Saint-Lary-Soulan. The toughest mountain stage of the whole Tour. A dramatic chase over six mountain passes decimates the peloton as Ivan Basso, Lance Armstrong and Jan Ullrich pursue a breakaway group of six riders up vicious Pyrenean slopes. George Hincapie (Discovery Channel) wins in 6 h 06 min 38 s, becoming the first member of Lance Armstrong's team, other than Armstrong himself, to win a stage since 1999. Óscar Pereiro (Phonak) (+06 s) Pietro Caucchioli (Crédit Agricole) (+38 s), Michael Boogerd (Rabobank) (+57 s) and Laurent Brochard (Bouygues Télécom) (+2 min 19 s) were also in the breakaway. Ivan Basso (CSC) and Lance Armstrong (Discovery Channel) finish 6th and 7th, both in +5 min 04 s, followed by Óscar Sevilla and Jan Ullrich (T-Mobile Team) (both +6 min 28 s) and Michael Rasmussen at +6 min 32 s.
  - In the General Classification, Lance Armstrong picks up yet another yellow jersey in 62 h 09 min 59 s, and Ivan Basso (+2 min 46 s) leapfrogs Michael Rasmussen (+3 min 09 s) into second place. Jan Ullrich is at +5 min 58 s, followed by Francisco Mancebo (+6 min 31 s), Levi Leipheimer (+7 min 35 s), Floyd Landis (+9 min 33 s), Alexander Vinokourov (+9 min 38 s), Christophe Moreau is the leading Frenchman at +11 min 47 s while Andreas Klöden is in 10th place at +12 min 01 s. Monday is a rest day. (Le Tour)

== 16 July 2005 (Saturday) ==
- Auto racing
  - IndyCar Series: Dario Franchitti won the Firestone Indy 200 at Nashville Superspeedway in Lebanon, Tennessee. (indycar.com)
- Boxing
  - In a split decision, Jermain Taylor upset defending champion Bernard Hopkins to win the undisputed middleweight championship in Las Vegas. (AP/ Yahoo! Sports)
  - 2004 Olympics silver-medallist Amir Khan wins his debut professional bout in Bolton.
- Golf: The Open Championship
  - Tiger Woods scrambled to a one-under-par 71 and retain a lead that was reduced to two strokes after three rounds on The Old Course at St Andrews. José María Olazábal was in second place after a two-under-par score of 70. (The Open website)
- Cycling: Tour de France
  - Stage 14, 220.5 km from Agde to Ax-3 Domaines. The Tour enters the Pyrenees, and the stage is won by Georg Totschnig (Gerolsteiner) in 5 h 43 min 43 s, followed 56 seconds later by Lance Armstrong (Discovery Channel) who managed to completely drop the rest of his team. Ivan Basso (Team CSC) finished third in +58 seconds, with Jan Ullrich (T-Mobile) +1 min 16 s, Levi Leipheimer (Gerolsteiner) and Floyd Landis (Phonak) both at +1 min 31 s and Francisco Mancebo (Illes Balears) and Michael Rasmussen (Rabobank) both at +1 min 47 s.
  - In the General Classification, at 55 h 58 min 17 s Lance Armstrong increases his lead over Michael Rasmussen to +1 min 41 s, with Ivan Basso (+2 min 46 s), Jan Ullrich (+4 min 34 s), Levi Leipheimer (+4 min 45 s), Floyd Landis and Francisco Mancebo (both +5 min 03 s), Andreas Klöden (+5 min 38 s), Alexander Vinokourov (+7 min 09 s), and Christophe Moreau (+8 min 37 s). (Le Tour.)
- Poker
  - Lebanese-born Joseph Hachem, a former chiropractor who now resides in Melbourne, Australia, won the richest prize in poker history, $7.5 million (US) at the $10,000 No-Limit Texas Hold 'Em main event at the 2005 World Series of Poker. He defeated investment banker Steve Dannenmann with a 3-to-7 straight on the flop. Dannenmann received $4.5 million as the runner up, and John "Tex" Barch finished third to receive $2.5 million. In all, Hachem outlasted 5,618 other players, an all-time record for a poker tournament. (World Series of Poker website.)

== 15 July 2005 (Friday) ==
- Baseball
  - Rafael Palmeiro of the Baltimore Orioles records the 3,000th hit of his career, an RBI double off of Seattle Mariners pitcher Joel Piñeiro, to become the 26th player to reach the mark. He joins Hank Aaron, Willie Mays, and Eddie Murray as the only players with 3,000 hits and 500 home runs. (AP/ESPN)
- Golf
  - At The Open Championship at The Old Course at St Andrews, Tiger Woods extended his lead in the event to four strokes, this day over sentimental favourite Colin Montgomerie. Jack Nicklaus, in what would turn out to be his final competitive round of golf as a professional, would miss the cut shooting a par 72, but will end his career after a birdie on the 18th hole and a two-round total three strokes over par. Also missing the cut was defending champion Todd Hamilton, shooting two over par. (AP/Yahoo! Sports)
  - Michelle Wie lost her quarter-final match at the U. S. Public Links Men's Championship, and will not qualify for the Masters Tournament in Augusta, Georgia next April. (AP/ESPN)
- Cycling: Tour de France
  - Robbie McEwen (AUS) won Stage 13 from Miramas to Montpellier (173.5 km) in 3:43:24. Lance Armstrong finished 33rd with the same time, and retains the yellow jersey as he keeps a lead of 35 seconds over his competition, Denmark's Michael Rasmussen. (OLN)

== 14 July 2005 (Thursday) ==
- Golf: The Open Championship
  - Tiger Woods leads after the first round at The Old Course at St Andrews with a six-under par 66. Jack Nicklaus, playing in his final competitive event at this year's Open Championship on The Old Course, shot a three-over par 75.(AP/ESPN)
- Baseball
  - The San Francisco Giants defeated their hated rivals, the Los Angeles Dodgers, 4–3, to win their 10,000th game in the club's history, the most of any professional sports franchise.
- Football: UEFA Cup 2005–06 First Qualifying Round, first leg.
  - Baskimi 0 – 0 Zepce
  - Birkirkara 0 – 2 APOEL
  - Sant Julià 0 – 5 Rapid București
  - Teuta 3 – 1 Široki Brijeg
  - Elbasani 1 – 1 Vardar
  - Omonia 3 – 0 Hibernians
  - Domagnano 0 – 5 Domžale
  - Ferencváros 0 – 2 MTZ-RIPO Minsk
  - Banants 2 – 3 Lokomotivi Tbilisi
  - Torpedo Kutaisi 0 – 1 BATE Borisov
  - Vaduz 2 – 0 Dacia Chişinău
  - Baku 1 – 0 Žilina
  - Mainz 05 4 – 0 MIKA
  - Nistru Otaci 3 – 1 Khazar Lenkoran
  - Longford Town 2 – 0 Carmarthen Town
  - Ekranas 0 – 2 Cork City
  - ÍBV 1 – 1 B36
  - Allianssi 3 – 0 Pétange
  - Linfield 1 – 0 Ventspils
  - NSÍ 0 – 3 Metalurgs
  - Etzella 0 – 4 Keflavik
  - Portadown 1 – 2 Viking Stavanger
  - TVMK 1 – 1 MyPa
  - Rhyl 2 – 1 Atlantas
  - EfB 1 – 2 Flora Tallinn
- Cycling: Tour de France
  - Stage 12 of the Tour, 187 km from Briançon to Digne les Bains. Before the stage begins, points classification leader Tom Boonen withdraws from the race following his fall in yesterday's stage. 166 riders remain in the race. Appropriately for Bastille Day, the stage is won by a Frenchman, David Moncoutié (Cofidis) in 4 hr 20 min 06 sec, followed by Sandy Casar (Française Des Jeux), Ángel Vicioso (LSW), Patrice Halgand (Crédit Agricole), José Luis Arrieta, Franco Pellizotti and Axel Merckx, all at +57 secs. The General Classification remains unchanged, Lance Armstrong finished in the peloton in 41st place, 10 mins 32 seconds behind Moncoutié. (Le Tour)

== 13 July 2005 (Wednesday) ==
- Ice hockey: NHL labor dispute
  - The National Hockey League and its players' union, the NHL Players Association, have reached a deal on a new collective bargaining agreement that will end the league's 10-month lockout. The six-year agreement is subject to approval by the NHLPA membership on 21 July and the league's Board of Governors (owners) on 22 July. (TSN)
- Football: UEFA Champions League 2005–06 – First Qualifying Round, first leg
  - Haka 1 – 0 Pyunik (UEFA.com)
  - Dudelange 0 – 1 Zrinjski (UEFA.com)
  - Glentoran 1 – 2 Shelbourne (UEFA.com)
  - HB Tórshavn 2 – 4 Kaunas (UEFA.com)
  - Liverpool 3 – 0 TNS (UEFA.com)
  - Gorica 2 – 0 Tirana (UEFA.com)
- Cycling: 2005 Tour de France
  - Stage 11 of the Tour, 173 km from Courchevel to Briançon. Before the stage begins, Italian rider Dario Frigo is excluded and arrested when performance-enhancing drugs are discovered in his wife's car. In the first stage to have not one but two "hors catégorie" climbs (the highest categorisation for mountains, indicating maximum difficulty), the Col de la Madeleine (2000 m) and the Col du Galibier (2645 m – the highest point of this year's Tour) T-Mobile's Kazakh rider Alexander Vinokourov wins in a sprint, just ahead of Colombian Santiago Botero. Lance Armstrong's group finishes one minute and a quarter behind, so the American keeps the yellow jersey, while its former wearer, Jens Voigt of CSC is eliminated for not finishing within the time limit.
  - Armstrong remains 38 seconds ahead of Michael Rasmussen (Rabobank), and his next closest rival is Christophe Moreau. The only majorly movement in the general classification is Vinokourov making up some time on the leaders. The other jerseys have not changed hands, and the lanterne rouge, the last placed rider in the race (presently Iker Flores) is more than two and a quarter hours down on Armstrong. (Le Tour)

== 12 July 2005 (Tuesday) ==
- Baseball: MLB All-Star Game
  - American League 7 — National League 5. Miguel Tejada (Orioles, Alabama) is named All-Star Game MVP.
- Football: UEFA Champions League 2005–06 – First Qualifying Round, first leg
  - Levadia Tallinn 1 – 0 Dinamo Tbilisi (UEFA.com)
  - Dinamo Minsk 1 – 1 Anorthosis Famagusta (UEFA.com)
  - Neftchi 2 – 0 FH Hafnarfjörður (UEFA.com)
  - Kairat Almaty 2 – 0 Artmedia Bratislava (UEFA.com)
  - Rabotnički 6 – 0 Skonto Riga (UEFA.com)
  - Sliema Wanderers 1 – 4 Sheriff Tiraspol (UEFA.com)
- Cycling: Tour de France
  - Stage 10 of the Tour, 181 km from Grenoble to Courchevel. In the first stage to have a mountain finish Team Discovery Channel powers Lance Armstrong back into the yellow jersey. Alejandro Valverde (IBA) wins the stage with Armstrong recording the same time. Michael Rasmussen finished nine seconds later. In the General Classification, Armstrong now leads at 37 hours 11 minutes 04 seconds, followed by Rasmussen (+38 sec), Ivan Basso (+2 min 40 sec), Christophe Moreau (+2 min 42 sec), Valverde (+3 min 16 sec), Levi Leipheimer (+3 min 58 sec), Francisco Mancebo (+4 min 00 sec), and Jan Ullrich (+4 min 02 sec). (Guardian), (Le Tour)

== 11 July 2005 (Monday) ==
- Baseball: Home Run Derby
  - Bobby Abreu, representing his home country of Venezuela and the Philadelphia Phillies, hits a record 24 home runs in the first round and a total of 41 to win the annual contest at Detroit's Comerica Park.
- Cycling: Tour de France
  - A rest day. Action would resume the next day.

== 10 July 2005 (Sunday) ==
- Golf:
  - Champions Tour: Peter Jacobsen records his second senior major victory in the Senior Players Championship with an overall score of 15-under. (PGATOUR.com)
  - PGA Tour: Sean O'Hair records his first-ever PGA Tour win in the John Deere Classic with an overall tournament score of 16-under, defeating runners-up Robert Damron and Hank Kuehne, who finish at 15-under. (PGATOUR.com)
- Auto racing:
  - NASCAR Nextel Cup: Dale Earnhardt Jr. shakes himself out of a slump and wins the USG Sheetrock 400 at Chicagoland Speedway in Joliet, Illinois.
  - Formula One: Juan Pablo Montoya wins the 2005 British Grand Prix, defeating Fernando Alonso and Montoya's McLaren Mercedes teammate Kimi Räikkönen. (Formula1.com)
  - Champ Car World Series: Former Formula One driver Justin Wilson record his first-ever Champ Car win in the Molson Indy Toronto. (ChampCarWorldSeries.com)
- Cycling: Tour de France
  - Stage 9 of the Tour, 171 km from Gerardmer to Mulhouse. After a breakaway of 167 kilometres, Michael Rasmussen (Rabobank) wins the stage in 4 hours 8 minutes 20 seconds, 3 minutes 4 seconds ahead of Christophe Moreau (Crédit Agricole) and Jens Voigt (Team CSC) who takes the yellow jersey as leader of the general classification from Lance Armstrong. The peloton arrives 6 minutes 4 seconds after Rasmussen. The first yellow jersey wearer of this year's race, David Zabriskie (Team CSC) retires because of the injuries he sustained in his fall in the time trial in stage 4. Rasmussen also substantially extends his lead in the King of the Mountains competition, winning all 30 points on the Ballon d'Alsace for the mountains classification. In the General Classification, Voigt now leads at 32 hours 18 minutes 23 seconds, followed by Moreau (+1 min 50 sec), Armstrong (+2 min 18 sec), Rasmussen (+2 min 43 sec), Alexander Vinokourov (+3 min 20 sec) and Bobby Julich (+3 min 25 sec). Monday is a rest day. (Le Tour)

== 9 July 2005 (Saturday) ==
- Boxing:
  - Héctor Camacho beats Raúl Muñoz by a ten-round unanimous decision in Tucson, Arizona, and a small riot takes place after the fight. Julio César Chávez had to be escorted off the fight's arena by security. Héctor Camacho Jr. also wins a fight. fightnews.com
- Cycling: Tour de France
  - Stage 8 of the Tour, 231.5 km from Pforzheim, Germany to Gérardmer, ends in an apparent photographic dead heat between Pieter Weening (Rabobank) and Andreas Klöden (T-Mobile Team) in 5 hours 3 minutes 54 seconds, eventually awarded to Weening by .0002 of a second, the smallest victory margin ever. Jan Ullrich (T-Mobile Team) finished in 6th place.
  - In the General Classification Lance Armstrong (Discovery Channel) still leads in 28 hours 6 minutes 17 seconds (earning his 71st yellow jersey, the 78-day record of Bernard Hinault looking increasingly approachable), followed 1 minute later by Jens Voigt (Team CSC), Alexander Vinokourov (T-Mobile Team) 1 minute 2 seconds behind Armstrong, and Bobby Julich (Team CSC) 1 minute 7 seconds behind the leader.
  - Two other jerseys changed hands today: Michael Rasmussen of Rabobank will wear the polkadot jersey as leader of the mountains classification, and Yaroslav Popovych loses the white jersey for the young rider classification in the Tour de France to Vladimir Karpets of Illes Balears by one second.(BBC) (Le Tour)
- Rugby union: The British & Irish Lions' tour of New Zealand ends with a 38–19 defeat by the All Blacks in Auckland. The All Blacks sweep the three-Test series 3–0, leaving the Lions without a Test win for the first time since their 1983 tour of New Zealand. (BBC)

== 8 July 2005 (Friday) ==
- Golf:
  - Michelle Wie misses the cut at the PGA Tour John Deere Classic, held in Silvis, Illinois. Wie shot a 70 in the second round, preventing her from becoming the first female golfer in tour history to play into the weekend. (AP/Yahoo!)
- Olympics:
  - Baseball and softball will be dropped from the Olympic docket of sports in time for the 2012 Summer Olympics in London. Two of the sports being considered to replace them are golf and rugby sevens. However, IOC president Jacques Rogge says these sports are not gone from the Games forever. Update: squash and karate were nominated to replace baseball and softball, but did not get the 2/3 majority needed to become Olympic sports. (Yahoo! Asia)
- Cycling: Tour de France
  - On the day that saw the Tour de France divert into Germany, Stage 7 between Lunéville and Karlsruhe was won in a disorganised sprint finish by Robbie McEwen, with Magnus Bäckstedt second and Bernhard Eisel third. Tom Boonen had his worst sprint finish so far, finishing in seventh place. The big names finished in the peloton, losing no time, Jan Ullrich in 45th place, Lance Armstrong in 53rd place, and Alexander Vinokourov in 65th place. Armstrong and George Hincapie are still in first and second, Hincapie being 55 seconds back, with Vinokourov third, 62 seconds behind Armstrong in the GC. (BBC)

== 7 July 2005 (Thursday) ==
- Football (soccer):
  - 2005 CONCACAF Gold Cup:

Canada 0–1 Costa Rica
Cuba 1–4 USA

- Cycling: Tour de France
  - On a day that saw a driving rainstorm which led to several large pile-ups, including one with 500 meters to go, Italian Lorenzo Bernucci of Fassa Bortolo was able to escape the crashes and come in first in Stage 6 of the Tour de France. Lance Armstrong and George Hincapie are still in first and second, Hincapie being 55 seconds back, but a strong second-place finish in today's stage from Alexander Vinokourov puts him in third in the GC. (OLN)
- Ice hockey:
  - Both the National Hockey League and its players' union have denied a report in today's Los Angeles Times that they have reached a deal on a new collective bargaining agreement that will end the league's current lockout. (AP/ESPN)

== 6 July 2005 (Wednesday) ==
- Football (soccer):
  - 2005 CONCACAF Gold Cup:

Colombia 0–1 Panama
Trinidad and Tobago 1–1 Honduras

- Olympics:
  - The International Olympic Committee names London, UK as the site of the 2012 Summer Olympics. (BBC) (ABC) (CNN)
- Cycling: Tour de France
  - Amid cold and windy conditions, Australian Robbie McEwen was the winner of Stage 5 of the Tour de France, beating green jersey rivals Tom Boonen and Thor Hushovd at the finish. In the general classification, Lance Armstrong retains the yellow jersey and his 55-second cushion over his teammate and countryman George Hincapie. (BBC)

== 5 July 2005 (Tuesday) ==
- Cycling: Tour de France
  - In the fastest team time trial ever, Team Discovery Channel wins Stage 4 of the Tour de France, between Tours and Blois, in a record 1:10:39, 2 seconds ahead of Team CSC. Lance Armstrong takes the yellow jersey away from David Zabriskie, who suffered a crash just outside the 1 km-to go marker. Lance's Discovery Channel teammate, George Hincapie, is 2nd, 55 seconds back. Zabriskie is now ninth, more than a minute back of the six-time champion. (BBC) (Le Tour)

== 4 July 2005 (Monday) ==
- Cycling: Tour de France
  - Tom Boonen of Belgium wins stage 3 of the Tour de France, sprinting past his rivals on the line. Robbie McEwen, who finished 3rd was relegated to 186th place by the commissaires for hindering Stuart O'Grady's line in the sprint finish. David Zabriskie retains the yellow jersey for a third day, retaining a 2-second lead over Lance Armstrong. (BBC)

== 3 July 2005 (Sunday) ==
- Cycling: Tour de France
  - Tom Boonen of Belgium wins the first stage proper (stage 2) of the Tour de France, sprinting past his rivals on the line. He thus takes Armstrong's Green Jersey while Zabriskie retains the yellow jersey as leader of the general classification. An attack by last year's hero, Thomas Voeckler, puts him in the King of the Mountains jersey.
- Tennis: Wimbledon
  - Roger Federer wins his third successive Wimbledon Gentlemen's Singles championship, defeating second seed Andy Roddick 6–2 7–6(2) 6–4. (BBC Sport)
  - Cara Black and Liezel Huber defeat Svetlana Kuznetsova and Amélie Mauresmo 6–2 6–1 to win the Ladies' Doubles. (BBC)
  - Mahesh Bhupathi and Mary Pierce win the Mixed Doubles over Paul Hanley and Tatiana Perebiynis, 6–4 6–2. (Wimbledon.org – official site)
- Auto racing:
  - Formula One: Fernando Alonso wins the 2005 French Grand Prix at Magny-Cours, leading every single lap. (Formula1.com)
  - NASCAR: In a race that ends well into the morning because of a rain delay, Tony Stewart picks up his second straight Nextel Cup Series victory by winning the Pepsi 400 at the Daytona International Speedway in Florida. (NASCAR.com)

== 2 July 2005 (Saturday) ==
- Cycling: Tour de France
  - The 2005 Tour de France starts from Noirmoutier, in France's Vendée region. The 19.5 km opening time trial is won by American David Zabriskie, with hot favourite Lance Armstrong (also USA) in second place – thus taking the year's first Green Jersey. This is the second successive time Armstrong has done this.
- Tennis: Wimbledon
  - Venus Williams wins the Ladies' Singles for the third time, defeating fellow American Lindsay Davenport 4–6 7–6(4) 9–7. The match is the longest women's final by time in the history of the tournament, lasting 2:45. (BBC)
  - In the completion of the suspended Gentlemen's semifinal, Andy Roddick defeats Thomas Johansson 6–7(6) 6–2 7–6(10) 7–6(5). Roddick will face Roger Federer in the Men's final on Sunday. (BBC Sport)
  - Stephen Huss (Australia) and Wesley Moodie (South Africa) defeat American twins Bob and Mike Bryan 7–6(4) 6–3 6–7(2) 6–3 to win the Gentlemen's Doubles. They become the first qualifiers ever to win this event at Wimbledon. (BBC)
- Boxing
  - Mexican super lightweight Martin Sánchez dies of injuries sustained in his July 1 bout against Rustam Nugaev of Russia. Nugaev had knocked out Sanchez in the ninth round of their Las Vegas match at the Orleans Hotel and Casino. Sanchez walked out of the ring under his own power, but was rushed into surgery after showing signs of brain damage. MSNBC.
- Cricket
  - Australia and England share the NatWest Series trophy after a crowd-pleaser at Lord's. Both sides made 196, England scoring two leg byes off the last ball to tie the game, after being 33 for 5.
- Rugby union:
  - In the second Test of the British & Irish Lions tour of New Zealand, the Lions are resoundingly defeated by the All Blacks 48–18. With the win, the All Blacks clinch a series win. Fly-half Dan Carter scores 33 of the All Blacks' points, a record for an All Blacks player against the Lions. (BBC)
  - Australia defeat France 37–31 in a one-off Test in Brisbane. (BBC)

== 1 July 2005 (Friday) ==
- Major League Baseball
  - Kenny Rogers is suspended for 20 games and fined an undisclosed amount for his tirade that sent cameraman Larry Rodriguez to the hospital on Wednesday. (Yahoo!)
- Tennis
  - Today's first match at Wimbledon was the conclusion of the Davenport vs. Mauresmo match. Davenport prevailed despite a fight from Mauresmo, 6–7(5) 7–6(4) 6–4. In the Men's semi-final World #1 Roger Federer defeated World #2 Lleyton Hewitt in straight sets 6–3 6–4 7–6(5) in a very powerful performance from the top seed. (BBC Sport)
