= 2005 County Championship =

English cricket tournament

- Dates: 13 April – 24 September 2005
- Administrator: England and Wales Cricket Board
- Cricket format: First-class cricket (4 days)
- Tournament format: League system
- Champions: Nottinghamshire (5th title)
- Participants: 18
- Matches: 144
- Most runs: Ed Joyce (1,668 for Middlesex)
- Most wickets: Mushtaq Ahmed (80 for Sussex)

The 2005 County Championship season, known as the Frizzell County Championship for sponsorship reasons, was contested through two divisions: Division One and Division Two. Each team played all the others in their division both home and away. The top three teams from Division Two were promoted to the first division for 2006, while the bottom three teams from Division 1 were relegated.

== Teams ==
Teams in the County Championship 2005:

Division One	Division Two
Glamorgan	Derbyshire
Gloucestershire	Durham
Hampshire	Essex
Kent	Lancashire
Middlesex	Leicestershire
Nottinghamshire	Northamptonshire
Surrey	Somerset
Sussex	Worcestershire
Warwickshire	Yorkshire

Icon
Team promoted from Division Two
Team relegated from Division One

== Points system ==
- 14 points for a win
- 6 points for a tie
- 4 points for a draw
- 4 points for an abandoned game
- A maximum of 5 batting bonus points and 3 bowling bonus points

== Standings ==
=== Division One ===
	Team	P	W	L	D	Bat	Bowl	Ded	Pts
1	Nottinghamshire	16	9	3	4	50	44	0	236
2	Hampshire	16	9	3	4	46	46	0.5	233.5
3	Sussex	16	7	3	6	57	45	1	223
4	Warwickshire	16	8	5	3	42	44	0.5	209.5
5	Kent	16	6	3	7	56	43	8.5	202.5
6	Middlesex	16	4	5	7	56	42	0.5	181.5
7	Surrey	16	4	3	9	53	44	8.5	180.5
8	Gloucestershire	16	1	10	5	26	46	2	104
9	Glamorgan	16	1	14	1	33	38	0.5	88.5

= Champions
= Relegated

=== Division Two ===
	Team	P	W	L	D	Bat	Bowl	Ded	Pts
1	Lancashire	16	7	3	6	43	47	0	212
2	Durham	16	6	2	8	45	44	0	205
3	Yorkshire	16	5	1	10	49	42	0.5	200.5
4	Northamptonshire	16	5	3	8	45	46	0	193
5	Essex	16	5	4	7	51	36	1.5	183.5
6	Worcestershire	16	5	7	4	53	46	5.5	179.5
7	Leicestershire	16	3	6	7	45	45	0.5	159.5
8	Somerset	16	4	7	5	42	37	0	155
9	Derbyshire	16	1	8	7	31	43	0	116

= Champions
= Promoted

== Records ==
Most runs
Aggregate	Average	Player	County
1,668	61.77	Ed Joyce	Middlesex
1,650	63.46	Owais Shah	Middlesex
1,568	74.66	Mark Ramprakash	Surrey
1,556	59.84	Rob Key	Kent
1,477	61.54	Ben Smith	Worcestershire
1,425	59.37	Anthony McGrath	Yorkshire
1,380	57.50	Murray Goodwin	Sussex
1,369	44.16	David Hemp	Glamorgan
1,359	64.71	Phil Jaques	Yorkshire
1,345	56.04	Martin Love	Northamptonshire

Most wickets
Aggregate	Average	Player	County
80	26.73	Mushtaq Ahmed	Sussex
64	30.64	Deon Kruis	Yorkshire
60	30.21	James Anderson	Lancashire
59	24.61	James Kirtley	Sussex
59	27.55	Min Patel	Kent
58	25.96	Graeme Welch	Derbyshire
57	25.22	Alan Richardson	Middlesex
56	20.80	Mark Ealham	Nottinghamshire
55	28.20	Jason Brown	Northamptonshire
55	28.27	Amjad Khan	Kent

== See also ==
- 2005 Cheltenham & Gloucester Trophy
- 2005 totesport League
- 2005 Twenty20 Cup
