= 2005 English cricket season =

County Championship
- Champions: Nottinghamshire
- Runners-up: Hampshire
- Most runs: Ed Joyce (1,668)
- Most wickets: Mushtaq Ahmed (80)

Cheltenham & Gloucester Trophy
- Champions: Hampshire Hawks
- Runners-up: Warwickshire Bears
- Most runs: Nick Knight (435)
- Most wickets: Neil Carter (14)

totesport League
- Champions: Essex Eagles
- Runners-up: Middlesex Crusaders
- Most runs: Paul Weekes (785)
- Most wickets: James Kirtley (31)

Twenty20 Cup
- Champions: Somerset Sabres
- Runners-up: Lancashire Lightning
- Most runs: Owais Shah (410)
- Most wickets: Nayan Doshi (17)

PCA Player of the Year
- Andrew Flintoff

Wisden Cricketers of the Year
- Matthew Hoggard; Simon Jones; Brett Lee; Kevin Pietersen; Ricky Ponting

The 2005 English cricket season was the 106th in which the County Championship had been an official competition. Before it began, a resurgent England cricket team had won four Test series in a row, going unbeaten through the 2004 calendar year. The start of the international season saw England defeat Bangladesh 2–0 in their two-match series, winning both Tests by an innings. This was followed by a tri-nations one-day tournament that also featured Australia. Australia still started the Test series as favourites but most fans expected England to put up a challenge.

Despite losing the first Test by 239 runs. England came back to win the second and fourth Tests, and draw the third and fifth, to win the Ashes for the first time since 1986–87. It was the 72nd test series between the two teams with England finally winning 2-1. Andrew Flintoff dominated with both bat and ball for England, scoring 402 runs – more than any Australian – and taking 24 wickets – more than any Australian bar Shane Warne. Warne also had a spectacular series, with 40 wickets at a bowling average of 19.92, and 249 runs, but most of his efforts came in losing causes – such as making 42 with the bat in the second innings of the second Test.

In domestic cricket, Nottinghamshire won the County Championship, for the first time since 1987, and Durham enjoyed promotion in both the shorter and the longer form of the game. Surrey, the 2000 and 2002 Championship winners, were relegated in the Championship, and played in Division Two in both the Championship and the National League in 2006. Hampshire Hawks won the 50-over knock-out C&G Trophy, but were relegated in the National League, which Essex Eagles won in emphatic fashion, as they lost only one game and had a 14-point gap to the runners-up, Middlesex Crusaders.

The Australian women also toured England at the same time as the men, and England won the Women's Ashes 1–0 after two Tests. However, the Australian women won the ODI series 3–2. To round off the season, investors in partnership with Leicestershire arranged an International 20:20 Club Championship, which Pakistani team Faisalabad Wolves won.

== Roll of honour ==
Test series:

- England beat Bangladesh 2–0 over two Tests.
- England regained the Ashes, beating Australia 2–1.

ODI series:

- England and Australia shared the NatWest Series (a tri-nations tournament also featuring Bangladesh).
- Australia beat England 2–1 in the three-match ODI NatWest Challenge.

Twenty20 International:

- England beat Australia in the one Twenty20 International that was played.

County Championship:

- Division One winners: Nottinghamshire - Division Two winners: Lancashire

Totesport (one-day) League:

- Division One winners: Essex Eagles - Division Two winners: Sussex Sharks

C&G Trophy:

- Winners: Hampshire - Runners-up: Warwickshire

Twenty20 Cup:

- Winners: Somerset Sabres - Runners-up: Lancashire Lightning

Minor Counties Championship

- Winners: Cheshire and Suffolk shared title

MCCA Knockout Trophy

- Winners: Norfolk beat Wiltshire by six wickets

Second XI Championship

- Winners: Kent II - Runners-up: Gloucestershire II

Second XI Trophy

- Winners: Sussex II beat Essex II by eight wickets

Wisden

- Five Players: Matthew Hoggard, Simon Jones, Brett Lee, Kevin Pietersen, Ricky Ponting

International 20:20 Club Championship:

- Winners: Faisalabad Wolves - Runners-up: Chilaw Marians

Women's Tests:

- England beat Australia 1–0 in the two Test series to win the Ashes for the first time since 1963

Women's ODIs:

- Australia beat England 3–2 in the five-match series

Women's Twenty20 Internationals:

- Australia beat England in the one Twenty20 International that was played

Under-19s "Tests":

- England beat Sri Lanka 3–0 in the three-match series

Under-19s "ODIs":

- England beat Sri Lanka 2–0 in the three-match series

== Ashes tour ==
Cumulative record - Test wins	1876-2005
England	97
Australia	126
Drawn	88

== Month by Month review ==
=== April ===
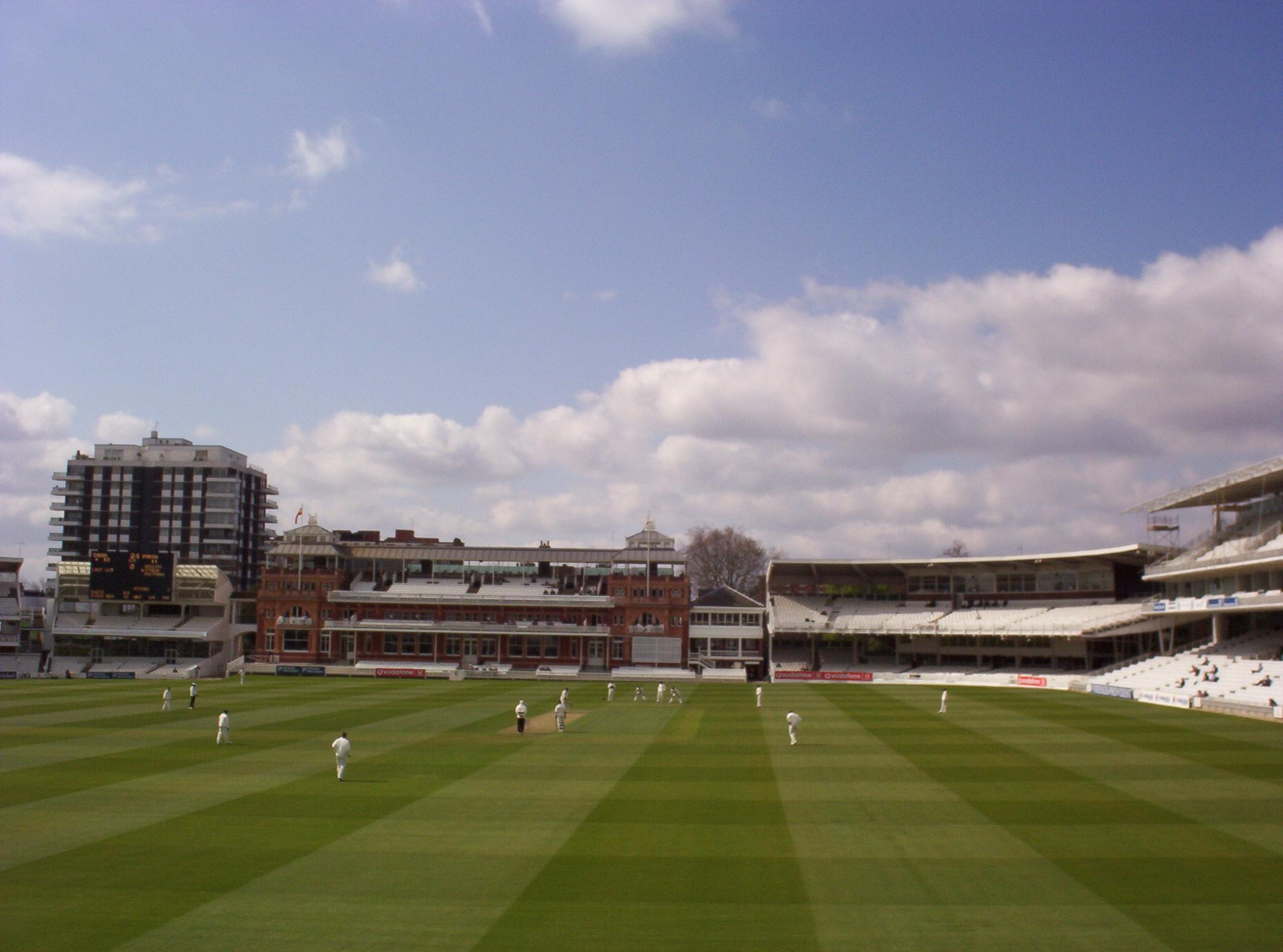
Heath Streak of Warwickshire about to bowl to Cook on 10 April.

The cricket season started early, on 8 April, with MCC playing the Champion County, or at least it would have done if the rain had not delayed the start till the next day. The other games played were all between the first-class counties and university teams. The first matches showed a bumper crop of centuries, with little joy for bowlers, but there were no surprises. The MCC ended up beating Warwickshire.

Away from the cricket field, on 8 April the ECB announced that triangular One Day International tournaments would no longer be played in England. On 11 April Kevin Pietersen, England's South African-born all-rounder was reported to have a foot injury that could see him miss the start of the season, and Chris Schofield began his case for unfair dismissal against Lancashire, which he eventually won.

The first round of the Frizzell County Championship saw Warwickshire gain maximum points, with Hampshire also winning in Division One. Durham replicated Warwickshire's feat in Division Two, where Worcestershire also won.

The first round of the totesport National Cricket League was held on 17 April, though most of the games were affected by the rain. 5 results were possible in the 8 matches. Rain continued to bedevil the second round of the County Championship, with only Yorkshire and Durham securing wins. In the MCC University matches, Bradford/Leeds UCCE shocked an injury-weakened Surrey by beating them at the Oval.

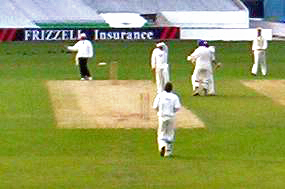
Bradford/Leeds UCCE celebrate after beating Surrey

The second round of the totesport League saw a heavy defeat for Surrey away to Durham, with other wins for Northamptonshire, Middlesex, Kent and Sussex, which left Middlesex and Durham at the top of the tables at the end of April.

In the third round of the Championship, Surrey thrashed what already appear to be Division One whipping boys Glamorgan to go third, with Nottinghamshire and Warwickshire also recording big wins to go second and first respectively. In the second division, Essex and Lancashire beat Somerset and Worcestershire respectively. However, Durham, who sat this round out, led the table at the end of April, from Essex and Worcestershire, with Derbyshire and Leicestershire propping the table up.

=== May ===
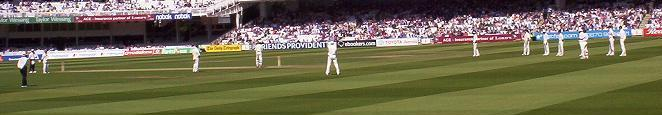
England set a very attacking field against Bangladesh on the third day of the first Test. England won comfortably by an innings and 261 runs

May started with one-day games played on 1 and 2 May. Middlesex established themselves at the top of Division One after winning their first three matches. Yorkshire and Durham were the unbeaten teams in the Second Division. This was followed by the first round of the C&G Trophy, which for the last time included the minor counties and Scotland, Holland, Denmark and Ireland. However, there were no upsets. Durham lost to Derbyshire by 1 wicket, and Leicestershire beat Somerset by 3 wickets in the only all first-class county fixtures.

The fourth round of the Championship saw Gloucestershire sent Glamorgan down for another heavy defeat., as title contenders Hampshire and Nottinghamshire win against Middlesex and Surrey respectively. Surrey were found guilty of ball-tampering in this match, which later led to all their cricketers being fined by Surrey, and to the loss of 8 Championship points. The Second Division saw wins for Durham, Essex, Lancashire and Yorkshire. Whilst these games were being played Loughborough UCCE chalked up the second victory for a UCCE team this season by thrashing Worcestershire by 8 wickets in a game the students dominated in throughout.

On 10 May the Bangladeshis got their tour off with a three-day game against the British Universities, which was drawn. The fifth round of the Championship saw Surrey dish out another defeat to Glamorgan as Middlesex and Sussex won. The Second Division saw Durham maintaining their lead at the top with a 9 wicket win against Lancashire. Worcestershire overcame bottom club Derbyshire, with Yorkshire beating Leicestershire in the only other decided game.

Essex, Lancashire, Hampshire, Worcestershire and Durham all won their totesport games on 15 May, with Leicestershire beating Surrey to continue Surrey's dismal form. The quarter-finals of the C&G Trophy followed, as did a tour match between the Bangladeshi's and Sussex in which the tourists lost by an innings and 226 runs, boding ill for the impending Test series. On 20 May Surrey finally won a totesport League game, beating fellow wooden spoon candidates, Scotland, in Edinburgh by five wickets.

20 May saw the start of another Championship round. Glamorgan lost yet again, this time to Hampshire, and in the other first division tie, Kent beat Nottinghamshire by 196 runs. Division Two saw Worcestershire beat Essex, as first-placed Durham drew with second-placed Yorkshire, and Lancashire drew at Somerset. At the same time, Bangladesh put up a stronger performance in Northampton in a match severely hampered by rain. The last round of the County Championship in May saw Nottinghamshire beat Gloucestershire to finish may top of Division One. Warwickshire beat Hampshire by ten wickets to leave them third and second in the table respectively, as Kent and Surrey drew to keep them in fourth and fifth. The table remains propped up by Glamorgan, who are strong favourites for relegation, with Sussex, Middlesex and Gloucestershire in places six to eight. Durham did not play in this round of the Championship, but remained in first place in Division Two, with Yorkshire missing a chance of taking over as leaders when they drew with Essex. Also in the round Somerset beat Northamptonshire and eighth placed Leicestershire beat ninth- (and bottom-) placed Derbyshire.

The Test match season finally started on 26 May, with Bangladesh completely overwhelmed in just over two days. After being dismissed for 108, Bangladesh could only watch as England made 528 for 3 declared, Marcus Trescothick top-scoring with 194. In their second innings, the tourists could only muster 159 as they went down by a mammoth innings and 261 runs. The one-day league games played over the Spring Bank Holiday weekend left Middlesex top of Division One, with Essex one win behind them with two games in hand. Gloucestershire, Hampshire and Nottinghamshire (who had not won a game by the end of May) were in the relegation spots. As with the County Championship, Durham led the Second Division from Yorkshire, with Derbyshire, Scotland and Leicestershire occupying the bottom three places.

=== June ===
The eighth round of the Championship saw Hampshire beat title rivals Nottinghamshire and Kent beat Gloucestershire, and then lose 8 points for the poor quality of the Maidstone pitch. The other First Division matches were draws, with Glamorgan avoiding defeat after following-on against Sussex. The Second Division saw four draws. Meanwhile, the students of Cambridge UCCE edged past Middlesex by 2 wickets. The Second Test against Bangladesh at Chester-le-Street was another one-sided affair. 5 wickets from Stephen Harmison, on his home ground, helped dismiss the Bangladeshis for 104. Trescothick's 151, Ian Bell's 162* and Graham Thorpe's 66* saw England to 447 for 3 declared. Although Bangladesh did better in their second innings, their 316 saw them lose by an innings and 27 runs.

After another totesport League round, the top division of the Championship continued with Kent thrashing Glamorgan, Warwickshire thrashing Gloucestershire and local rivals Surrey and Middlesex drawing. In the Second Division, Durham pulled away further at the top with another win, this time against Essex, with Worcestershire also scoring a win against Somerset. However, the main focus was on the warm-up games for the NatWest Series and the first ever Twenty20 International between England and Australia. The only surprise in the warm-ups was a welcome win for Bangladesh over Worcestershire, which provided a welcome confidence boost to the Bangladeshis before they took on England and Australia in the NatWest Series.

The Twenty20 International on 13 June saw England score 179 for 8, a total probably 20 above the par score at the Rose Bowl. The Australian innings was a dream for Darren Gough (3 wickets), Jon Lewis (4 wickets) and all Englishmen as the Aussies were reduced to 31 for 7. Ultimately they were dismissed for 79 – first blood to England by 100 runs. Lord's hosted a 50-over match between the next day as part of the World Cricket Tsunami Appeal to raise funds to help countries hit by the Indian Ocean tsunami of 26 December. An MCC team including Shaun Pollock, Sourav Ganguly and Stephen Fleming beat an International XI that included Brian Lara, Rahul Dravid, Shane Warne and Graeme Smith by 112 runs. Then on 15 June came another surprise – Australia were beaten in their final NatWest Series warm-up match by Somerset, or more specifically Graeme Smith and Sanath Jayasuriya, who put on 197 for Somerset's first wicket.

The first NatWest series match saw England easily defeat Bangladesh at the Oval by 10 wickets. The last County Championship round before the mid-season Twenty20 break saw Surrey beat Hampshire, Middlesex beat Glamorgan, Kent beat Warwickshire and Sussex and Nottinghamshire draw to leave Kent top, and Glamorgan bottom of the first division. In the second division, Lancashire beat Derbyshire, who remain bottom; Leicestershire beat second-placed Worcestershire; and leaders Durham drew with Northamptonshire. The last round of the totesport League before the break left Essex and Middlesex at the top of Division One, with Nottinghamshire and Gloucestershire propping them up. Durham held top place in Division Two, with Surrey languishing one place below Scotland at the bottom.

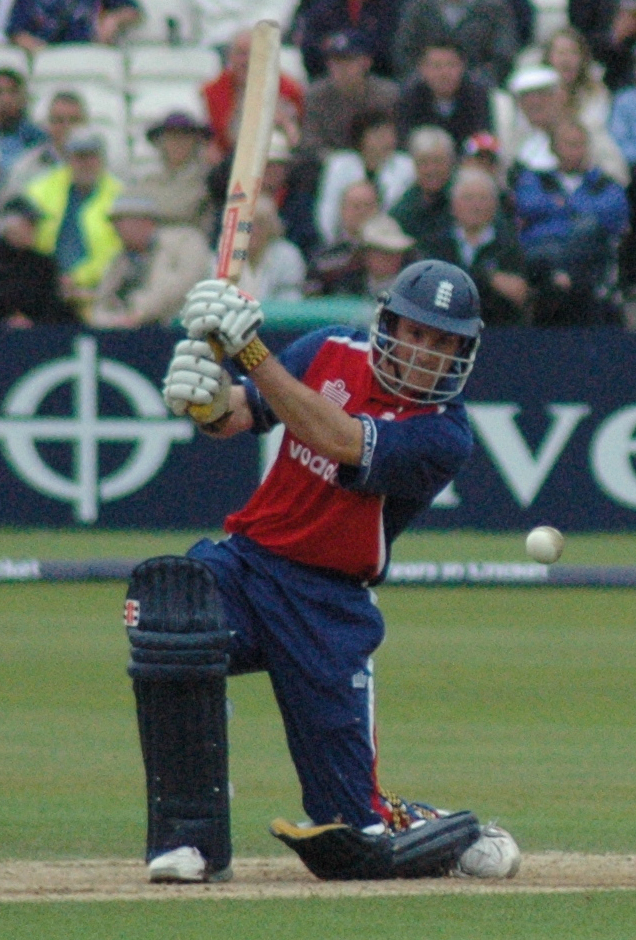
Andrew Strauss batting for England during the NatWest Series

The second NatWest match on 18 June saw what many described as the biggest-ever upset in one-day cricket, and wild celebrations in Dhaka as Bangladesh restricted World Champions Australia to 249 for 5, before Mohammed Ashraful's 100 assisted the Bangladeshis in reaching their target with four balls and five wickets spare. With England scoring a narrow three wicket victory against Australia, the Aussies finished the weekend bottom of the NatWest table, with England well on top. 20 June saw the second tsunami appeal match of the season, this time a Twenty20 affair at the Oval. An Asian XI including Dravid, Muralitharan and Harbhajan Singh scored 157 in an innings finished with a hat-trick from Adam Hollioake. The total was easily surpassed with Greg Blewett's 91 meaning that Stephen Fleming's duck and Brian Lara's 9 could not prevent the International XI winning by 6 wickets with 11 balls left.

The fourth NatWest Series match saw normal service resumed, with England beating Bangladesh by 168 runs after the hosts put on 391 for 4, the second-highest score in ODIs. The 2005 Twenty20 Cup started on 22 June, again with large audiences, and with last year's winners, Leicestershire, and runners-up, Surrey, both scoring wins. The fifth ODI allowed Australia back in, with a comfortable 57 win against England. Any anticipation over the next Australia v Bangladesh tie was easily brushed aside by the Aussies, who struck out Bangladesh for 139, and then reached their target in 19 overs without losing a wicket. Bangladesh were eliminated from the Series in the seventh ODI, when England beat them by five wickets. The eighth match should have been a rehearsal for the final, and Australia's 261 for 9 set the stage well. But rain was always expected and the contest was rained off as a "no result" with England 37 for 1 off 6 overs in their reply. Bangladesh's tour of England ended with a creditable performance against Australia in the ninth ODI, although their 250 for 8 was ultimately overcome by the Aussie with six wickets and eleven balls left after they had wobbled earlier in the innings. At the same time, the Twenty20 Cup was continuing apace, and Oxford University (610 for 5 declared) beat Cambridge University (129 and 268), with Salil Oberoi's 247 gaining positive comment in his native India.

=== July ===
July began with Twenty20 Cup group games, before England tied the final of the NatWest Series after coming back from 33 for 5 to post 196 for 9 – the same as Australia – on 2 July. Two days later, Lancashire became the first team to qualify for the Twenty20 Cup quarter-finals, and the following day Northamptonshire and Surrey joined them.

The final round of the group stage of the Twenty20 Cup was played on 6 July. Middlesex made it through from the South Division despite loss – while Sussex, Middlesex' conquerors, were knocked out. Warwickshire and Somerset qualified from the Midlands/Wales/West Division thanks to wins over Northamptonshire and Gloucestershire respectively, while Derbyshire sneaked through from the North Division after a win over Nottinghamshire, and Leicestershire defeated Yorkshire to join them.

In the NatWest Challenge, a three-ODI series played over five days, England won the first ODI but lost the next two to lose the series 1–2, their only tournament loss in the entire season. In the County Championship, Nottinghamshire enjoyed the lead in Division One for a couple of days after beating Glamorgan by ten wickets – Glamorgan's eighth loss – but Kent, whose match started on 10 July took it back despite losing to Sussex, the six bonus points being enough to take the lead. In Division Two of the Championship, Durham's lead was closed from 21 points to 11 after losing to Lancashire by an innings and 228 runs, the highest margin of victory thus far in the season.

The following day, Surrey got off the last place in Division Two of the totesport League thanks to a three-run victory over Yorkshire, but Surrey were knocked out of the C&G Trophy on 15 July – Hampshire, Lancashire, Warwickshire and Yorkshire reached the semi-finals. Three days later, the quarter-finals of the Twenty20 Cup were held, and Lancashire, Leicestershire, Somerset and Surrey proceeded to the semi-finals at The Oval on 30 July.

In the National League, Essex Eagles beat Lancashire Lightning by eight wickets on 19 July to extend their lead in the first division to eight points with one game in hand. The next round of Championship matches saw Hampshire, Kent, Nottinghamshire and Middlesex record victories to form the top four on 23 July. In Division Two, Northamptonshire and Yorkshire recorded wins, while the top teams Durham and Lancashire drew to remain on top.

However, the eyes of most cricket fans were on Lord's, where England took on Australia. Glenn McGrath worried the English batsmen to end with nine wickets for 82, and Australia recorded their highest team score of the entire series with their second-innings 384 as they completed a 239-run victory on the fourth day of the Test.

England Under-19s began their three-ODI series with Sri Lanka Under-19s on 26 July, with a win, before they travelled to Old Trafford where they played out a no-result and a win to take the series 2–0. In the County Championship, there were four draws in five matches, as rain thwarted play on the first three days of the round from 26 to 29 July. Division Two leaders Durham were the only team to win after beating Somerset at the Riverside.

The month was rounded off with the finals day of the Twenty20 Cup on 30 July, where Lancashire Lightning beat Surrey Lions in the first match, amassing 217 for 4 to win by 20 runs, before Somerset Sabres eked through in the second semi-final after a four-run victory. In the final, however, Graeme Smith hit 64 not out for the Sabres, and Somerset won by four wickets to take their first Twenty20 Cup win.

=== August ===
August began with the Australian tourists completing a draw against Worcestershire in a three-day tour match, while Sussex Sharks kept up their good National League run with a win over Somerset Sabres, their seventh win in succession. Six matches in the Championship started on 3 August, with Kent, Sussex, Warwickshire and Hampshire recording victories. In Division Two, Lancashire used their victory at Grace Road in Leicestershire to exploit a rare slip-up from Durham and grab 16 points in the title-battle, closing the gap to 18 with a game in hand.

However, the Championship matches came in the background due to the second Ashes Test, where England took on Australia at Edgbaston Cricket Ground for the second Test of the five-match series. England carried a 0–1 series deficit into Edgbaston, and after three days of cricket England led by 106 with two Australian wickets left to grab. Shane Warne, Brett Lee (Australia's top-scorer with 43 not out) and Michael Kasprowicz cut 104 of those runs off the target, but Kasprowicz gloved Steve Harmison behind to Geraint Jones, to leave England 2-run winners and the series tied at one-all.

The English youth team were the first English representative team to record a Test victory this summer, however, beating Sri Lanka by 220 runs in an Under-19 Test two days before England seniors defeated Australia. On 6 August, Essex Eagles took control of Division One of the National League after eking out a four-run win over Middlesex Crusaders, and three days later the second Under-19 Test and the first women's Test began – the first ended in an England win, almost as convincing as the first Test, while Arran Brindle scored a maiden Test century to save the draw for England Women. The Ashes battle recommenced on 11 August, and after two English centuries – 166 from Michael Vaughan and a second-innings 106 from Andrew Strauss – Ricky Ponting played a rearguard 156 to save the draw.

There were also matches in the Championship during the Test – rain played a major part, however, and four of seven matches ended in draws, including the top of the table battle in Division One between Kent and Hampshire. Kent gained two bonus points over Hampshire, however, and now led by 17 points. Another National League round on 15 August saw the table-toppers in Division 1, Essex Eagles, fell to 122 and a 60-run loss against Gloucestershire Gladiators, while Sussex Sharks suffered their second successive loss in Division Two. England's youth team also completed their series, whitewashing Sri Lanka with a 173-run win in the final Test.

The following day, five Championship matches began, including a drawn Roses match between Lancashire and Yorkshire, while Sussex went top of Division One after beating Middlesex inside two days. On 18 August, Australia were scheduled to play Scotland in a match that was to be broadcast on BBC – however, the match was rained off, giving the Australians even less time to warm up. Two days later, they began a drawn two-day friendly game with Northamptonshire, on the same day as the C&G Trophy semi-finals. Warwickshire and Hampshire took convincing victories to reach the final. Meanwhile, in the Midlands, Australia's women played two ODIs with England on 19 August and 21 August, winning the first after bowling England out for 128 to go 2–0 up in the series, but losing the second by a two-run margin. There were also a total of ten National League matches from 21 August to 24 August – three were rained off, while the Sharks took a four-point lead in Division Two despite losing their first match with Leicestershire Foxes.

County Championship cricket began again on 24 August, with eight matches played in this period. Four were drawn, but Division One table-toppers Sussex fell to a 101-run defeat against Warwickshire as their Pakistani overseas player Rana Naved-ul-Hasan went wicketless in the first innings. Lancashire also recorded a win to go second in Division Two, six points off leaders Durham with a game in hand.

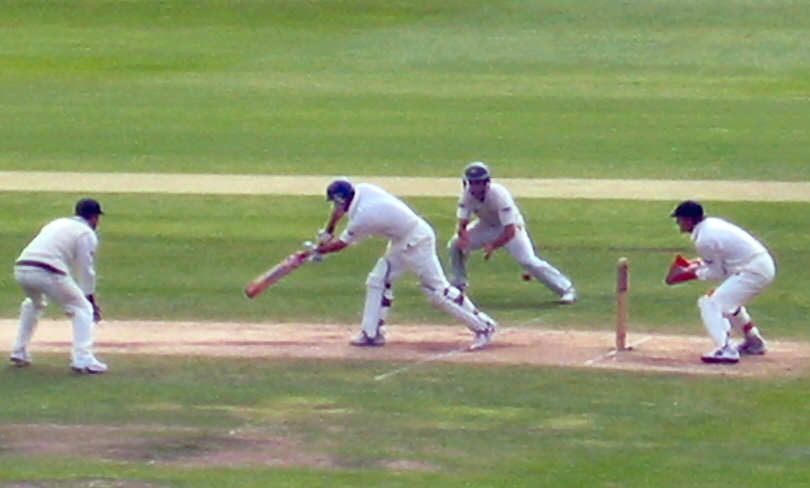
Andrew Strauss plays forward to Shane Warne in the fourth Ashes Test.

On the international stage, England and Australia began their battle for the Ashes once again on 25 August, where England chased 129 to win with seven wickets down after earning a 259-run lead on first innings and becoming the first team to ask Australia to follow on in 17 years. The men's win got much more media coverage than the women's first Ashes victory since 1963, achieved through a six-wicket victory in the second and final Test inspired by the all-round efforts of Katherine Brunt (who took nine wickets and made 52 runs in her only innings).

More National League games followed, with Essex Eagles securing the title thanks to a 12-run win over C&G Trophy finalists Hampshire Hawks, while Sussex Sharks ended the month with wins over Scottish Saltires and Surrey Lions to take a ten-point lead in Division Two, though with second-placed Durham Dynamos having two games in hand. The County Championship also moved towards its conclusion, with Nottinghamshire and Hampshire recording wins on the matches that started on 30 August to take the top two spots in the Division One table. In Division Two, Derbyshire came close to breaking their winless streak when they finished three runs short of a winning total against Durham, and had to settle for a draw; runners-up Lancashire lost further ground in the title battle through a 285-run defeat at the hands of Northamptonshire.

=== September ===
September began with Australia's women recording a four-run win in the final ODI of the five-match series – Clare Connor out as last woman when England needed five to win off the last over. Karen Rolton then hit 96 not out in the second women's Twenty20 international ever to be played, as Australia won by seven wickets. On 3 September, Hampshire batted first to make 290 in the C&G Trophy final, and Andy Bichel, Shane Watson and Chris Tremlett combined to bowl their final opponents Warwickshire out for 272 to win the Trophy, becoming the third club to win a major trophy in England this season. Meanwhile, former England Under-19 player Alastair Cook took the Australian bowlers on for 270 in a drawn non-first class tour match.

There were National League games from 4 September to 6 September, and Sussex Sharks became the first team to promote from Division Two, despite not even playing. In the Championship, Nottinghamshire began their match two days early, and completed an innings defeat inside two days to take a 23.5-point lead over second-placed Hampshire. Hampshire had a bye, however, so Sussex took the opportunity to go second with a two-day victory over Glamorgan. Nottinghamshire had a game in hand and 10 points on Sussex, however, and their only challenge looked to come from Kent, who drew their match with Middlesex to be third in the table, trailing by 19.5 points with the same number of games as Nottinghamshire.

The final Test match of the season started on 8 September with England needing a draw or better to win back the Ashes after 16 years of Australian domination. England opener Andrew Strauss made a first-innings century, which was matched by his Australian counterpart Matthew Hayden, who ground out his hundred from 218 balls and went on to top score with 138. However, Andrew Flintoff and Matthew Hoggard grabbed the last nine wickets for 103 runs as Australia were bowled out six overs into the fourth day afternoon. Going into the second innings with a 4-run lead, England fell to 199 for 7, but Ashley Giles held out for his fourth Test half-century and a 109-run stand with Kevin Pietersen – who made the series' second-highest score with 158 to give England a total of 335. Australia walked off after three minutes in their second innings, to give England the draw and the 2–1 series victory.

Meanwhile, in the County Championship, Lancashire assumed the ascendancy of Division Two with an eight-wicket win over Essex which also secured their return to Division One after only one season on the lowest rung of the Championship ladder. National League losses for Worcestershire Royals and Hampshire Hawks then left four teams on 22 points in the bottom of Division One – three of them would have to go down.

Nottinghamshire and Kent then faced off for the match that would decide the County Championship title, with Kent trailing by 19.5 points before the match at Trent Bridge. Kent failed to chase 420 in five hours, and Nottinghamshire recorded a 214-run win to take the Championship title. Durham and Yorkshire also secured Championship promotion with draws, while the first International 20:20 Club Championship was won by Faisalabad Wolves after a five-wicket win over Chilaw Marians in the final.

In the National League, Warwickshire Bears won three matches in seven days to go third in the Division Two table before the final round, with Derbyshire Phantoms the only team that had a theoretical possibility of catching the Bears. Lancashire Lightning and Worcestershire Royals both lost in Division One, leaving them tied on points with two other teams at the bottom of the table. The final round of the Championship saw Hampshire beat the newly crowned county champions Nottinghamshire by an innings and 188 runs, their second win over Nottinghamshire in the Championship this year, but they still finished 2.5 points behind. Surrey were relegated after conceding too many bonus points to Middlesex, and a total of four innings victories were registered on the final matchday.

The season ended with nine National League matches – Lancashire Lightning survived in Division One after beating Worcestershire Royals, while Gloucestershire Gladiators were relegated despite a win. Warwickshire Bears confirmed promotion, despite losing to Durham Dynamos, while Scottish Saltires played their last National League game, losing by eight wickets.
