= List of Bangladesh national cricket captains =

Captains of Bangladesh cricket teams

Bangladesh became a full member of the International Cricket Council (ICC) on 26 June 2000, and played its first Test match against India later that year. Before then, it had been an associate member of the ICC since 1977, competing in six ICC Trophies, the leading One Day International (ODI) competition for non-Test playing nations. The country has enjoyed some success in ODI's and Twenty20 Internationals (T20I) since its promotion, but has struggled to perform in the Test match arena. Recent years have seen the nation improve tremendously however, and it is beginning to establish itself as a powerful force in the cricketing world.

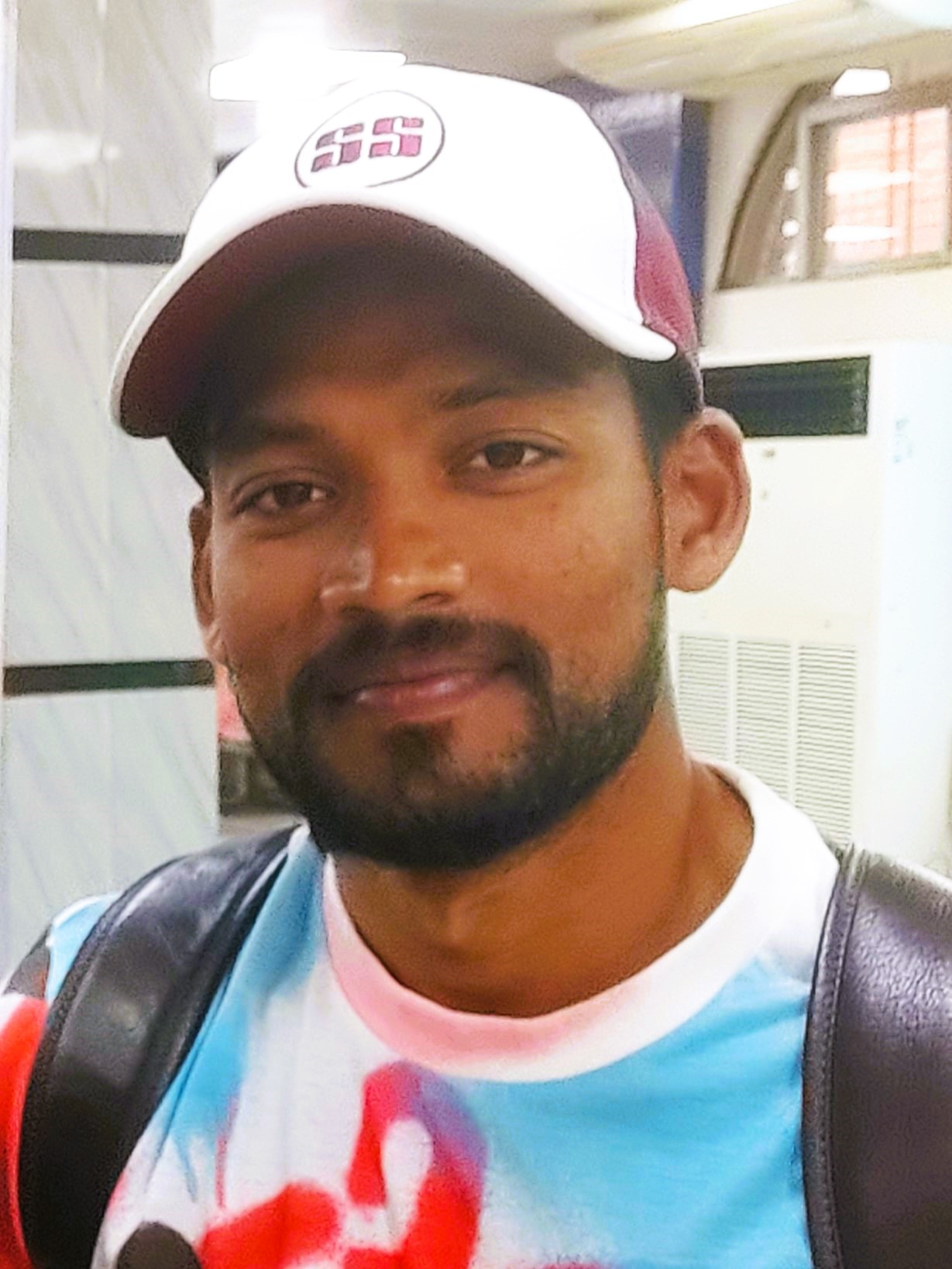
Najmul Hossain Shanto is the current captain of Bangladesh in Test and ODI formats.

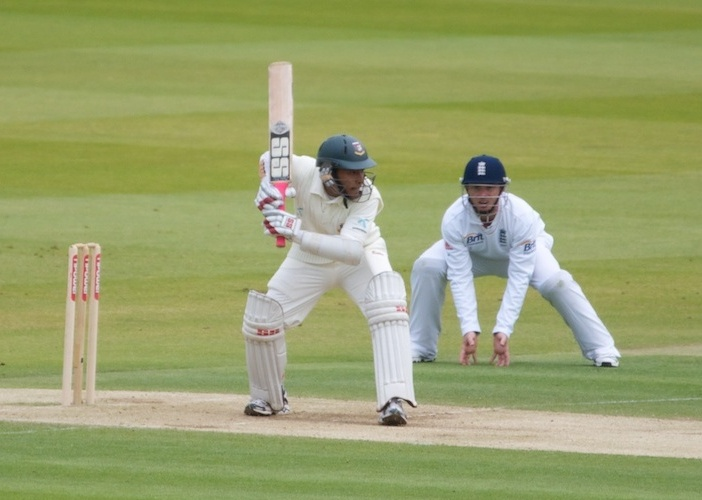
Wicketkeeper batsman Mushfiqur Rahim is Bangladesh's most successful Test captain, having won 7 test matches under his captaincy

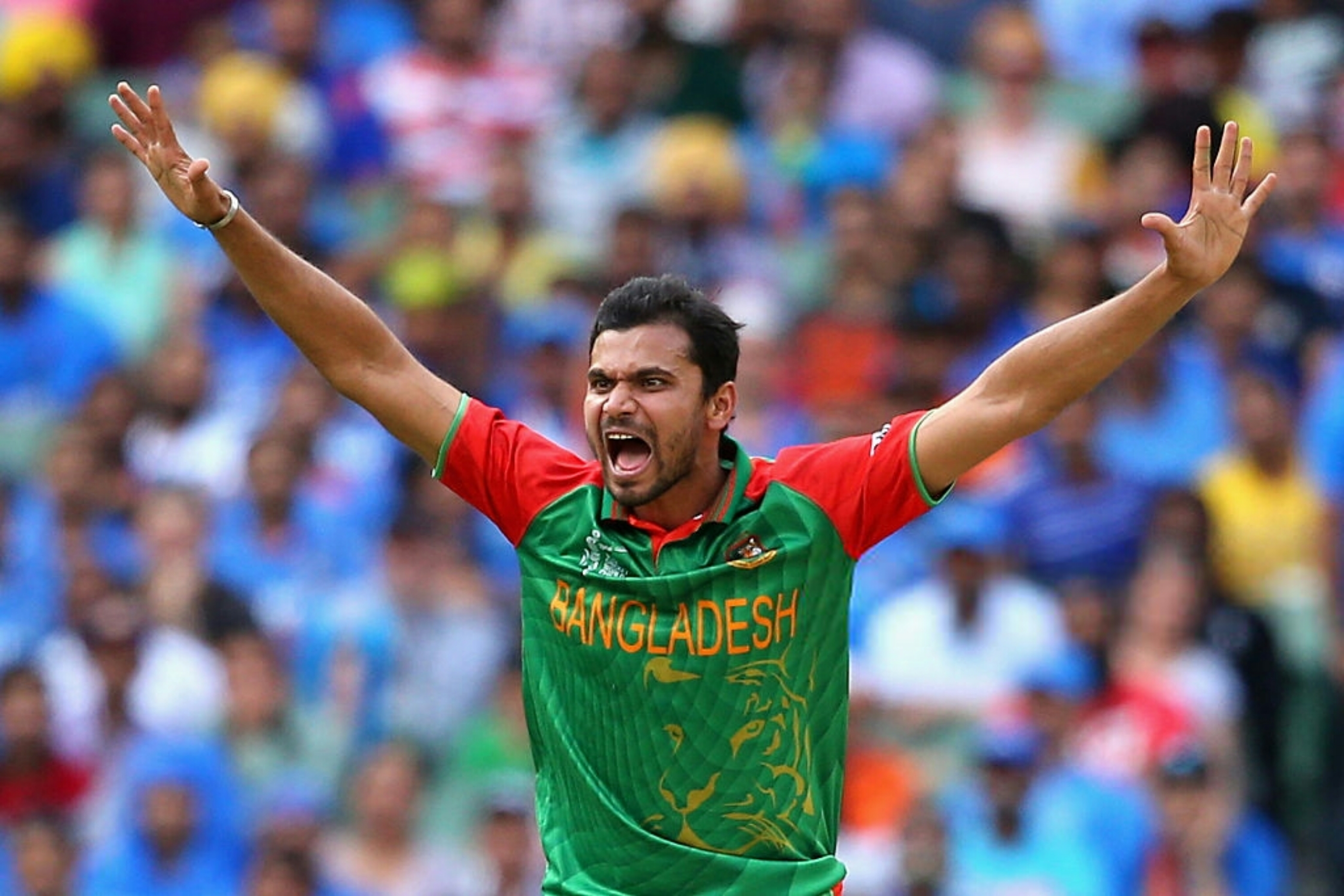
Mashrafe Mortaza is the most successful Bangladeshi ODI captain. He is the only Bangladeshi ODI captain to win 50 ODIs)

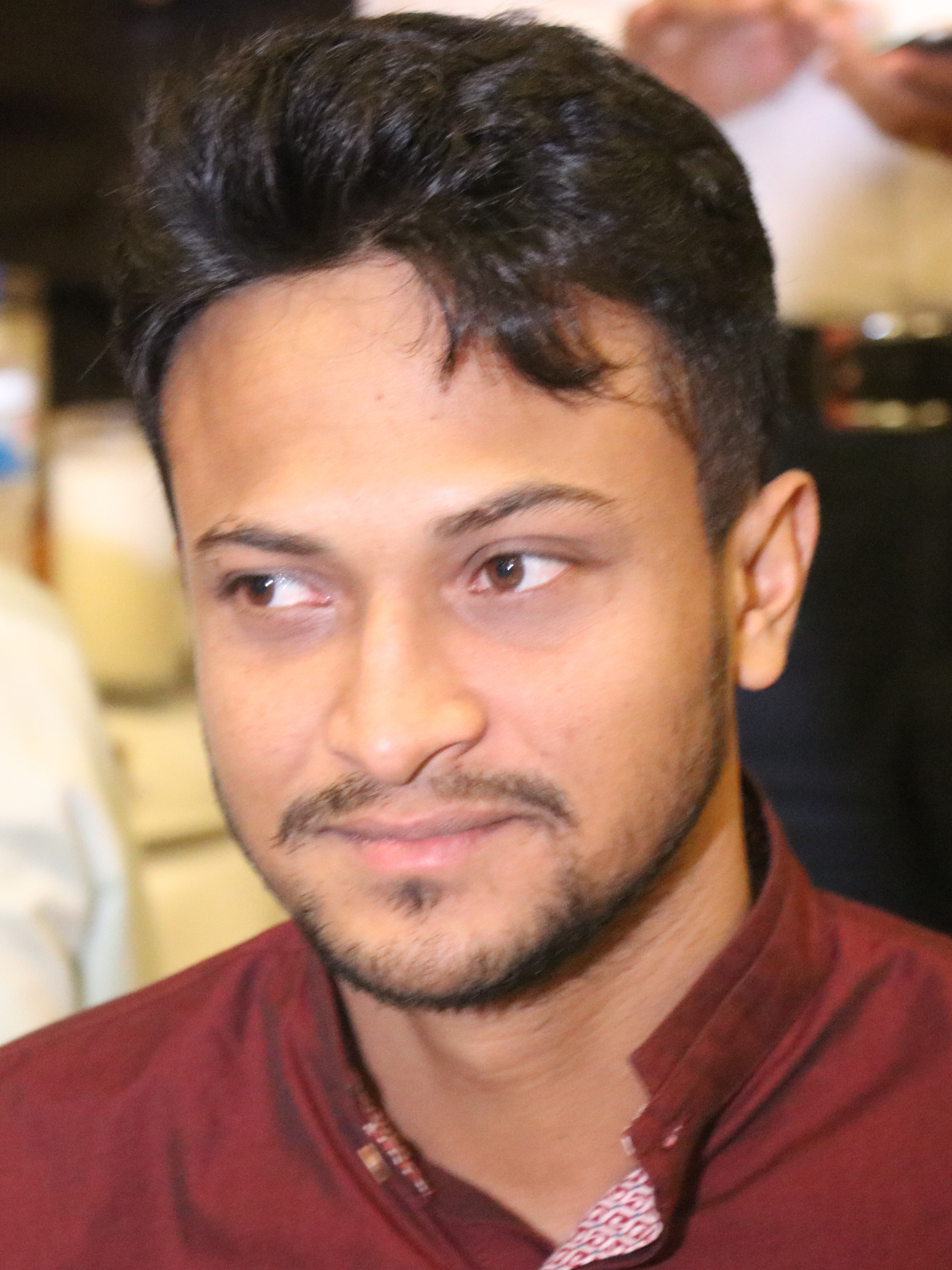
Shakib Al Hasan is the most successful captain for Bangladesh in T20I, captaining since 2009. He is also one of the most successful captain for Bangladesh in Test and ODI. The most dominating and aggressive captain ever in history of Bangladesh cricket in all-formats.

== Men's cricket ==
=== Test captains ===
This is a list of cricketers who have captained the Bangladesh national cricket team for at least one Test match.

Bangladeshi Test captains
No.	Name	Year	Opposition	Location	Played	Won	Lost	Drawn
1	Naimur Rahman	2000–01	India	Bangladesh	1	0	1	0
1	Naimur Rahman	2000–01	Zimbabwe	Zimbabwe	2	0	2	0
1	Naimur Rahman	2001–02	Pakistan	Pakistan	1	0	1	0
1	Naimur Rahman	2001–02	Sri Lanka	Sri Lanka	1	0	1	0
1	Naimur Rahman	2001–02	Zimbabwe	Bangladesh	2	0	1	1
1	Naimur Rahman	Total			7	0	6	1
2	Khaled Mashud	2001–02	New Zealand	New Zealand	2	0	2	0
2	Khaled Mashud	2001–02	Pakistan	Bangladesh	2	0	2	0
2	Khaled Mashud	2002	Sri Lanka	Sri Lanka	2	0	2	0
2	Khaled Mashud	2002–03	South Africa	South Africa	2	0	2	0
2	Khaled Mashud	2002–03	West Indies	Bangladesh	2	0	2	0
2	Khaled Mashud	2004–05	New Zealand	Bangladesh	2	0	2	0
2	Khaled Mashud	Total			12	0	12	0
3	Khaled Mahmud	2003	South Africa	Bangladesh	2	0	2	0
3	Khaled Mahmud	2003	Australia	Australia	2	0	2	0
3	Khaled Mahmud	2003	Pakistan	Pakistan	3	0	3	0
3	Khaled Mahmud	2003–04	England	Bangladesh	2	0	2	0
3	Khaled Mahmud	Total			9	0	9	0
4	Habibul Bashar	2003–04	Zimbabwe	Zimbabwe	2	0	1	1
4	Habibul Bashar	2004	West Indies	West Indies	2	0	1	1
4	Habibul Bashar	2004–05	India	Bangladesh	2	0	2	0
4	Habibul Bashar	2004–05	Zimbabwe	Bangladesh	2	1	0	1
4	Habibul Bashar	2005	England	England	2	0	2	0
4	Habibul Bashar	2005–06	Sri Lanka	Sri Lanka	2	0	2	0
4	Habibul Bashar	2005–06	Sri Lanka	Bangladesh	2	0	2	0
4	Habibul Bashar	2005–06	Australia	Bangladesh	2	0	2	0
4	Habibul Bashar	2007	India	Bangladesh	2	0	1	1
4	Habibul Bashar	Total			18	1	13	4
5	Mohammad Ashraful	2007	Sri Lanka	Sri Lanka	3	0	3	0
5	Mohammad Ashraful	2007–08	New Zealand	New Zealand	2	0	2	0
5	Mohammad Ashraful	2007–08	South Africa	Bangladesh	2	0	2	0
5	Mohammad Ashraful	2008–09	New Zealand	Bangladesh	2	0	1	1
5	Mohammad Ashraful	2008–09	South Africa	South Africa	2	0	2	0
5	Mohammad Ashraful	2008–09	Sri Lanka	Bangladesh	2	0	2	0
5	Mohammad Ashraful	Total			13	0	12	1
6	Mashrafe Mortaza	2009	West Indies	(Cricket West Indies) West Indies	1	1	0	0
6	Mashrafe Mortaza	Total			1	1	0	0
7	Shakib Al Hasan	2009	West Indies	(Cricket West Indies) West Indies	1	1	0	0
7	Shakib Al Hasan	2009–10	New Zealand	New Zealand	1	0	1	0
7	Shakib Al Hasan	2009–10	India	Bangladesh	2	0	2	0
7	Shakib Al Hasan	2009–10	England	Bangladesh	2	0	2	0
7	Shakib Al Hasan	2010	England	England	2	0	2	0
7	Shakib Al Hasan	2011	Zimbabwe	Zimbabwe	1	0	1	0
7	Shakib Al Hasan	2018	West Indies	(Cricket West Indies) West indies	2	0	2	0
7	Shakib Al Hasan	2018–19	West Indies	Bangladesh	2	2	0	0
7	Shakib Al Hasan	2019–20	Afghanistan	Bangladesh	1	0	1	0
7	Shakib Al Hasan	2022	West Indies	(Cricket West Indies) West Indies	2	0	2	0
7	Shakib Al Hasan	2022–23	India	Bangladesh	2	0	2	0
7	Shakib Al Hasan	2022–23	Ireland	Bangladesh	1	1	0	0
7	Shakib Al Hasan	Total			19	4	15	0
8	Mushfiqur Rahim	2011–12	West Indies	Bangladesh	2	0	1	1
8	Mushfiqur Rahim	2011–12	Pakistan	Bangladesh	2	0	2	0
8	Mushfiqur Rahim	2012–13	West Indies	Bangladesh	2	0	2	0
8	Mushfiqur Rahim	2012–13	Sri Lanka	Sri Lanka	2	0	1	1
8	Mushfiqur Rahim	2013	Zimbabwe	Zimbabwe	2	1	1	0
8	Mushfiqur Rahim	2013–14	New Zealand	Bangladesh	2	0	0	2
8	Mushfiqur Rahim	2013–14	Sri Lanka	Bangladesh	2	0	1	1
8	Mushfiqur Rahim	2014	West Indies	(Cricket West Indies) West Indies	2	0	2	0
8	Mushfiqur Rahim	2014–15	Zimbabwe	Bangladesh	3	3	0	0
8	Mushfiqur Rahim	2014–15	Pakistan	Bangladesh	2	0	1	1
8	Mushfiqur Rahim	2015	India	Bangladesh	1	0	0	1
8	Mushfiqur Rahim	2015	South Africa	Bangladesh	2	0	0	2
8	Mushfiqur Rahim	2016–17	England	Bangladesh	2	1	1	0
8	Mushfiqur Rahim	2016–17	New Zealand	New Zealand	1	0	1	0
8	Mushfiqur Rahim	2016–17	India	India	1	0	1	0
8	Mushfiqur Rahim	2016–17	Sri Lanka	Sri Lanka	2	1	1	0
8	Mushfiqur Rahim	2017	Australia	Bangladesh	2	1	1	0
8	Mushfiqur Rahim	2017–18	South Africa	South Africa	2	0	2	0
8	Mushfiqur Rahim	Total			34	7	18	9
9	Tamim Iqbal	2016–17	New Zealand	New Zealand	1	0	1	0
9	Tamim Iqbal	Total			1	0	1	0
10	Mahmudullah	2017–18	Sri Lanka	Bangladesh	2	0	1	1
10	Mahmudullah	2018–19	Zimbabwe	Bangladesh	2	1	1	0
10	Mahmudullah	2018–19	New Zealand	New Zealand	2	0	2	0
10	Mahmudullah	Total			6	1	4	1
11	Mominul Haque	2019–20	India	India	2	0	2	0
11	Mominul Haque	2019–20	Pakistan	Pakistan	1	0	1	0
11	Mominul Haque	2019–20	Zimbabwe	Bangladesh	1	1	0	0
11	Mominul Haque	2020–21	West Indies	Bangladesh	2	0	2	0
11	Mominul Haque	2020–21	Sri Lanka	Sri Lanka	2	0	1	1
11	Mominul Haque	2021	Zimbabwe	Zimbabwe	1	1	0	0
11	Mominul Haque	2021–22	Pakistan	Bangladesh	2	0	2	0
11	Mominul Haque	2021–22	New Zealand	New Zealand	2	1	1	0
11	Mominul Haque	2021–22	South Africa	South Africa	2	0	2	0
11	Mominul Haque	2022	Sri Lanka	Bangladesh	2	0	1	1
11	Mominul Haque	Total			17	3	12	2
12	Litton Das	2023	Afghanistan	Bangladesh	1	1	0	0
12	Litton Das	Total			1	1	0	0
13	Najmul Shanto	2023–24	New Zealand	Bangladesh	2	1	1	0
13	Najmul Shanto	2023–24	Sri Lanka	Bangladesh	2	0	2	0
13	Najmul Shanto	2024	Pakistan	Pakistan	2	2	0	0
13	Najmul Shanto	2024–25	India	India	2	0	2	0
13	Najmul Shanto	2024–25	South Africa	Bangladesh	2	0	2	0
13	Najmul Shanto	2025	Zimbabwe	Bangladesh	2	1	1	0
13	Najmul Shanto	2025	Sri Lanka	Sri Lanka	2	0	1	1
13	Najmul Shanto	2025–26	Ireland	Bangladesh	2	2	0	0
13	Najmul Shanto	2025–26	Pakistan	Bangladesh	2	2	0	0
13	Najmul Shanto	2026	Zimbabwe	Zimbabwe	1	0	1	0
13	Najmul Shanto	2026	Australia	Australia	2	1	1	0
13	Najmul Shanto	Total			21	9	11	1
14	Mehidy Miraz	2024–25	West Indies	West Indies	2	1	1	0
14	Mehidy Miraz	Total			2	1	1	0

Test Match record
Total	Played	Won	Lost	Drawn	Tie/NR
Test matches	161	28	114	19	0
Last updated 23 August 2026

=== One-Day International captains ===
This is a list of cricketers who have captained the Bangladesh national team for at least one One Day International.

Bangladeshi ODI captains
No.	Name	Year	Played	Won	Tied	Lost	NR
1	Gazi Ashraf	1986–1990	7	0	0	7	0
2	Minhajul Abedin	1990	2	0	0	2	0
3	Akram Khan	1995–1998	15	1	0	14	0
4	Aminul Islam	1998–2000	16	2	0	14	0
5	Naimur Rahman	2000–2001	4	0	0	4	0
6	Khaled Mashud	2001–2006	30	4	0	24	2
7	Khaled Mahmud	2003	15	0	0	15	0
8	Habibul Bashar	2004–2007	69	29	0	40	0
9	Rajin Saleh	2004	2	0	0	2	0
10	Mohammad Ashraful	2007–2009	38	8	0	30	0
11	Shakib Al Hasan	2009–2023	62	27	0	34	1
12	Mashrafe Mortaza	2010/2014–2020	88	50	0	36	2
13	Mushfiqur Rahim	2011–2014	37	11	0	24	2
14	Tamim Iqbal	2019–2023	37	21	0	13	2
15	Litton Das	2022–2023	7	3	0	3	1
16	Najmul Shanto	2023–2025	13	4	0	9	0
17	Mehidy Miraz	2024–Present	19	7	1	11	0
Total			461	167	1	283	10

- Last updated: 23 April 2026 Bangladesh vs New Zealand

=== Twenty20 International captains ===
This is a list of cricketers who have captained the Bangladesh national team in at least one Twenty20 International.

Bangladeshi T20I captains
No.	Name	Year	Played	Won	Lost	Tied	NR
1	Shahriar Nafees	2006	1	1	0	0	0
2	Mohammad Ashraful	2007–2009	11	2	9	0	0
3	Shakib Al Hasan	2009–2023	39	16	23	0	0
4	Mushfiqur Rahim	2011–2014	23	8	14	0	1
5	Mashrafe Mortaza	2014-2017	28	10	17	0	1
6	Mahmudullah	2018–2022	43	16	26	0	1
7	Litton Das	2021–present	31	16	14	0	1
8	Nurul Sohan	2022–2022	5	3	2	0	0
9	Mosaddek Hossain	2022	1	0	1	0	0
10	Saif Hassan	2023	3	2	1	0	0
11	Najmul Shanto	2023–2024	24	10	13	0	1
12	Jaker Ali	2025	5	3	2	0	0
Total			214	87	122	0	5

- Last Updated: 2 May 2026 (as of Bangladesh Vs New Zealand)

== Women's cricket ==
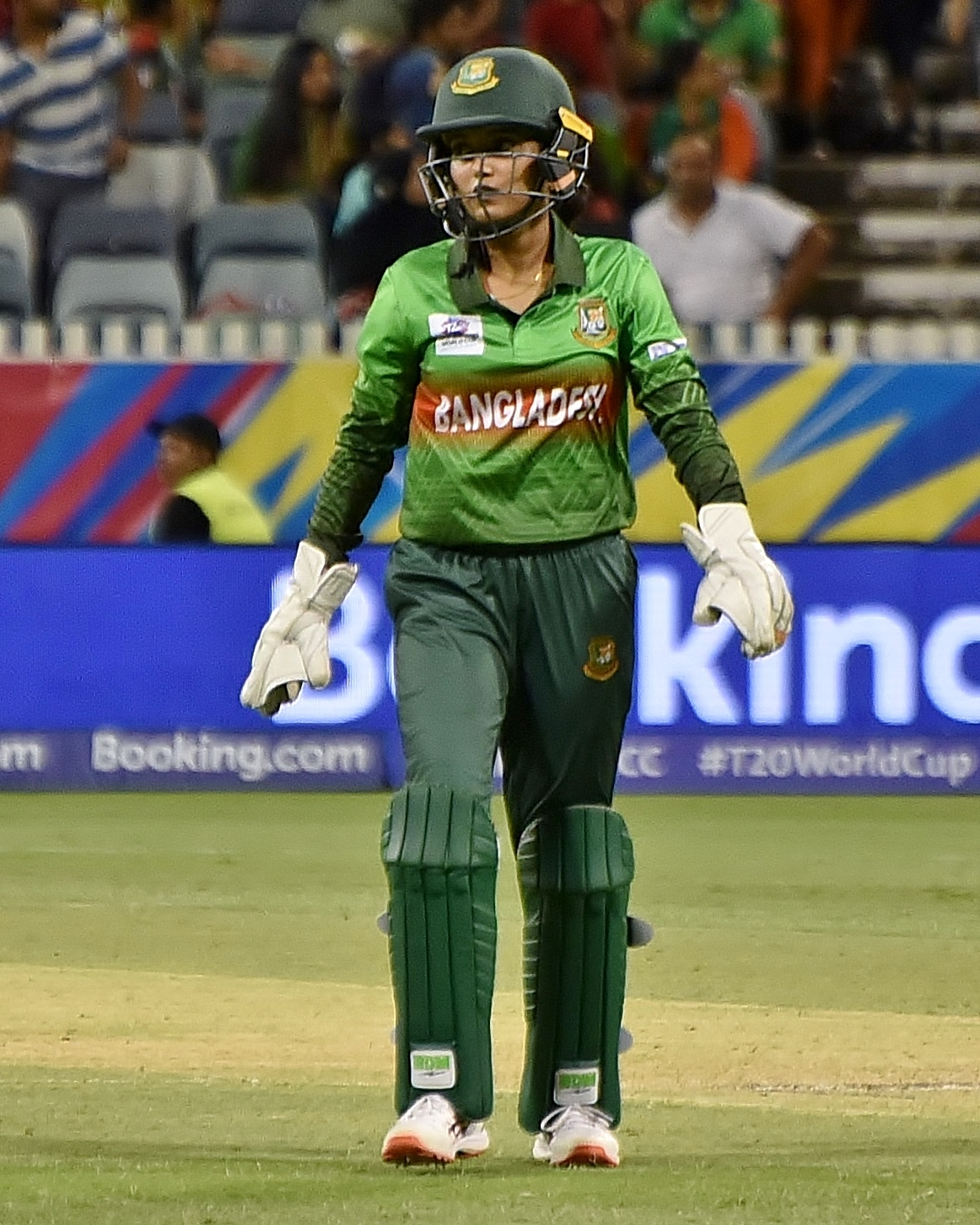
Nigar Sultana is the current captain of Bangladesh in all formats.

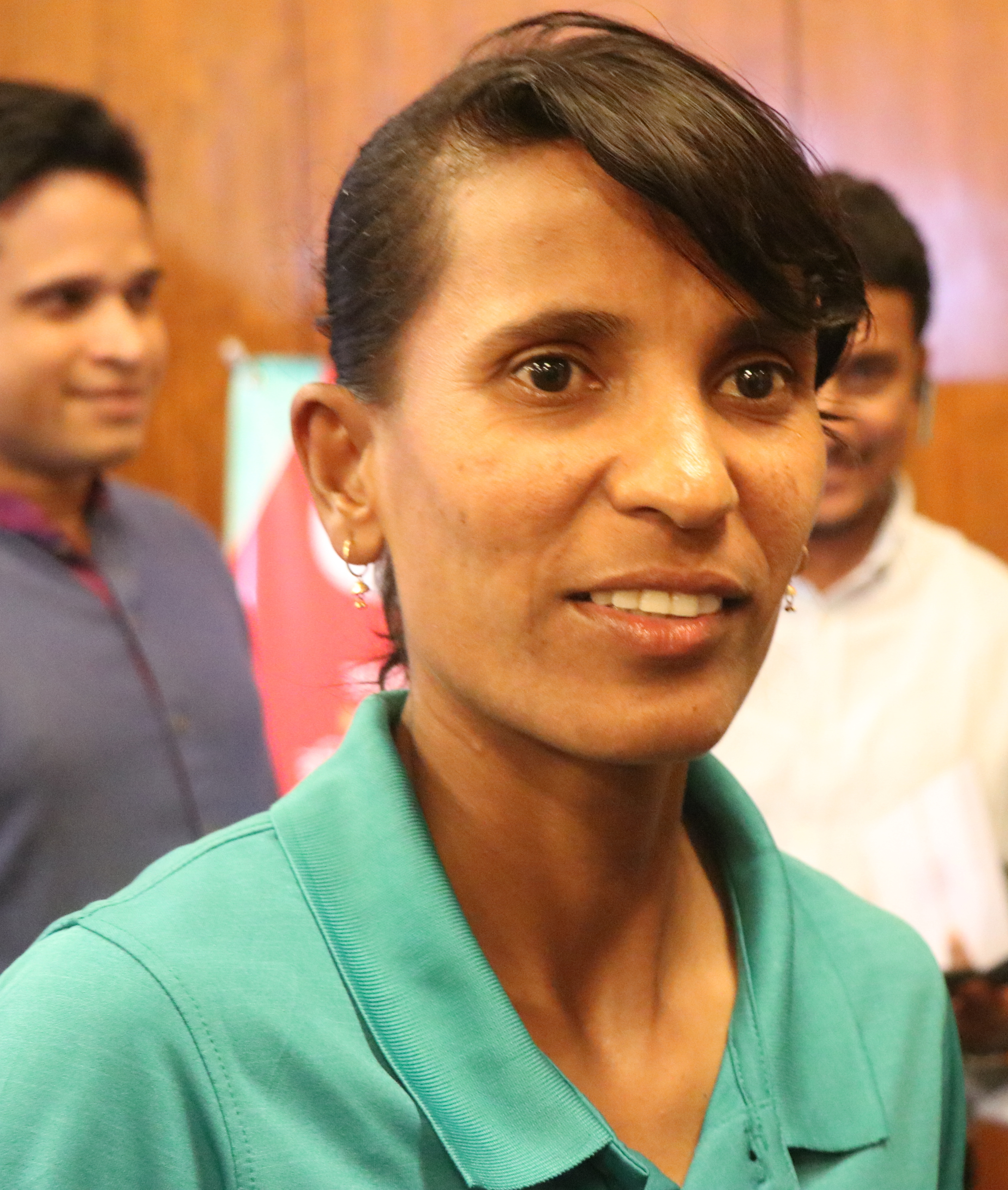
Salma Khatun is the most successful captain for Bangladesh in all formats.

=== Women's ODI captains ===
This is a list of cricketers who have captained the Bangladesh women's cricket team for at least one Women's One Day International.

Bangladesh Women ODI captains
SL. No.	Name	Year	Played	Won	Lost	Tied	NR	Win %
1	Salma Khatun	2011–2015	18	4	13	0	1	23.52
2	Jahanara Alam	2016	2	1	0	0	1	100.00
3	Rumana Ahmed	2017–2021	16	3	13	0	0	18.75
4	Fahima Khatun	2021	2	2	0	0	0	100
5	Nigar Sultana	2021–present	50	15	29	4	4	34.78
Total			90	26	56	2	6	45.69

- Last updated October 14, 2026.

=== Women's T20I captains ===
This is a list of cricketers who have captained the Bangladesh women's cricket team for at least one Women's Twenty20 International.

Bangladesh Women T20 captains
Sl. No.	Name	Year	Played	Won	Lost	Tied	NR	Win %
1	Salma Khatun	2012–2020	65	27	38	0	0	41.53
2	Jahanara Alam	2014–2016	7	0	7	0	0	0.00
3	Rumana Ahmed	2016	3	0	3	0	0	0.00
4	Nigar Sultana	2022–present	4	3	1	0	0	75.00
Total			79	30	49	0	0	37.97

- Last updated 31 July 2022.

== Youth cricket ==
=== Under-19s Test captains ===
This is a list of cricketers who have captained the Bangladeshi Under-19 cricket team for at least one Under-19 Test match.

Bangladeshi Under-19 Test captains
No	Name	Year	Played	Won	Lost	D/T	Win %
1	Enamul Haque Jr	2004	2	0	2	0	0.00
2	Shahriar Nafees	2004	1	0	0	1	0.00
3	Mahmudul Hasan	2007–09	7	1	2	4	0.00
4	Suhrawadi Shuvo	2004	2	0	0	2	0.00
5	Mosaddek Hossain	2013	2	0	0	2	0.00
6	Mehedi Miraz	2015	2	0	0	2	0.00
7	Towhid Hridoy	2018	2	1	1	0	50.00
8	Akbar Ali	2019	2	2	0	0	100.00
9	Amite Hasan	2019	2	0	0	2	0.00
10	Aich Mollah	2021	1	0	1	0	0.00
11	Ahrar Amin	2022	1	0	0	1	0.00
12	Sharear Sakib	2023	1	0	1	0	0.00
Total			25	5	7	13	

- Last updated: 31 December 2023

=== Under-19s ODI captains ===
This is a list of cricketers who have captained the Bangladesh Under-19 cricket team for at least one Under-19 One Day International. The table of results is complete to the Super Six stage match against Pakistan in 2024 Under-19 Cricket World Cup. Bangladesh's greatest success in the Under-19 World Cup has been winning the title in 2020 beating India in the final. Bangladesh also won the plate, the competition for teams failing to progress past the first qualifying round of the Under-19 World Cup. They achieved this in both 1997/8 and 2003/4, and during the latter tournament, beating Australia in doing so.

Bangladeshi Under-19 ODI captains
Number	Name	Year	Played	Won	Tied	Lost	NR
1	Shabbir Khan	1997/8	7	6	0	1	0
2	Hannan Sarkar	1999/2000	7	5	0	2	0
3	Nafees Iqbal	2001–02/2003–04	10	3	1	6	0
4	Ashiqur Rahman	2003/04	8	6	0	2	0
5	Shahriar Nafees	2004	1	0	0	1	0
6	Mushfiqur Rahim	2005–06	18	14	0	4	0
7	Mahmudul Hasan	2007	35	22	0	11	2
8	Suhrawadi Shuvo	2007–08	22	12	0	9	1
10	Anamul Haque	2012	7	4	0	3	0
11	Al-Amin	2012	1	0	0	1	0
12	Mosaddek Hossain	2012	5	2	0	3	0
14	Asif Ahmed	2013	6	4	0	2	0
15	Mehedi Miraz	2013/16	48	30	0	17	1
16	Mehedi Rana	2013	1	1	0	0	0
17	Nazmul Shanto	2015	7	6	0	1	0
18	Saif Hassan	2016–2018	15	5	0	9	1
19	Towhid Hridoy	2018	8	2	0	4	2
20	Akbar Ali	2019–2020	28	21	1	4	2
21	SM Meherob	2021	10	3	0	7	0
22	Rakibul Hasan	2021–present	8	2	0	5	1
Grand total			282	164	2	106	10

- Last updated 12 February 2024

== See also ==
- List of Bangladeshi Test cricketers
- List of Bangladeshi ODI cricketers
