= Bangladeshi cricket team in New Zealand in 2007–08 =

Bangladesh cricket team in New Zealand in 2007–08
	Bangladesh	New Zealand
- Dates: 19 December 2007 – 16 January 2008
Captains	Mohammad Ashraful	Daniel Vettori

Test series
- Result: New Zealand won the 2-match series 2–0
Most runs	Tamim Iqbal (152)	Matthew Bell (128)
Most wickets	Mashrafe Mortaza (7)	Chris Martin (13)

One Day International series
- Results: New Zealand won the 3-match series 3–0
Most runs	Tamim Iqbal (106)	Jamie How (169)
Most wickets	Shakib Al Hasan (3)	Kyle Mills (9)

The Bangladesh cricket team toured New Zealand between 19 December 2007 and 16 January 2008 to play three one day internationals (ODIs) and two Test matches. This was the second Bangladeshi tour to New Zealand (the first being their 2001–02 tour) and the third series between the two countries following New Zealand's 2004–05 tour to Bangladesh. The teams also met in the pool stage of the 2003 Cricket World Cup and at the Super 8 stage of the 2007 Cricket World Cup.

New Zealand whitewashed Bangladesh in both the ODI and Test series, leaving them still searching for their first win against New Zealand in an official match. They did beat New Zealand in a warm-up match for the 2007 World Cup; however this was not recognised as an official match. Similarly, Bangladesh beat a New Zealand XI on this tour but, as this was not an official New Zealand team, it did not count as an official match either.

== New Zealand cricket team ==
At the start of the series, New Zealand were ranked third in the ICC ODI Championship and seventh in the ICC Test Championship. Prior to this series, the New Zealand team had toured South Africa, losing the test series 2–0 and the ODI series 2–1; and Australia, where they lost the Chappell-Hadlee Trophy series 2–0.

== Bangladesh cricket team ==
Bangladesh were ranked ninth in the ODI championship and ninth in the test championship. Their previous outing was in the 2007 ICC World Twenty20 championships where they reached the Super 8 stage. Their most recent series was their 2007 tour to Sri Lanka where they lost both the Test and ODI series 3–0.

== Squads ==
Following New Zealand's losses in South Africa and Australia, three players from the touring squad – Lou Vincent, Michael Mason and Gareth Hopkins – were released to return to their provincial teams in order to give them playing time in the State Shield. Peter Fulton, who had missed the two tours due to having knee surgery, was included in the squad after showing good form in the four-day State Championship competition. Mason was called back into the squad for the third ODI as cover for Mark Gillespie who injured his left shoulder bowling in the second match.

Bangladesh named opener Junaid Siddique, uncapped at One Day International level, in their squad while recalling fast bowler Nazmul Hossain after impressive domestic performances. Injuries to Tushar Imran and Syed Rasel resulted in Rajin Saleh and Sajidul Islam being added to the squad prior to the series.

New Zealand recalled opening batsman Matthew Bell to the Test squad, dropping Michael Papps, Scott Styris, and Ross Taylor from the squad that had travelled to South Africa. Peter Fulton was also recalled with Jeetan Patel set to join the squad for the second Test, and Mark Gillespie ready to take his place if he were to recover from a shoulder injury.

Bangladesh called up Habibul Bashar, Shahriar Nafees, and Enamul Haque junior, while Javed Omar, Tushar Imran, Nazmul Hossain, and Mehrab Hossain junior returned home.

ODI squads		Test squads
New Zealand	Bangladesh	New Zealand	Bangladesh
Daniel Vettori (c)	Mohammad Ashraful (c)	Daniel Vettori (c)	Mohammad Ashraful (c)
Brendon McCullum (wk)	Mushfiqur Rahim (wk)	Brendon McCullum (wk)	Mushfiqur Rahim (wk)
Jamie How	Mashrafe Mortaza	Matthew Bell	Mashrafe Mortaza
Peter Fulton	Javed Omar	Peter Fulton	Abdur Razzak
Scott Styris	Tushar Imran	Craig Cumming	Shakib Al Hasan
Ross Taylor	Abdur Razzak	Iain O'Brien	Syed Rasel
Mathew Sinclair	Shakib Al Hasan	Mathew Sinclair	Aftab Ahmed
Jacob Oram	Syed Rasel	Jacob Oram	Shahadat Hossain
Kyle Mills	Aftab Ahmed	Kyle Mills	Junaid Siddique
Mark Gillespie	Shahadat Hossain	Michael Mason	Farhad Reza
Chris Martin	Junaid Siddique	Chris Martin	Tamim Iqbal
Jeetan Patel	Farhad Reza	Jeetan Patel	Sajidul Islam
Michael Mason	Mehrab Hossain Junior		Rajin Saleh
	Tamim Iqbal		Habibul Bashar
	Nazmul Hossain		Shahriar Nafees
	Sajidul Islam		Enamul Haque Jr
	Rajin Saleh

== Tour matches ==
=== Northern Districts (Game 1) ===
16 December
scorecard

Bangladesh; 222/8 (50 overs)	v	(New Zealand) Northern Districts; 228/3 (42.3 overs)
Junaid Siddique 73 (114); Brent Arnel 3/40 (10 overs)		Nick Horsley 92 (99); Farhad Reza 1/22 (7 overs)

Northern Districts won by 7 wickets
Seddon Park, Hamilton, New Zealand
Umpires: Tony Hill and Derek Walker

Bangladesh's first game on tour was a one-day match against the State Shield side Northern Districts. They lost two early wickets, both caught behind, before captain Mohammed Ashraful and debutant Junaid Siddique steadied the innings. Having reached 121 for two after 32 overs, they then lost five wickets for just 56 runs before lower-order batsmen Farhad Reza and Mashrafe Mortaza saw the innings through to 222. In response, Nick Horsley made a career-best 92 from 99 balls which, along with a quick-fire 55 from 39 balls by James Marshall, was enough to see Northern Districts win comfortably.

Bangladesh suffered a further setback during the game, with opening bowler Syed Rasel injuring his collarbone while fielding. Sajidul Islam was flown into the squad as a replacement after it was determined Rasel had dislocated the left collarbone.

=== Northern Districts (Game 2) ===
18 December
scorecard

(New Zealand) Northern Districts; 173/7 (41 overs)	v	Bangladesh
Kane Williamson 47* (56); Abdur Razzak 2/26 (7 overs)

No result
Seddon Park, Hamilton, New Zealand
Umpires: Billy Bowden and Tony Hill

- Match abandoned due to rain

The second tour match, also against Northern Districts, was eventually abandoned due to rain. After early rain had forced the match to be reduced to 41 overs per innings, Northern won the toss, decided to bat and made 173 for seven. Although they did not get a chance to bat, Bangladesh's bowling and fielding efforts were noticeably better than in the first game.

=== Auckland ===
21 December
scorecard

Bangladesh; 242 (48.5 overs)	v	(New Zealand) Auckland; 243/3 (46 overs)
Tamim Iqbal 104 (122); Greg Morgan 3/33 (8 overs)		Richard Jones 85* (88); Farhad Reza 1/36 (6 overs)

Auckland won by 7 wickets
Eden Park, Auckland, New Zealand
Umpires: Billy Bowden and Tony Hill

The third game on tour was against another provincial side, Auckland. Having won the toss, Bangladesh chose to bat; and opener Tamim Iqbal scored a century. In response, Auckland overhauled Bangladesh's total of 242 with ease, with Richard Jones top-scoring with 85 not out and each of the batsmen hitting at least one six in their innings.

=== Twenty20 ===
23 December
scorecard

New Zealand Cricket XI; 133/7 (20 overs)	v	Bangladesh; 134/6 (17 overs)
James Marshall 33* (26); Shahadat Hossain 3/15 (4 overs)		Farhad Reza 31 (17); Michael Mason 1/21 (4 overs)

Bangladesh won by 4 wickets
Seddon Park, Hamilton, New Zealand
Umpires: Gary Baxter and Tony Hill

A Twenty20 charity match was held between Bangladesh and a New Zealand Cricket XI with the funds raised going to people affected by Cyclone Sidr; the International Cricket Council donated an additional US$250,000 to the funds at the start of the match. Asked to bat first, the New Zealand side had a slow start, making just 19 runs for the loss of two wickets after 5.3 overs. Most of the batsmen seemed out of form and fell to injudicious shots, with an unbeaten 33 from James Marshall seeing the side through to 133 for seven from their 20 overs.

Bangladesh began their innings in a similar manner, losing their opening batsmen early. They recovered with Mohammad Ashraful and Aftab Ahmed scoring quick runs before being run out; the match was won with three overs to spare owing to the efforts of Shakib Al Hasan, Mehrab Hossain and top scorer Farhad Reza. Stephen Fleming, who captained the New Zealand side, later said that "it feels very tentative with the batting unit – there's been a lot of focus on it, the performances haven't been great and with that comes a certain amount of tension."

== ODI series ==
=== 1st ODI ===
26 December
scorecard

Bangladesh; 201/10 (46.3 overs)	v	New Zealand; 203/4 (42.4 overs)
Mohammad Ashraful 70 (57); Mark Gillespie 3/27 (8 overs)		Jamie How 88 (124); Shakib Al Hasan 3–57 (9.4 overs)

New Zealand won by 6 wickets
Eden Park, Auckland, New Zealand
Umpires: Gary Baxter and Peter Parker
Player of the match: Jamie How

Bangladesh batted first after New Zealand, captained by Daniel Vettori, won the toss and chose to bowl. Having lost two early wickets, a 97-run partnership between captain Mohammad Ashraful (who scored 70 from 57 balls in an innings that Vettori labeled as "outstanding") and Tamim Iqbal seemed to set Bangladesh up for a good score. However, they then lost their remaining seven wickets for just 51 runs to end on 201 runs, with coach Jamie Siddons admitting that they had been aiming for 280 when they should have been more concerned with ensuring a total of at least 250. In reply, New Zealand cruised to victory with six wickets and 44 balls to spare, led by 88 runs from opener Jamie How.

=== 2nd ODI ===
28 December
scorecard

New Zealand; 335/5 (50 overs)	v	Bangladesh; 181/6 (43 overs)
Peter Fulton 83 (93); Abdur Razzak 2/75 (10 overs)		Aftab Ahmed 54 (78); Kyle Mills 4/40 (10 overs)

New Zealand won by 102 runs (D/L method)
McLean Park, Napier, New Zealand
Umpires: Tony Hill and Peter Parker
Player of the match: Peter Fulton

- Rain caused play to be stopped after 43 overs of the second innings

New Zealand won the toss again, but chose to bat first this time. New Zealand made 335 in their innings, with all six players who batted reaching at least 30 runs. Having started with a 63-run opening partnership, Bangladesh lost three wickets in quick succession and from then on never threatened to overhaul New Zealand's score, with rain ending the match with seven overs remaining. After the game, questions were raised about Bangladesh's lack of interest in chasing the total; Siddons defended their tactics saying their plan was to conserve wickets for a final assault, but they lost the momentum after the loss of those three wickets.

=== 3rd ODI ===
31 December
scorecard

Bangladesh; 93/10 (37.5 overs)	v	New Zealand; 95/0 (6 overs)
Mohammed Ashraful 25 (31); Daniel Vettori 5/7 (6 overs)		Brendon McCullum 80* (28); Mashrafe Mortaza 0/20 (2 overs)

New Zealand won by 10 wickets
Queenstown Events Centre, Queenstown, New Zealand
Umpires: Tony Hill and Nigel Llong
Player of the match: Daniel Vettori

The only change to the teams for the third ODI was Michael Mason coming into the New Zealand side for Mark Gillespie who was injured in the second match. New Zealand won the toss for the third time in the series and, as in Auckland in the first match, asked Bangladesh to bat first. Bangladesh lost four early wickets and were at 46 for four after 19 overs. They couldn't recover as they were all out for 93 runs in the 38th over. In the process, Vettori became New Zealand's leading one-day wicket taker, overtaking Chris Harris with his second five-wicket haul; in addition, the five-wicket haul made him the top ODI wicket taker in the world in 2007. In reply, New Zealand blitzed the Bangladesh bowlers, taking just six overs to win without losing a wicket. Brendon McCullum scored an unbeaten 80 off just 28 balls (at a strike rate of 286) and Jamie How scored 7 not out having only faced eight balls.

== Test matches ==
=== 1st test ===
4–8 January
Scorecard

Bangladesh	v	New Zealand
137 (46.1 overs); Tamim Iqbal 53 (88); Chris Martin 4/64 (13 overs)		357 (91 overs); Jacob Oram 117 (166); Mashrafe Mortaza 4/74 (23 overs)
254 (83.1 overs); Tamim Iqbal 84 (128); Daniel Vettori 4/70 (24 overs)		39/1 (8.1 overs); Matthew Bell 20* (20); Mashrafe Mortaza 1/14 (4 overs)

New Zealand won by 9 wickets
University Oval, Dunedin, New Zealand
Umpires: Nigel Llong and Peter Parker
Player of the match: Jacob Oram

Once again, New Zealand won the toss and asked Bangladesh to bat first. Their first innings was similar to the final One Day International, with only opener Tamim Iqbal, who scored 53 on debut, offering any real resistance as Bangladesh made 137. Chris Martin took four wickets, ending the innings on 117 career wickets, 7th equal on the all-time New Zealand list with Richard Collinge, whileJacob Oram took three wickets.

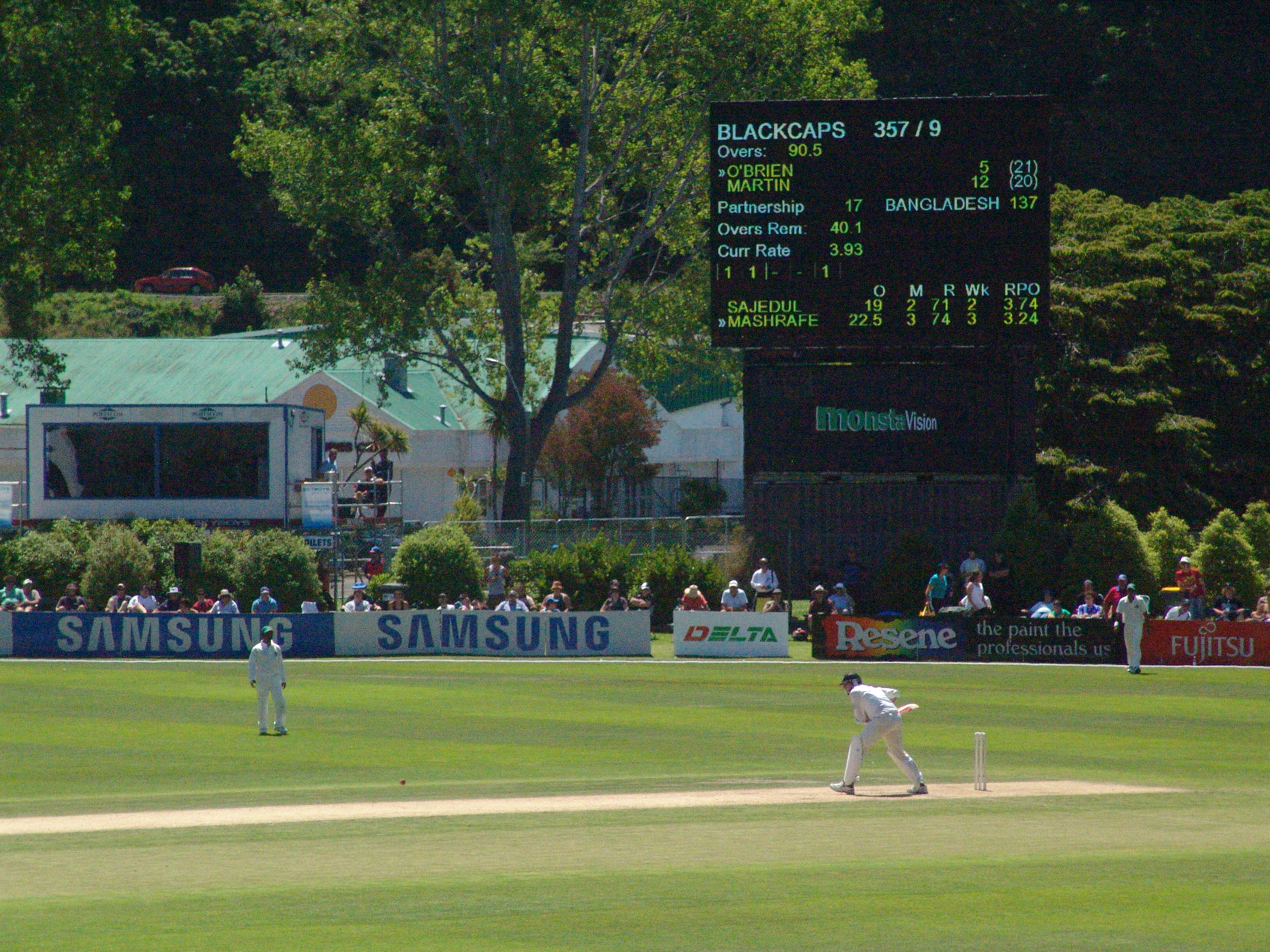
Iain O'Brien facing a ball from Mashrafe Mortaza on the second day of play. This delivery ended the New Zealand first innings as O'Brien edged it and was caught in the slips.

In response, New Zealand overtook the total on the first day, reaching 156/4 by stumps. The innings was led by Matthew Bell, playing his first test since 2001, who was 74 not out at the end of the first day's play. He reached his second test century in the morning session of the second day before being dismissed by Mohammad Ashraful. Jacob Oram also reached three figures, top-scoring with 117; however the rest of the batsmen did not make any major contribution with Daniel Vettori's 32 being the third highest score and only four players making more than twenty. Dismissing New Zealand for 357 marked the first time in seven tests that the Bangladeshi bowlers had dismissed a batting side.

Trailing by 220 runs, Bangladesh's second innings started in a markedly different manner to their first. Openers Tamim Iqbal and Junaid Siddique were both unbeaten at stumps on day two, and their 148-run stand broke the Bangladeshi record for the highest opening partnership. The batsmen, both playing their first Test match, had reached 72 and 69 respectively at the end of the day's play. However the pair were dismissed early on day three, with Bangladesh then collapsing to be 206/5 at lunch before being dismissed for 254. Needing just 35 runs for the victory, New Zealand wrapped the match up before tea on the third day with only the loss of Craig Cumming for four.

Vettori later said that he had been too attacking with the field settings at the start of the Bangladeshi second innings, and that advice from former captain Stephen Fleming and coach John Bracewell overnight led to a changed game plan on the third day with the desired results.

=== 2nd test ===
12–16 January
Scorecard

Bangladesh	v	New Zealand
143 (45.3 overs); Mohammad Ashraful 35 (51); Chris Martin 5/65 (16 overs)		393 (103.2 overs); Daniel Vettori 94 (87); Shahadat Hossain 3/83 (27 overs)
113/9 (47 overs); Shakib Al Hasan 41* (92); Jacob Oram 2/21 (11 overs)

New Zealand won by an innings and 137 runs
Basin Reserve, Wellington, New Zealand
Umpires: Nigel Llong and Peter Parker
Player of the match: Daniel Vettori

- Tamim Iqbal was unable to bat in the Bangladeshi second innings due to injury

In the second Test, New Zealand won their ninth toss in a row and asked Bangladesh to bat first. Their batting collapsed, similar to the first innings of the Dunedin test, as they went to lunch at 86 for five. Chris Martin and Iain O'Brien were the main wicket-takers with five and three wickets respectively as Bangladesh were dismissed for 143. Martin's five wicket haul was his eighth in tests and moved him up to sixth on New Zealand's all-time wicket taking list, equalling Ewen Chatfield with 123 wickets.

In response, New Zealand came within nine runs at the end of the first day's play as they finished on 134/3. Craig Cumming, whose spot in the side was under pressure from Jamie How, made 42 before being dismissed leg before wicket for the third innings in a row. At the close of play, Stephen Fleming was unbeaten on 39, as he looked for his first Test century on his home ground. On the morning of the second day, Bangladesh dropped four catches in the first 90 minutes before finally dismissing Mathew Sinclair. Fleming was also dropped from a skied shot before being dismissed for 87 off a similar shot. Vettori and Brendon McCullum put together an 81 run partnership at 5.28 runs per over before McCullum was dismissed; Vettori finished as the top scorer with 94. Despite leading by 250 runs after being dismissed for 393, there was some criticism of the ability of the batsmen to carry on to large scores, with five batsmen scoring at least 40 but none being able to break 100.

Bangladesh's second innings did not start any better than their first. With Tamim Iqbal unable to open the batting, having fractured his left thumb dropping a catch, they had lost five wickets by stumps on the second day. All of the wickets had been caught behind the wicket, with wicket-keeper McCullum taking one and the remainder being caught by the slips. At the end of the day's play, Bangladesh were 51/5 needing a further 199 runs to make New Zealand bat again and thus avoid an innings defeat. On the third day, the Black Caps required only 25 more overs to dismiss Bangladesh for an innings win. Only Shakib Al Hasan offered any resistance, finishing on an unbeaten 41. Equally telling was that Bangladesh's highest-scoring partnership in their second innings was 30 on the last wicket.
