= Sri Lankan cricket team in Bangladesh in 2005–06 =

Sri Lankans in Bangladesh in 2005-06
	Sri Lanka	Bangladesh
- Dates: 20 February – 12 March 2006
Captains	Mahela Jayawardene	Habibul Bashar

Test series
- Result: Sri Lanka won the 2-match series 2–0
Most runs	Upul Tharanga (297)	Habibul Bashar (183)
Most wickets	Muttiah Muralitharan (16)	Shahadat Hossain (9)
- Player of the series: Muttiah Muralitharan

One Day International series
- Results: Sri Lanka won the 3-match series 2–1
Most runs	Kumar Sangakkara (181)	Mohammad Ashraful (119)
Most wickets	Ruchira Perera (4); Sanath Jayasuriya (4); Dilhara Fernando, (4); Farveez Maharoof (4)	Mohammad Rafique (7)
- Player of the series: Kumar Sangakkara

The Sri Lankan cricket team toured Bangladesh for cricket matches during the 2005–06 season. The Sri Lankans rested many senior players on this tour, like Chaminda Vaas, Muttiah Muralitharan (Muttiah was only left out of the ODI squad) and the captain Marvan Attapatu. The role of the captain for this series was taken over by Mahela Jayawardene. The first match of the ODI series was the last game for veteran fast bowler Khaled Mahmud.

== Squads ==
Sri Lanka
- Mahela Jayawardene (c)
- Kumar Sangakkara (wk)
- Malinga Bandara
- Tillakaratne Dilshan
- Dilhara Fernando
- Hasantha Fernando
- Sanath Jayasuriya (ODI only)
- Prasanna Jayawardene
- Chamara Kapugedera
- Kaushal Lokuarachchi
- Farveez Maharoof
- Lasith Malinga
- Jehan Mubarak
- Muttiah Muralitharan (Test only)
- Ruchira Perera
- Dhammika Prasad
- Thilan Samaraweera
- Upul Tharanga
- Sajeewa Weerakoon
- Michael Vandort
Bangladesh
- Habibul Bashar c
- Khaled Mashud wk
- Abdur Razzak (ODI)
- Aftab Ahmed
- Alok Kapali
- Enamul Haque Jr (Test)
- Javed Omar
- Mashrafe Mortaza
- Mohammad Ashraful
- Mohammad Rafique
- Nafees Iqbal (Test)
- Rajin Saleh
- Shahadat Hossain
- Shahriar Nafees
- Syed Rasel
- Tushar Imran (ODI)

== Venues ==
Bogra	Chattogram
Shaheed Chandu Stadium	Zohur Ahmed Chowdhury Stadium
Capacity: 18,000	Capacity: 20,000
Sri Lankan cricket team in Bangladesh in 2005–06 is located in Bangladesh

== ODI series ==
=== 1st ODI ===
20 February 2006
Scorecard

Bangladesh; 118 (35.5 overs)	v	Sri Lanka; 119/5 (24.1 overs)
Khaled Mahmud 36 (62); Ruchira Perera 3/23 (7 overs)		Kumar Sangakkara 50 (62); Mohammad Rafique 2/10 (3 overs)

Sri Lanka won by 5 wickets
Shaheed Chandu Stadium, Bogra
Umpires: Krishna Hariharan (Ind) and Mahbubur Rahman (Ban)
Player of the match: Ruchira Perera (SL)

- Bangladesh won the toss and elected to bat.
- Khaled Mahmud played his last international match

=== 2nd ODI ===
22 February 2006
Scorecard

Sri Lanka; 212 (49 overs)	v	Bangladesh; 213/6 (47 overs)
Sanath Jayasuriya 96 (110); Syed Rasel 2/28 (10 overs)		Mohammad Ashraful 51 (71); Dilhara Fernando 2/48 (8 overs)

Bangladesh won by 4 wickets
Shaheed Chandu Stadium, Bogra
Umpires: Krishna Hariharan (Ind) and Mahbubur Rahman (Ban)
Player of the match: Aftab Ahmed (Ban)

- Bangladesh won the toss and elected to field.

=== 3rd ODI ===
25 February 2006
Scorecard

Sri Lanka; 309/7 (50 overs)	v	Bangladesh; 231/9 (50 overs)
Kumar Sangakkara 109 (125); Mohammad Rafique 3/61 (10 overs)		Mohammad Ashraful 64 (67); Tillakaratne Dilshan 2/14 (5 overs)

Sri Lanka won by 78 runs
Zohur Ahmed Chowdhury Stadium, Chittagong
Umpires: A. F. M. Akhtaruddin (Ban) and Krishna Hariharan (Ind)
Player of the match: Kumar Sangakkara (SL)

- Bangladesh won the toss and elected to field.

== Test series ==
=== 1st Test ===
28 February – 3 March 2006
Scorecard

Bangladesh	v	Sri Lanka
319 (91.5 overs); Mohammad Ashraful 136 (184); Lasith Malinga 4/57 (16.5 overs)		338 (97.1 overs); Farveez Maharoof 72 (133); Shahadat Hossain 4/83 (22 overs)
181 (58.5 overs); Mohammad Rafique 40 (49); Muttiah Muralitharan 6/54 (19.5 overs)		163/2 (37 overs); Michael Vandort 64* (105); Syed Rasel 1/18 (8 overs)

Sri Lanka won by 8 wickets
Zohur Ahmed Chowdhury Stadium, Chittagong
Umpires: Asad Rauf (Pak) and Steve Bucknor (WI)
Player of the match: Mohammad Ashraful (Ban)

- Bangladesh won the toss and elected to bat.
- Muttiah Muralitharan (SL) played in his 100th Test.

=== 2nd Test ===
8–12 March 2006
Scorecard

Bangladesh	v	Sri Lanka
234 (76.5 overs); Habibul Bashar 69 (120); Muttiah Muralitharan 5/79 (30.5 overs)		316 (103.3 overs); Upul Tharanga 165 (304); Shahadat Hossain 5/86 (21.3 overs)
201 (56.1 overs); Habibul Bashar 73 (104); Lasith Malinga 3/51 (14.1 overs); Dilhara Fernando 3/51 (19 overs)		120/0 (28 overs); Upul Tharanga 71* (87)

Sri Lanka won by 10 wickets
Shaheed Chandu Stadium, Bogra
Umpires: Asad Rauf (Pak) and Krishna Hariharan (Ind)
Player of the match: Upul Tharanga (SL)

- Bangladesh won the toss and elected to bat
