= Bangladeshi cricket team in New Zealand in 2001–02 =

	New Zealand	Bangladesh
- Dates: 18 December 2001 – 29 December 2001
Captains	Stephen Fleming	Khaled Mashud

Test series
- Result: New Zealand won the 2-match series 2–0
Most runs	Mark Richardson (226)	Habibul Bashar (100)
Most wickets	Chris Cairns (13)	Manjural Islam Rana (5)

The Bangladesh national cricket team toured New Zealand in November and December 2001 and played a two-match Test series against the New Zealand national cricket team. New Zealand won both Test matches convincingly to take the series 2–0. New Zealand were captained by Stephen Fleming and Bangladesh by Khaled Mashud.

== Squads ==
New Zealand Test	Bangladesh Test
Stephen Fleming (c); Nathan Astle; Chris Cairns; Craig McMillan; Daniel Vettori; Lou Vincent; Shane Bond; Chris Martin; Adam Parore (wk); Mathew Sinclair; Mark Richardson; Matt Horne; Chris Drum	Khaled Mashud (c & wk); Habibul Bashar; Javed Omar; Mohammad Ashraful; Khaled Mahmud; Mashrafe Mortaza; Mohammad Sharif; Aminul Islam; Sanwar Hossain; Al Sahariar; Manjural Islam Rana; Hasibul Hossain

== Tour matches ==
=== First match ===
7–9 December 2001
scorecard

District Association XI	v	Bangladesh
232/3d (100.4 overs); Harley James 117 (226); Mohammad Ashraful 2/49 (13 overs)

Match drawn
Victoria Park, Wanganui
Umpires: Billy Bowden (NZ) and Dave Quested (NZ)

- New Zealand District Association XI won the toss and elected to bat
- No play was possible on Day 2 and 3 due to rain.
- 4-day match
- Grant Robinson retired hurt for 1 after being hit on helmet in the 9th over

=== Second match ===
12–15 December 2001
scorecard

Bangladesh	v	Auckland
120 (61.2 overs); Khaled Mashud 30 (78); Chris Drum 4/32 (18 overs)		495 (143.3 overs); Matt Horne 178 (277); Manjurul Islam 4/105 (38 overs)
182 (75.3 overs); Aminul Islam 79 (178); Chris Drum 6/34 (21.3 overs)

Auckland won by an innings and 193 runs
Eden Park Outer Oval, Auckland
Umpires: Tony Hill (NZ) and Doug Cowie (NZ)

- Auckland won the toss and elected to bowl
- 4-day match

== Test Series ==
=== First Test ===
18–22 December 2001
scorecard

New Zealand	v	Bangladesh
365/9 (77.1 overs); Mark Richardson 143 (191); Mashrafe Mortaza 3/100 (27 overs)		205 (58.1 overs); Habibul Bashar 61 (84); Shane Bond 4/47 (13.1 overs)
		108 (46.2 overs); Al Sahariar 53 (103); Chris Cairns 7/53 18.2 overs)

New Zealand won by an innings and 52 runs
Seddon Park, Hamilton
Umpires: Tony Hill (NZ) and Dave Orchard (Aus)
Player of the match: Mark Richardson (NZ)

- Bangladesh won the toss and elected to bowl
- No play was possible on Day 1 and 2 due to rain.
- Sanwar Hossain (Ban) made his test debut.

=== Second Test ===
26–29 December 2001
scorecard

Bangladesh	v	New Zealand
132 (64 overs); Aminul Islam 42 (134); Chris Cairns 3/24 (15 overs)		341/6 (88 overs); Mark Richardson 83 (167); Manjural Islam Rana 3/99 (29 overs)
135 (41 overs); Habibul Bashar 32 (44); Shane Bond 4/54 (15 overs)

New Zealand won by an innings and 74 runs
Basin Reserve, Wellington
Umpires: Billy Bowden (NZ) and Daryl Harper (Aus)
Player of the match: Craig McMillan (NZ)

- New Zealand won the toss and elected to bowl
- No play was possible on day 2 due to rain.
