= Bangladeshi cricket team in Zimbabwe in 2003–04 =

	Zimbabwe	Bangladesh
- Dates: 19 February 2004 – 14 March 2004
Captains	Heath Streak	Habibul Bashar

Test series
- Result: Zimbabwe won the 2-match series 1–0
Most runs	Stuart Carlisle (194)	Manjural Islam Rana (105)
Most wickets	Ray Price (8)	Tapash Baisya (7)

One Day International series
- Results: Zimbabwe won the 5-match series 2–1
Most runs	Barney Rogers (131)	Rajin Saleh (90)
Most wickets	Heath Streak (7)	Tareq Aziz (7)
- Player of the series: Heath Streak (Zim)

The Bangladeshi cricket team toured Zimbabwe for a two-match Test series and a five-match One Day International (ODI) series between 19 February and 14 March 2004. Zimbabwe won the Test series 1–0 and the ODI series 2–1.

== Test series ==
=== 1st Test ===
19–23 February 2004
Scorecard

Zimbabwe	v	Bangladesh
441 (160.2 overs); Sean Ervine 86 (197); Mohammad Rafique 4/121 (57 overs)		331 (115.4 overs); Mohammad Ashraful 98 (181); Heath Streak 4/44 (26.2 overs)
242/8 dec (64.2 overs); Sean Ervine 74 (78); Manjural Islam Rana 2/40 (7.2 overs)		169 (57.5 overs); Khaled Mashud 61 (89); Ray Price 4/61 (20.5 overs)

Zimbabwe won by 183 runs
Harare Sports Club, Harare
Umpires: Neil Mallender (Eng) and Dave Orchard (SA)
Player of the match: Sean Ervine (Zim)

- Zimbabwe won the toss and elected to bat.

=== 2nd Test ===
26 February – 1 March 2004
Scorecard

Bangladesh	v	Zimbabwe
168 (75.5 overs); Manjural Islam Rana 39 (87); Ray Price 3/20 (8.5 overs)		210/2 (60.2 overs); Stuart Carlisle 103* (173); Tapash Baisya 2/43 (15 overs)

Match drawn
Queens Sports Club, Bulawayo
Umpires: Neil Mallender (Eng) and Dave Orchard (SA)

- Zimbabwe won the toss and elected to field.
- No play on days one, two and four.

== ODI series ==
=== 1st ODI ===
6 March 2004
Scorecard

Zimbabwe	v	Bangladesh

Match abandoned without a ball bowled
Queens Sports Club, Bulawayo
Umpires: Dave Orchard (SA) and Ian Robinson (Zim)

=== 2nd ODI ===
7 March 2004
Scorecard

Zimbabwe	v	Bangladesh

Match abandoned without a ball bowled
Queens Sports Club, Bulawayo
Umpires: Kevan Barbour (Zim) and Neil Mallender (Eng)

=== 3rd ODI ===
10 March 2004
Scorecard

Bangladesh; 238/7 (50 overs)	v	Zimbabwe; 230/9 (50 overs)
Habibul Bashar 61 (80); Grant Flower 1/24 (7 overs)		Stuart Carlisle 71 (96); Tareq Aziz 3/38 (6 overs)

Bangladesh won by 8 runs
Harare Sports Club, Harare
Umpires: Brian Jerling (SA) and Ian Robinson (Zim)
Player of the match: Mohammad Ashraful (Ban)

- Zimbabwe won the toss and elected to field.

=== 4th ODI ===
12 March 2004
Scorecard

Zimbabwe; 242/8 (50 overs)	v	Bangladesh; 228 (49.2 overs)
Sean Ervine 50 (85); Tapash Baisya 3/45 (10 overs)		Mushfiqur Rahman 49 (70); Heath Streak 4/30 (10 overs)

Zimbabwe won by 14 runs
Harare Sports Club, Harare
Umpires: Brian Jerling (SA) and Kevan Barbour (Zim)
Player of the match: Heath Streak (Zim)

- Zimbabwe won the toss and elected to bat.

=== 5th ODI ===
14 March 2004
Scorecard

Bangladesh; 183 (48.5 overs)	v	Zimbabwe; 185/7 (42.3 overs)
Manjural Islam Rana 63 (98); Grant Flower 3/36 (10 overs)		Grant Flower 59 (87); Khaled Mahmud 4/19 (10 overs)

Zimbabwe won by 3 wickets
Harare Sports Club, Harare
Umpires: Brian Jerling (SA) and Ian Robinson (Zim)
Player of the match: Khaled Mahmud (Ban)

- Bangladesh won the toss and elected to bat.
