= South African cricket team in Bangladesh in 2007–08 =

	Bangladesh	South Africa
- Dates: 17 February 2008 – 18 March 2008
Captains	Mohammad Ashraful	Graeme Smith

Test series
- Result: South Africa won the 2-match series 2–0
Most runs	Shahriar Nafees (141)	Graeme Smith (304)
Most wickets	Shahadat Hossain (12)	Dale Steyn (14)
- Player of the series: Dale Steyn (SA)

One Day International series
- Results: South Africa won the 3-match series 3–0
Most runs	Raqibul Hasan (90); Tamim Iqbal (90)	Graeme Smith (199)
Most wickets	Abdur Razzak (3)	André Nel (7)
- Player of the series: Graeme Smith (SA)

The South Africa national cricket team toured Bangladesh for two Test matches and three One Day Internationals in February and March 2008. For South Africa, it represented the first tour after the retirement of bowler Shaun Pollock while Bangladesh were looking to rebuild after heavy defeats against New Zealand and Sri Lanka.

The naming of South Africa's squad was delayed for over a week after a selection row. The squad presented to Cricket South Africa (CSA) chiefs did not contain the expected number of black players (six) although this squad was eventually ratified and named to travel. There was a late change when Robin Peterson replaced Paul Harris who had to undergo surgery for an abscess.

Bangladesh recalled veteran left-arm spinner Mohammad Rafique to their Test squad, his first inclusion since July 2007.

== Squads ==
Test		ODI	
Bangladesh	South Africa	Bangladesh	South Africa
Mohammad Ashraful (c); Mushfiqur Rahim (wk); Aftab Ahmed; Abdur Razzak; Enamul Haque Jr; Habibul Bashar; Junaid Siddique; Mashrafe Mortaza; Mohammad Rafique; Rajin Saleh; Sajidul Islam; Shahadat Hossain; Shahriar Nafees; Shakib Al Hasan; Tamim Iqbal	Graeme Smith (c); Mark Boucher (wk); Hashim Amla; Johan Botha; AB de Villiers; JP Duminy; Paul Harris; Jacques Kallis; Neil McKenzie; Morné Morkel; André Nel; Makhaya Ntini; Ashwell Prince; Dale Steyn	Mohammad Ashraful (c); Dhiman Ghosh (wk); Mashrafe Mortaza; Abdur Razzak; Farhad Reza; Junaid Siddique; Mosharraf Hossain; Nazimuddin; Raqibul Hasan; Shahadat Hossain; Shahriar Nafees; Shakib Al Hasan; Syed Rasel; Tamim Iqbal	Graeme Smith (c); AB de Villiers (wk); Hashim Amla; Johan Botha; JP Duminy; Herschelle Gibbs; Paul Harris; Charl Langeveldt; Albie Morkel; Morné Morkel; André Nel; Alviro Petersen; Dale Steyn; Vernon Philander (withdrawn)

== Matches ==
=== Test series ===
==== 1st Test ====
22–26 February
Scorecard

Bangladesh	v	South Africa
192 (54.4 overs); Aftab Ahmed 44 (84); Morné Morkel 5/50 (13 overs)		170 (60.3 overs); AB de Villiers 46 (73); Shahadat Hossain 6/27 (15.3 overs)
182 (73 overs); Junaid Siddique 74 (184); Jacques Kallis 5/30 (14 overs)		205/5 (67.5 overs); Graeme Smith 62 (104); Shahadat Hossain 3/70 (19 overs)

South Africa won by 5 wickets
Sher-e-Bangla Cricket Stadium, Mirpur
Umpires: Aleem Dar (Pak) and Steve Bucknor (WI)
Player of the match: Jacques Kallis (SA)

- Bangladesh won the toss and elected to bat.

==== 2nd Test ====
29 February – 4 March
Scorecard

South Africa	v	Bangladesh
583/7d (161.1 overs); Graeme Smith 232 (277); Shahadat Hossain 3/107 (25 overs)		259 (70.4 overs); Shahriar Nafees 69 (98); Makhaya Ntini 4/35 (13.4 overs)
		119 (f/o) (39.5 overs); Abdur Razzak 32* (40); Robin Peterson 5/33 (13 overs)

South Africa won by an innings and 205 runs
Chittagong Divisional Stadium, Chittagong
Umpires: Aleem Dar (Pak) and Steve Bucknor (WI)
Player of the match: Graeme Smith (SA)

- South Africa won the toss and elected to bat.
- South Africa's opening partnership between Graeme Smith and Neil McKenzie put on a total of 415 runs, surpassing the previous world record opening partnership of 413 set by India's Vinoo Mankad and Pankaj Roy.
- This was last international match of Mohammad Rafique. He also became first Bangladesh bowler to pick 100 wickets in test cricket.

=== ODI series ===
==== 1st ODI ====
9 March
09:30
Scorecard

Bangladesh; 178 (48.2 overs)	v	South Africa; 180/1 (36.5 overs)
Tamim Iqbal 82 (98); André Nel 3/24 (10 overs)		Graeme Smith 103* (118); Shakib Al Hasan 1/29 (8.5 overs)

South Africa won by 9 wickets
Chittagong Divisional Stadium, Chittagong
Umpires: Aleem Dar (Pak) and Enamul Haque (Ban)
Player of the match: Graeme Smith (SA)

- Bangladesh won the toss and elected to bat.
- Dhiman Ghosh, Mosharraf Hossain, Raqibul Hasan (all Ban), Hashim Amla and Paul Harris (both SA) made their ODI debuts.

==== 2nd ODI ====
12 March
09:30
Scorecard

Bangladesh; 173 (48.2 overs)	v	South Africa; 179/3 (48.1 overs)
Raqibul Hasan 63 (105); André Nel 4/27 (10 overs)		AB de Villiers 69* (112); Abdur Razzak 2/32 (10 overs)

South Africa win by 7 wickets
Sher-e-Bangla Cricket Stadium, Mirpur
Umpires: Aleem Dar (Pak) and Nadir Shah (Ban)
Player of the match: André Nel (SA)

- Bangladesh won the toss and elected to bat.
- Nazimuddin (Ban) made his ODI debut.

==== 3rd ODI ====
14 March
09:30
Scorecard

Bangladesh; 143 (42.5 overs)	v	South Africa; 147/3 (34.2 overs)
Shahriar Nafees 25 (33); Albie Morkel 4/29 (8 overs)		Graeme Smith 68* (94); Mosharraf Hossain 1/26 (6 overs)

South Africa win by 7 wickets
Sher-e-Bangla Cricket Stadium, Mirpur
Umpires: Aleem Dar (Pak) and Nadir Shah (Ban)
Player of the match: Albie Morkel (SA)

- Bangladesh won the toss and elected to bat.

=== Tour matches ===
==== Bangladesh Cricket Board XI v South Africans ====
17–19 February
Scorecard

South Africans	v	(Bangladesh) BCB XI
397 (109.3 overs); MV Boucher 107* (164); Farhad Reza 3/73 (27 overs)		412/9d (102.3 overs); Junaid Siddique 103 (168); JA Botha 4/76 (24.3 overs)
47/0 (9 overs); GC Smith 32* (31)

Match drawn
Fatullah Osmani Stadium, Fatullah
Umpires: Mahfuzur Rahman (Ban) and Nadir Shah (Ban)

- South Africans won the toss and elected to bat.
- Both sides used 12 players, 11 per innings.

==== Bangladesh Cricket Board XI v South Africans ====
7 March
09:30
Scorecard

BCB XI (Bangladesh); 243/7 (50 overs)	v	South Africa; 243/8 (50 overs)
Mahmudullah 37* (33); Paul Harris 2/30 (8 overs)		Graeme Smith 70 (82); Mosharraf Hossain 3/19 (8 overs)

Match tied
Chittagong Divisional Stadium, Chittagong
Umpires: Enamul Haque (Ban) and Sharafudoulla (Ban)

- Bangladesh Cricket Board XI won the toss and elected to bat.
- Both sides used 13 players, 11 per innings.
