= Najmul Hossain Shanto =

Bangladesh cricketer

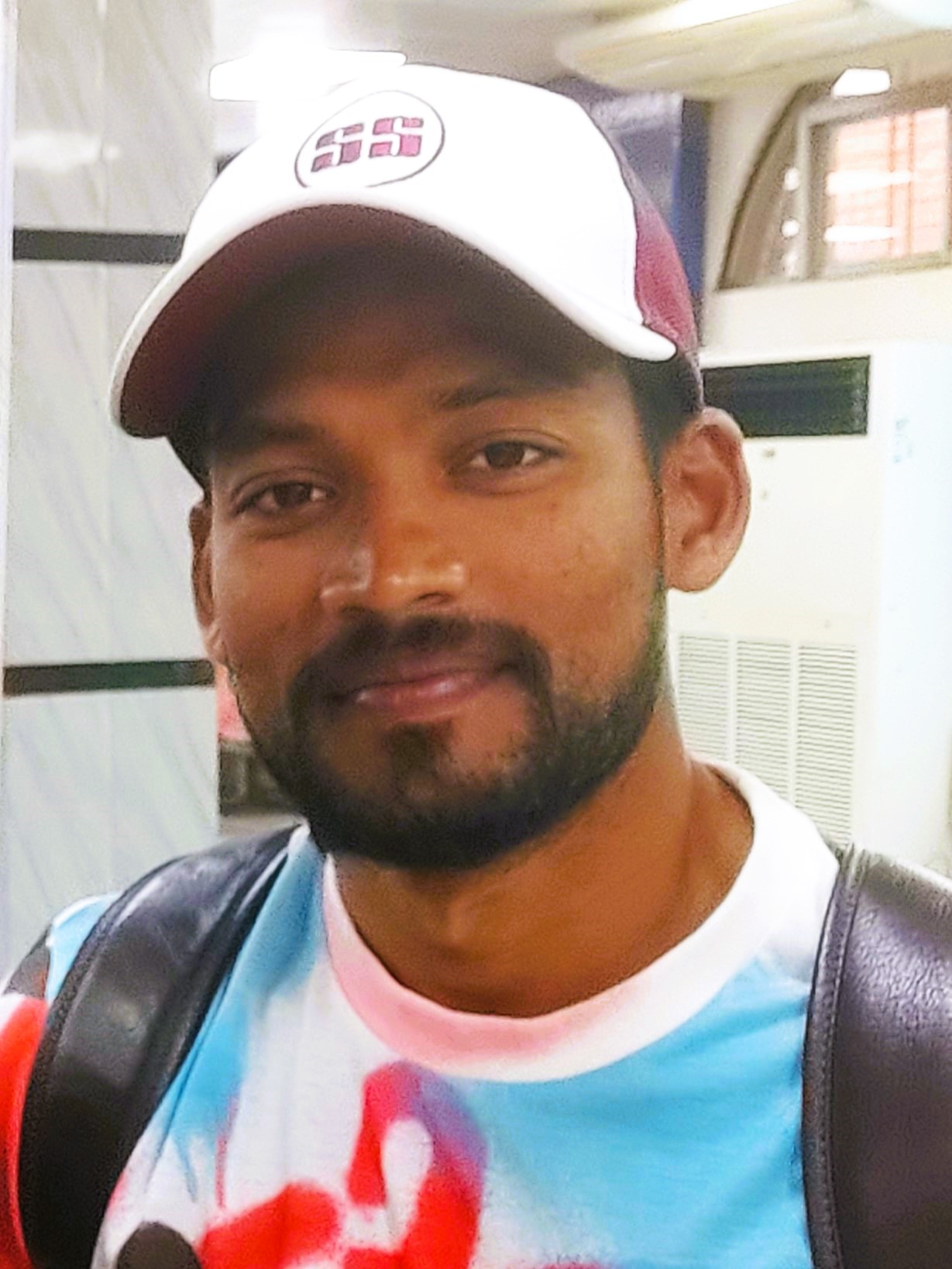
- Shanto in 2023

Personal information
- Full name: Najmul Hossain Shanto
- Born: 25 August 1998 (age 28); Rajshahi, Bangladesh
- Batting: Left-handed
- Bowling: Right-arm off break
- Role: Top-order batter

International information
- National side: Bangladesh (2017–present)
- Test debut (cap 84): 20 January 2017 v New Zealand
- Last Test: 13 August 2026 v Australia
- ODI debut (cap 127): 20 September 2018 v Afghanistan
- Last ODI: 11 July 2026 v Zimbabwe
- ODI shirt no.: 99
- T20I debut (cap 66): 18 September 2019 v Zimbabwe
- Last T20I: 19 May 2025 v UAE
- T20I shirt no.: 99

Domestic team information
- Years: Team
- 2015: Kalabagan
- 2016–2017: Comilla Victorians
- 2017–2018: Rajshahi Division
- 2020-present: Abahani Limited
- 2019-2020: Khulna Tigers
- 2021/22: Fortune Barishal
- 2023–2024: Sylhet Strikers
- 2024/25: Fortune Barishal

Career statistics
Competition	Test	ODI	T20I	FC
Matches	43	70	50	90
Runs scored	2,663	2,076	987	5,880
Batting average	34.14	32.43	22.95	39.20
100s/50s	9/7	4/12	0/4	17/24
Top score	163	122*	71	253*
Balls bowled	118	116	18	647
Wickets	0	2	0	7
Bowling average	–	61.50	–	60.14
5 wickets in innings	–	0	–	0
10 wickets in match	–	0	–	0
Best bowling	–	1/10	–	2/44
Catches/stumpings	40/–	23/–	30/–	70/–
Medal record
Men's Cricket
Representing Bangladesh
South Asian Games
Gold medal – first place	2019 Kathmandu/Pokhara	Team
- Source: ESPNcricinfo, 16 August 2026

Najmul Hossain Shanto (Bengali: নাজমুল হোসেন শান্ত; born 25 August 1998) is a Bangladeshi cricket left-handed batter who has played for the Bangladesh national team since 2017. Batting at the top order, he has scored 2,486 runs in Tests with an average of 34.05, and 1,914 runs in One Day Internationals (ODIs) with an average of 32.44. He has served as the Test captain of Bangladesh since 2023. Shanto was the ODI captain from 2023 to 2025, and the Twenty20 International (T20I) captain from 2023 to 2024. Statistically, Shanto is Bangladesh's most successful Test captain, holding the national record for the most Test match victories (9) as well as the highest win–loss ratio among regular captains. He surpassed Mushfiqur Rahim's previous record of seven Test wins.

== Early and personal life ==
Shanto comes from Ranhat in Rajshahi, and began his cricket training at the Clemon Rajshahi Cricket Academy. The academy was almost 20 kilometres away from his home, so he would cycle and walk each day to get there.

He married Sabrin Sultana Ratna in 2020.

== Domestic career ==
He made his Twenty20 (T20) debut on 8 November 2016 playing for Comilla Victorians in the 2016–17 Bangladesh Premier League.

In December 2017, he and Mizanur Rahman, batting for Rajshahi Division against Dhaka Metropolis in the 2017–18 National Cricket League, made the highest opening partnership in a domestic first-class match in Bangladesh, scoring 341 runs.

He was the leading run-scorer in the 2017–18 Dhaka Premier Division Cricket League, with 749 runs in 16 matches.

In October 2018, he was named in the squad for the Khulna Titans team, following the draft for the 2018–19 Bangladesh Premier League. In August 2019, he was one of 35 cricketers named in a training camp ahead of Bangladesh's 2019–20 season. In November 2019, he was selected to play for the Khulna Tigers in the 2019–20 Bangladesh Premier League.

On 8 December 2020, in the 2020–21 Bangabandhu T20 Cup, Najmul scored a century for Minister Group Rajshahi against Fortune Barishal.

In November 2022, he was selected to play for Sylhet Strikers, following the players' draft for the 2022–23 Bangladesh Premier League. He became the first Bangladeshi player to score more than 500 runs in a BPL season. He went on to win the player of the tournament award for his performance.

== International career ==
In November 2016, he was named in a 22-man preparatory squad to train in Australia, ahead of Bangladesh's tour to New Zealand. In January 2017 he was added to Bangladesh's Test squad ahead of the second Test against New Zealand. He made his Test debut in the second Test against New Zealand on 20 January 2017.

In August 2018, he was one of the twelve debutants to be selected for a 31-man preliminary squad for Bangladesh ahead of the 2018 Asia Cup. He made his One Day International (ODI) debut for Bangladesh against Afghanistan on 20 September 2018.

In December 2018, he was named in Bangladesh's team for the 2018 ACC Emerging Teams Asia Cup. After being dropped from the team since 2018 Asia Cup, he was again recalled for the 2019–20 Bangladesh Tri-Nation Series. He made his Twenty20 International (T20I) debut for Bangladesh, against Zimbabwe, on 18 September 2019.

In November 2019, he was named as the captain of Bangladesh's squad for the 2019 ACC Emerging Teams Asia Cup in Bangladesh. Later the same month, he was named as the captain of Bangladesh's squad for the men's cricket tournament at the 2019 South Asian Games. The Bangladesh team went on to win the gold medal, after they beat Sri Lanka by seven wickets in the final.

In April 2021, in the opening match of the two-match series against Sri Lanka, he scored his first century in Test cricket, with 163 runs in the first innings. In July 2021, Shanto scored his second Test hundred against Zimbabwe in Harare.

In September 2022, Shanto was named in Bangladesh's squad for the 2022 ICC Men's T20 World Cup. On 30 October 2022, in the match against Zimbabwe, Shanto scored his maiden half-century in T20I cricket. His score of 71 runs off 55 balls helped Bangladesh to win the match by 3 runs. He was the highest run-scorer for Bangladesh in that tournament hitting 180 runs, including another fifty against Pakistan.

In March 2023, he was named in Bangladesh's T20I and ODI squad for their series against England. On 1 March 2023, in the second ODI, he claimed his maiden half-century in ODI cricket. He continued his good form scoring 51 runs off just 30 balls in the first T20I, helping Bangladesh to win the match by 6 wickets and clinch their first T20I win against England.

In the one-off Test against Afghanistan in June 2023, Shanto became the second Bangladeshi to score two centuries in a Test, scoring 146 and 124 runs respectively.

In December 2023, he scored his 5th hundred of the test career which came against New Zealand in the first test of the 3-match series. Bangladesh went on to win that match by 150 runs.

In May 2024, he was named as a captain in Bangladesh's squad for the 2024 ICC Men's T20 World Cup tournament.

=== Captaincy ===
In February 2024, Shanto was named captain of the Bangladesh cricket team for all formats by the selection committee.

In March 2024, Shanto scored 122* runs not out against Sri Lanka in the first match of a 3-game ODI series. This is the highest score by a Bangladeshi captain in men's ODIs.

After stepping down from Test captaincy following the Sri Lanka series in June 2025, Shanto resumed the role ahead of the Test series against Ireland in November 2025.

In the 1st ODI against Pakistan, Shanto scored 27 off 33 and became the 9th Bangladeshi batter to acheibe 5000 runs in international cricket.

In August 2026, under Shanto's captaincy, Bangladesh won their first ever Test match in Australia, beating them by 9 wickets in Darwin. Shanto now has the most away wins for a Bangladeshi Test captain.

== International centuries ==
Test centuries scored by Najmul Hossain Shanto
No.	Runs	Against	Venue	H/A	Date	Result	Ref
1	163	Sri Lanka	Pallekele International Cricket Stadium, Kandy	Away	21 April 2021	Drawn	
2	117*	Zimbabwe	Harare Sports Club, Harare	Away	7 July 2021	Won	
3	146	Afghanistan	Sher-e-Bangla National Cricket Stadium, Dhaka	Home	14 June 2023	Won	
4	124	Afghanistan	Sher-e-Bangla National Cricket Stadium, Dhaka	Home	14 June 2023	Won	
5	105	New Zealand	Sylhet International Cricket Stadium, Sylhet	Home	28 November 2023	Won	
6	148	Sri Lanka	Galle International Stadium, Galle	Away	17 June 2025	Drawn	
7	125*	Sri Lanka	Galle International Stadium, Galle	Away	21 June 2025	Drawn	
8	100	Ireland	Sylhet International Cricket Stadium, Sylhet	Home	13 November 2025	Won	
9	101	Pakistan	Sher-e-Bangla National Cricket Stadium, Dhaka	Home	8 May 2026	Won	

One Day International centuries scored by Najmul Hossain Shanto
No.	Runs	Against	Venue	H/A/N	Date	Result	Ref
1	117	Ireland	County Ground, Chelmsford	Away	12 May 2023	Won	
2	104	Afghanistan	Gaddafi Stadium, Lahore	Neutral	3 September 2023	Won	
3	122*	Sri Lanka	Zahur Ahmed Chowdhury Stadium Chittagong	Home	13 March 2024	Won	
4	105	New Zealand	Bir Shrestho Flight Lieutenant Matiur Rahman Cricket Stadium, Chittagong	Home	23 April 2026	Won	

Preceded by Shakib Al Hasan	Bangladesh national cricket captain (Test); 2024–present	Succeeded by Incumbent
Preceded by Shakib Al Hasan	Bangladesh national cricket captain (ODI); 2023–2025	Succeeded by Mehidy Hasan Miraz
Preceded by Shakib Al Hasan	Bangladesh national cricket captain (T20I); 2023–2024	Succeeded by Litton Das
