= Harley James =

New Zealand cricketer (born 1978)

Personal information
- Born: 29 July 1978 (age 48); Wellington, New Zealand
- Source: Cricinfo, 17 October 2020

Harley James (born 29 July 1978) is a New Zealand cricketer. He played in five first-class matches for Canterbury from 1997 to 2001.

In 2018, James was imprisoned for possession of child sex abuse images.
