= Nick Horsley =

New Zealand cricketer (born 1980)

Nicholas Keith Woodward Horsley (born 22 September 1980 in Hamilton) is a New Zealand cricketer who played in the 2000 U-19 Cricket World Cup in Sri Lanka. He also played for the Northern Districts Knights and the Auckland Aces in the State Championship and in the State Shield. He also plays for South Canterbury in the Hawke Cup.

== See also ==
- List of Auckland representative cricketers
