= Mohammad Ashraful =

Bangladeshi cricketer (born 1984)

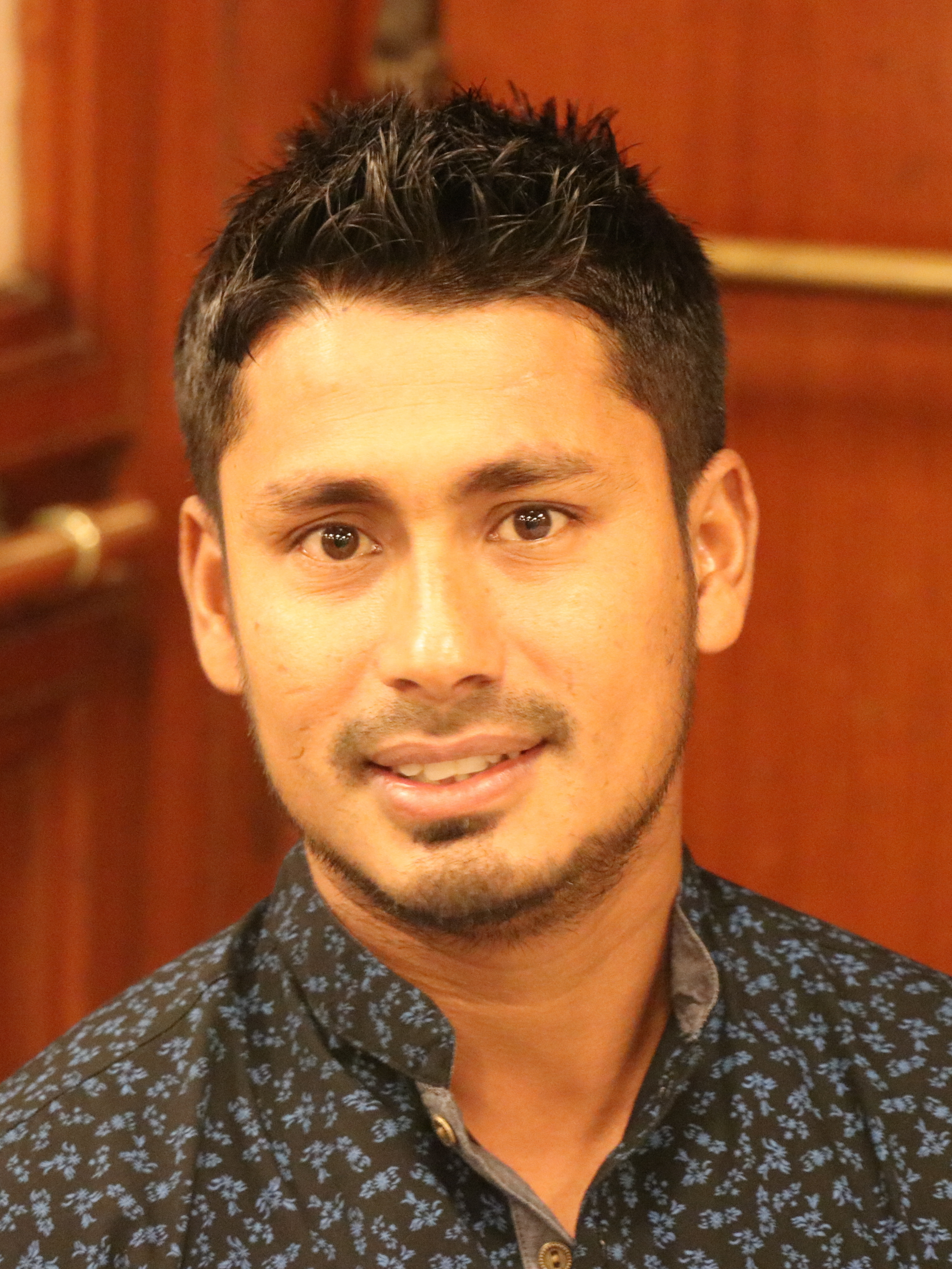
- Ashraful in 2018

Personal information
- Born: 7 July 1984 (age 42); Dhaka, Bangladesh
- Batting: Right-handed
- Bowling: Right-arm off break; Right-arm leg break
- Role: Middle-order batsman

International information
- National side: Bangladesh (2001–2013)
- Test debut (cap 17): 6 September 2001 v Sri Lanka
- Last Test: 25 April 2013 v Zimbabwe
- ODI debut (cap 52): 11 April 2001 v Zimbabwe
- Last ODI: 8 May 2013 v Zimbabwe
- ODI shirt no.: 98
- T20I debut (cap 14): 1 September 2007 v Kenya
- Last T20I: 31 March 2013 v Sri Lanka

Domestic team information
- Years: Team
- 2000–2001: Dhaka Metropolis
- 2001–2011: Dhaka Division
- 2008–2023: Mohammedan Sporting Club
- 2009: Mumbai Indians
- 2011-2023: Dhaka Metropolis
- 2012–2013: Dhaka Gladiators
- 2012: Ruhuna Royals
- 2019: Chittagong Vikings
- 2020: Minister Group Rajshahi

Career statistics
Competition	Test	ODI	T20I	FC
Matches	61	177	23	183
Runs scored	2,737	3,468	450	9,192
Batting average	24.02	22.24	19.56	28.63
100s/50s	6/8	3/20	0/2	21/42
Top score	190	109	65	263
Balls bowled	1,733	697	138	12,880
Wickets	21	18	8	214
Bowling average	60.52	36.72	26.25	34.98
5 wickets in innings	0	0	0	7
10 wickets in match	0	0	0	0
Best bowling	2/42	3/26	3/42	7/99
Catches/stumpings	25/–	86/–	4/–	87/–
Medal record
Representing Bangladesh
Men's Cricket
Asian Games
Gold medal – first place	2010 Guangzhou	Team
- Source: ESPNcricinfo, 20 March 2025

Mohammad Ashraful (Bengali: মোহাম্মদ আশরাফুল; born 7 July 1984) is a Bangladeshi cricketer, who has represented the Bangladesh men's national team.

Between 2007 and 2009, Ashraful captained his country in 13 Tests, and 38 One Day Internationals (ODIs), out of which Bangladesh won eight. Ashraful has scored the fastest fifty in Test and ODI for any Bangladeshi cricketer.

Ashraful also played domestic cricket for the Dhaka Division cricket team in Bangladesh's domestic one-day and first-class competitions, captaining both sides on occasion.

In 2014 the Bangladesh Cricket Board banned him for eight years after he was found guilty of match fixing. The ban was later reduced to 5 years with 2 years suspended. At the end of the suspension, Ashraful returned to playing domestic cricket.

== Domestic and T20 franchise cricket career ==
=== Debut Season 2000–01 ===
Ashraful made his debut on 22 November 2000, playing for the Dhaka Metropolis cricket team. He opened the batting, scoring 41 and 6; Ashraful also claimed five wickets for 59 runs in the first innings with his leg-spin bowling. Three days later Ashraful made his list A debut, again playing for Dhaka Metropolis. Opening the batting, he scored 22 and took two wickets as his team won the match. Ashraful scored his maiden first-class century in his second match, making 101 against the Khulna cricket team. The seven wickets Ashraful took for 99 runs in a match against Chittagong Division in January 2001 remain his best bowling figures. Over the course of the 2000–01 season, he played ten first-class matches – scoring 585 runs at an average of 30.78, including two centuries, and taking 39 wickets at an average of 25.48, including three five-wicket hauls. He also played nine list A matches, scoring 85 runs and taking four wickets.

In November 2006, he set a league record score of 263, against Chittagong Division for Bangladeshi first-class cricket – although this record has since been broken by Raqibul Hasan.

Sonargaon Cricketers, a team in the Dhaka Premier League for the 2005–06 season, signed Ashraful and Mohammad Rafique. The team lost four of its first five games and sought a change of leadership in an attempt to improve its results. He later played for Rainhill CC in a local cricket league in England.

=== 2008–09 Season ===
On 6 February 2009, Ashraful took part in the player auction for the 2009 Indian Premier League. The Mumbai Indians bought him for his base price of US$75,000, but he only played one game and scored just 2 runs.

=== 2011–12 Season ===
He returned to domestic cricket in 2011, scoring a century for Dhaka Division in the opening match of the National Cricket League. Dhaka won the one-day competition, and Ashraful, who was the second-highest run-getter with 331 runs, also claimed 7 wickets in 7 matches, and was named player of the tournament.

For the 2011–12 season, the National Cricket League of Bangladesh was expanded from six first-class teams to eight. Dhaka Metropolis and Rangpur Division were the new teams, with Ashraful captaining the former. Although he scored his first first-class century in over a year during the competition, Ashraful was dropped from the ODI squad to face Pakistan in December.

During a match in the Dhaka Premier Division Cricket League in January 2012, Ashraful was involved in an incident with Tamim Iqbal. This led to the latter being banned for one match and fined.

=== 2017–18 Season ===
He was the leading run-scorer for Kala Bagan Krira Chakra in the 2017–18 Dhaka Premier Division Cricket League, with 665 runs in 13 matches. He was scheduled to play for Minister Group Rajshahi in Bangabandhu T20 cup.

=== Bangladesh Premier League ===
==== Dhaka Gladiators ====
The Bangladesh Cricket Board founded the six-team Bangladesh Premier League in 2012, a twenty20 tournament that was to be held in February of that year. The BCB made Ashraful the 'icon player' for the Dhaka Gladiators. Dhaka won the tournament, and in twelve matches Ashraful scored a total of 258 runs, with an average of 28.66, making him the BPL's second highest run-scorer amongst Bangladeshi batsmen.

During the 2013 Bangladesh Premier League, Ashraful scored 358 runs in 14 matches, with an average of 29.83 per match. He also scored a century (103* off 58) against the Khulna Royal Bengals.

== International career ==
=== Debut ===
Ashraful made his ODI debut against Zimbabwe on 11 April 2001, where he scored only 9 runs and Bangladesh lost the match by 36 runs. He took his first international wicket in the match, that of Andy Flower.

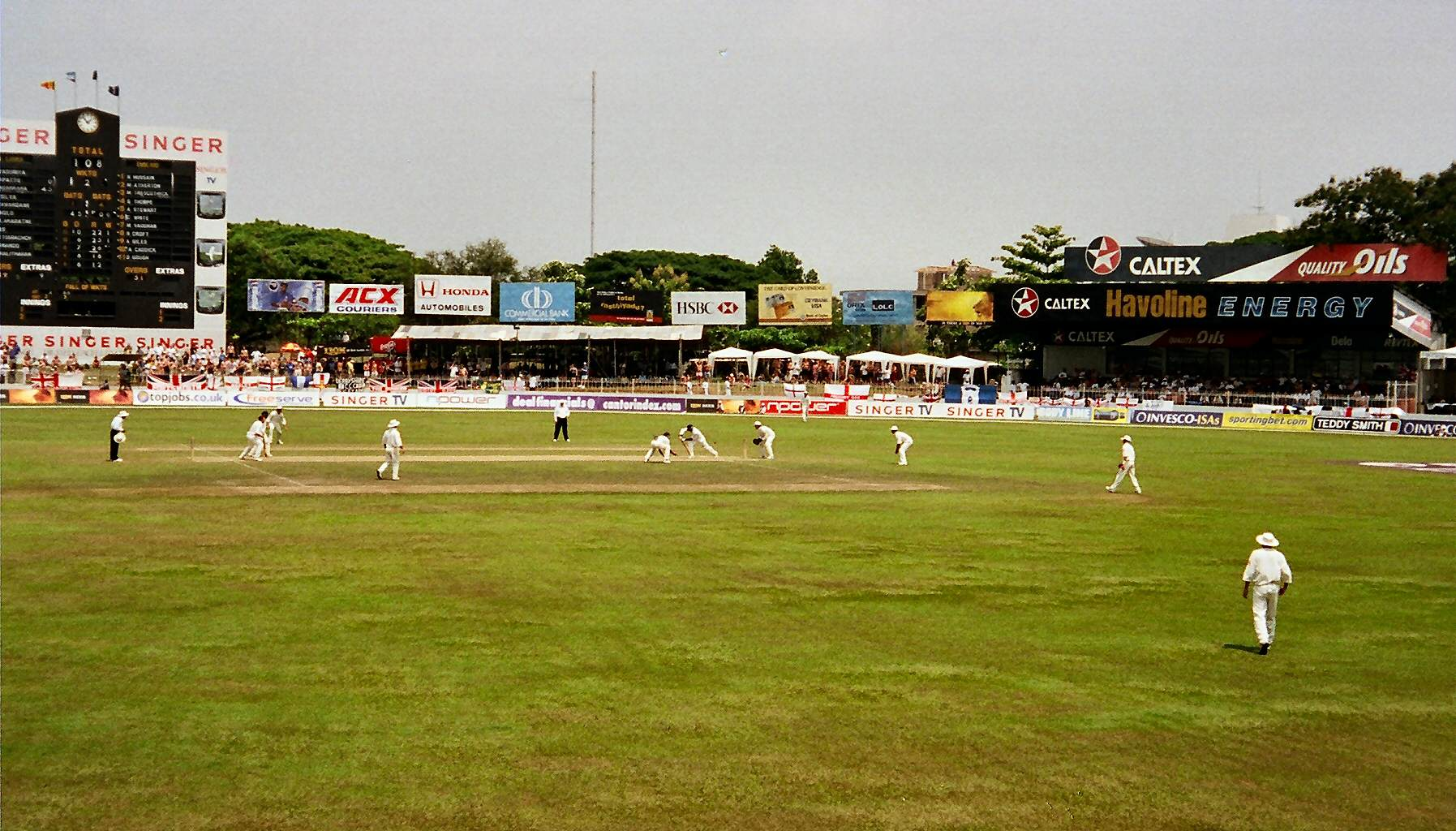
Sinhalese Sports Club Ground, where Ashraful made his Test debut on 6 September 2001 and became the youngest player to score a century in Test cricket.

Ashraful made his Test debut on 6 September 2001 against Sri Lanka. He scored highest in each inning, and although Bangladesh slumped to an innings defeat, Ashraful scored 114, becoming the youngest player to score a Test century, breaking Mushtaq Mohammad's record. As a result, he was named man of the match. (Note: There has been some uncertainty regarding his birth date – some sources claim it is 7 July, but others, as well as his passport, record it as 9 September; although either date would qualify him for his world record status (previously held by Pakistani Mushtaq Mohammad, aged 17 years 82 days in 1960–1).) He was the second Bangladeshi player to score a Test century on debut after Aminul Islam Bulbul in 2000 during Bangladesh's first Test match. Trevor Chappell, a former coach of Bangladesh's national side, commented that: "his determination, commitment and attention to detail would put a mature and an established person to shame. The manner he concentrates on his batting made me believe that the lad is destined to have a long cricketing journey." Following Ashraful's debut century, however, a prolonged string of poor performances resulted in him being dropped from the national team.

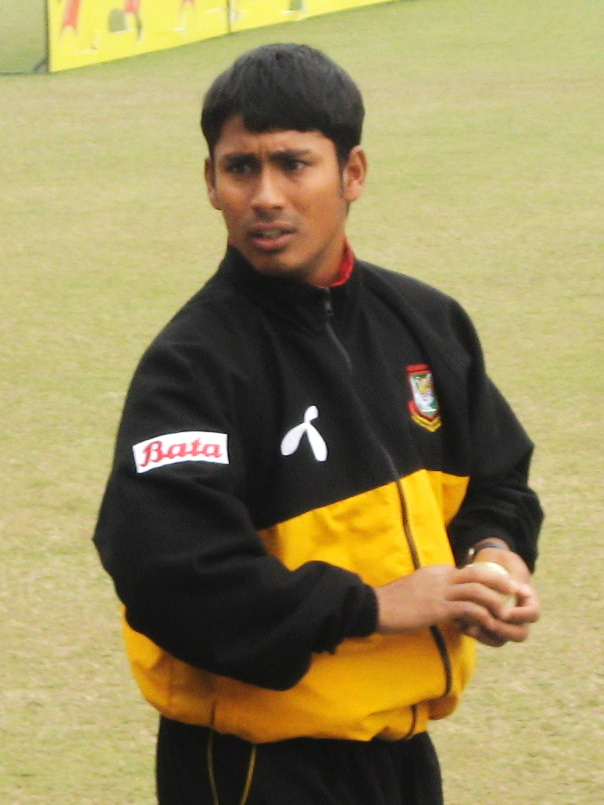
Ashraful training in 2009

=== 2003 – 2005. Patchy form ===
Ashraful performed poorly in his first World Cup, the 2003 Cricket World Cup, scoring 71 runs at an average of 14.20, with Bangladesh being eliminated during the group stage.

In February and March 2004, Bangladesh toured Zimbabwe. At the time, Zimbabwe was without many of their senior players, but the home team still won the Test series 1–0 and the ODI series 2–1. The solitary ODI victory was Bangladesh's first international win since defeating Pakistan in the 1999 World Cup; Ashraful scored 51 runs from 32 balls in the match and was named man of the match. Ashraful played with his team against India in December 2004 and scored his second century, 158 not out, claiming the record for the highest individual Test score by a Bangladeshi. India's team captain, Sourav Ganguly, described the innings as one of the best Test innings he had seen.

In May and June 2005, Bangladesh toured England for a two-Test series against the hosts and a triangular ODI tournament with England and Australia. Although they won just one ODI out of six, their solitary victory against Australia was described by Wisden as "the biggest upset in one-day international history". Ashraful scored 100, which rendered his team victorious, and was named Man of the Match. He scored two more half-centuries in the series, finishing with 259 runs at an average of 43.16, making him third-highest run scorer in the series.

=== 2006 – 2007. Patchy form continues ===
In 2006 he scored his third century, with 136 runs during the first test against Sri Lanka. Ashraful was selected for the Asian squad in the inaugural Afro-Asia Cup. With bowler Mashrafe Mortaza, he was one of two Bangladeshi players in the 15-man squad. Ashraful played in two of the matches, but failed to score a run.

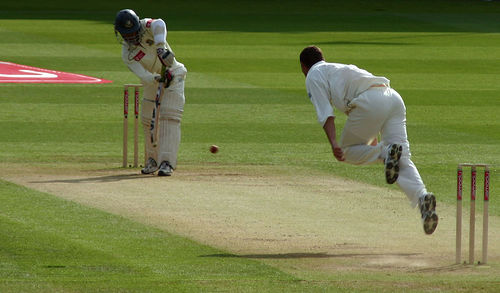
Ashraful batting

The opening match of the two-Test series against Sri Lanka in February and March 2006 was played at the Zahur Ahmed Chowdhury Stadium, the first international match hosted at that stadium. He scored 136 runs in the first innings, his third Test century; he received the man of the match award, although Sri Lanka won by eight wickets. Bangladesh lost the second Test by ten wickets, with Ashraful managing 37 runs in the match and claiming the wicket of Mahela Jayawardene. Sri Lanka eventually won the series 2–0.

The West Indies hosted the 2007 Cricket World Cup in March and April; Ashraful was included in the 15-man squad led by Habibul Bashar. Bangladesh made it to the second stage of the competition and finished seventh place. Along the way, the team tried to knock India out of the tournament. Ashraful scored 87 runs from 83 balls against South Africa in the course of Bangladesh's 67-run victory. His innings was the highest score by a Bangladeshi player in the World Cup and he was named man of the match for his performance. With 216 runs from 9 matches at an average of 36, Ashraful was Bangladesh's highest run-scorer in the tournament.

=== Captaincy (2007–2009) ===
Ashraful's record as captain
	Matches	Won	Lost	Drawn
Test	13	0	12	1
ODI	38	8	30	–
T20I	11	2	9	–

Shortly after the World Cup, India toured Bangladesh for two Test matches and three ODIs. During the second Test, which Bangladesh lost by multiple innings and 239 runs, Ashraful scored the fastest half-century in Test cricket history in terms of time (taking 27 minutes), which was also the second-fastest in terms of balls faced (scored off 26 balls). Aside from the 67 innings he scored in one of the fastest half-centuries in Test cricket history, Ashraful managed only five more runs in the series; in two ODIs, he scored 41 runs. After defeats in both series, Habibul Bashar stepped down as Bangladesh's captain; Mohammad Ashraful was appointed the team captain on 2 June 2007. At the time, he had played 35 Tests and 101 ODIs and had some experience with captaincy at the domestic level. Aged 22, he was the second-youngest international captain at the time.

Ashraful and Mortaza took on these roles from the start of the Sri Lanka tour in June 2007. Coach Dav Whatmore had declined to extend his contract and Shaun Williams took over as coach on a temporary basis. Bangladesh lost all three Tests in terms of innings. In the second Test, they registered their lowest score in innings (62). Ashraful scored the most runs (218) for Bangladesh at an average of 43. In the second Test, Ashraful and wicketkeeper Mushfiqur Rahim scored 191 combined for the sixth wicket, and Ashraful scored 129 "not out". Bangladesh also lost the three-match ODI series that followed 3–0. In September 2007, South Africa hosted the ICC World Twenty20. Victory against the West Indies in the first round was enough to ensure Bangladesh's progression to the second round, although they failed to win any of the other matches. In the match against the West Indies, Ashraful scored a record-breaking half-century, with 20 ball deliveries. At the time, it was the fastest T20I half-century in terms of balls faced. He held the record for six days before it was broken by Yuvraj Singh in a match against England.

During the first Test match of South Africa's 2007–08 tour, Ashraful dismissed AB de Villiers in an unusual fashion: after the ball left his hand it bounced twice, at which point de Villiers attempted to hit the ball but instead sent it straight up. Ashraful caught the ball and, despite de Villiers standing his ground, umpire Steve Bucknor confirmed the dismissal. The dismissal was legal per Section 6 of Law 24 of the Laws of Cricket, which states the ball must bounce more than twice or roll along the ground to be deemed a no-ball.

After an extended run of poor form and Bangladesh's first-round exit in the 2009 World Twenty20, Ashraful was dismissed as captain in June 2009. He was replaced by Mashrafe Mortaza for the tour of the West Indies, with Shakib Al Hasan as vice-captain. It was hoped that Ashraful could improve his performance in the international game following his dismissal as captain.

Ashraful later captained Bangladesh's team again at the 2010 Asian Games in late November. They played Afghanistan in the final; Bangladesh won by five wickets, securing the country's first gold medal at the Asian Games.

=== Post-captaincy (2009–present) ===
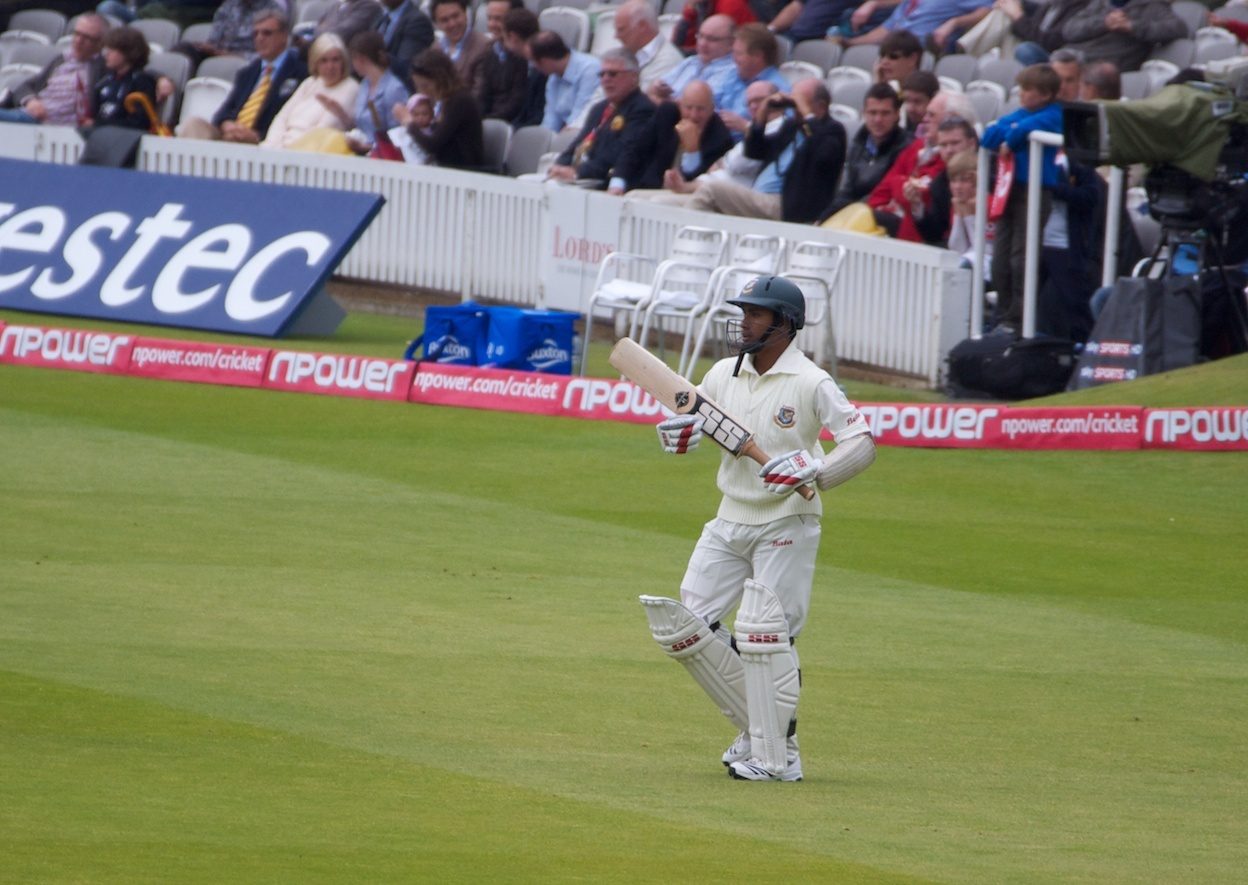
Mohammad Ashraful walking in to bat at Lords in a Test match against England in 2010. He scored 50 runs in the two-Test series.

Ashraful was dropped when England toured Bangladesh in February and March 2010. He was recalled for Bangladesh's tour of England two months later. He struggled in June's 2010 Asia Cup, and was subsequently dropped; he was recalled for the ODI leg of the England tour due to injuries to the squad. After a poor run of form, Ashraful was dropped from the ODI series against New Zealand in October 2010. Though he was out of the squad, the following month when the BCB announced its central contracts for the coming year Ashraful was one of six players given the highest level of contract (A+).

The West Indies toured Bangladesh in October, but after scoring just two runs, Ashraful was dropped from the Test squad.

Shortly after winning the Asian Games in 2010, Ashraful was recalled to Bangladesh's full squad for the five-match ODI series against Zimbabwe in December. Though they lost the first match, Bangladesh went on to win the next three, with one called off due to rain, and defeated Zimbabwe 3–1. Ashraful played one match, scoring six runs.

He was included in Bangladesh's 15-man squad for the 2011 Cricket World Cup, co-hosted by Bangladesh along with India and Sri Lanka. In three matches, Ashraful scored only 18 runs and was dropped from the squad for the three-match ODI series against Australia that followed.

=== In and out of the team ===
In April he captained Bangladesh A on a tour of South Africa and his performance, including striking a one-day century, earned him a recall to the senior squad to face Zimbabwe in August. In the one-off Test, Ashraful scored the most runs for his team with a total of 112, including a half-century, even though Bangladesh was defeated. Bangladesh lost the following ODI series against Zimbabwe 3–2. Bangladesh's batsmen struggled early in the series, and Ashraful scored 23 runs during three matches.

He was retained for the Test side for the Pakistan series in 2012, but was dropped after the first Test, in which he scored only one run. When the BCB announced its central contracts for 2012, Ashraful's A+ contract was not renewed.

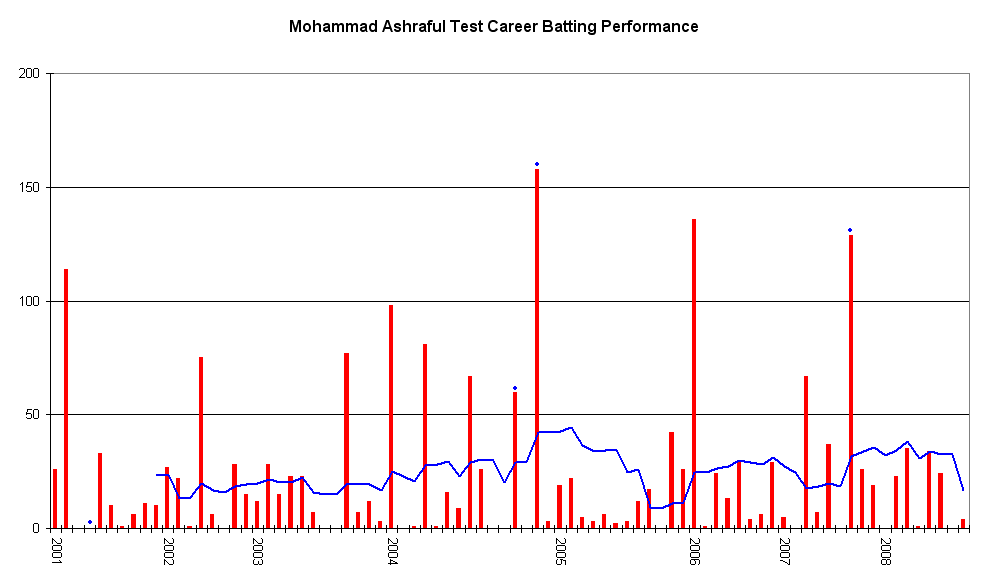
An innings-by-innings breakdown of Ashraful's Test match batting career up to March 2008, showing runs scored (red bars) and the average of the last ten innings (blue line).

In October 2018, he was named in the squad for the Chittagong Vikings team, following the draft for the 2018–19 Bangladesh Premier League.

== International centuries ==
Test centuries by Mohammad Ashraful
No.	Runs	Against	Venue	H/A	Date	Result	Ref
1	114	Sri Lanka	Singhalese Sports Club, Colombo	Away	6 September 2001	Lost	
2	158 not out	India	M. A. Aziz Stadium, Chittagong	Home	17 December 2004	Lost	
3	136	Sri Lanka	Zohur Ahmed Chowdhury Stadium, Chittagong	Home	28 February 2006	Lost	
4	129 not out	Sri Lanka	Paikiasothy Saravanamuttu Stadium, Colombo	Away	3 July 2007	Lost	
5	101	Sri Lanka	Sher-e-Bangla National Cricket Stadium, Dhaka	Home	26 December 2008	Lost	
6	190	Sri Lanka	Galle International Stadium, Galle	Away	8 March 2013	Drawn	

One Day International centuries by Mohammad Ashraful
No.	Runs	Against	Venue	H/A/N	Date	Result	Ref
1	100	Australia	Sophia Gardens, Cardiff	Neutral	18 June 2005	Won	
2	109	United Arab Emirates	Gaddafi Stadium, Lahore	Neutral	24 June 2008	Won	
3	103 not out	Zimbabwe	Queens Sports Club, Bulawayo	Away	9 August 2009	Won	

== Controversies ==
In March 2008, Ashraful slapped a fan who called him "rubbish" while he was training at an indoor stadium in Dhaka. This took place at a time when Ashraful was being heavily criticised in the media for his poor performance and questionable tactics on the field as captain. The BCB fined him 25% of his salary for the month of March 2008 for violating the Code of Conduct. He later apologised for the incident.

=== Spot-fixing controversy ===
Mohammad Ashraful admitted to spot-fixing during the 2013 Bangladesh Premier League. The Bangladesh Cricket Board suspended him from the game temporarily until the ICC's Anti-Corruption and Security Unit submitted its report on its investigations into the fixing. The alleged fixing involved a match between the Dhaka Gladiators and the Chittagong Vikings during the second edition of the BPL on 2 February 2013. The then-28-year-old Ashraful was allegedly paid about $12,800 to lose the match, but the cheque he was given later bounced, according to the local media. He was also allegedly involved in fixing another match 10 days later, against the Barisal Burners, which his team lost by seven wickets. In June 2014, the Bangladesh Cricket Board found him responsible and banned him for eight years, which was later reduced to five years (with two years suspended).

In August 2016, Ashraful's ban was partially lifted, allowing him to play in domestic cricket in Bangladesh. He became eligible to play in international fixtures in 2018. In 2022, Ashraful played for Lullington Park Cricket Club in the Derbyshire County Cricket League. In 2024 he signed for Portsmouth Cricket Club, guiding them to promotion in his first season, before re-signing for a second season in 2025.

== Notes ==
Preceded by Habibul Bashar	Bangladesh national cricket captain 2007–2009	Succeeded by Mashrafe Mortaza
