= Khaled Mashud =

Bangladeshi cricketer

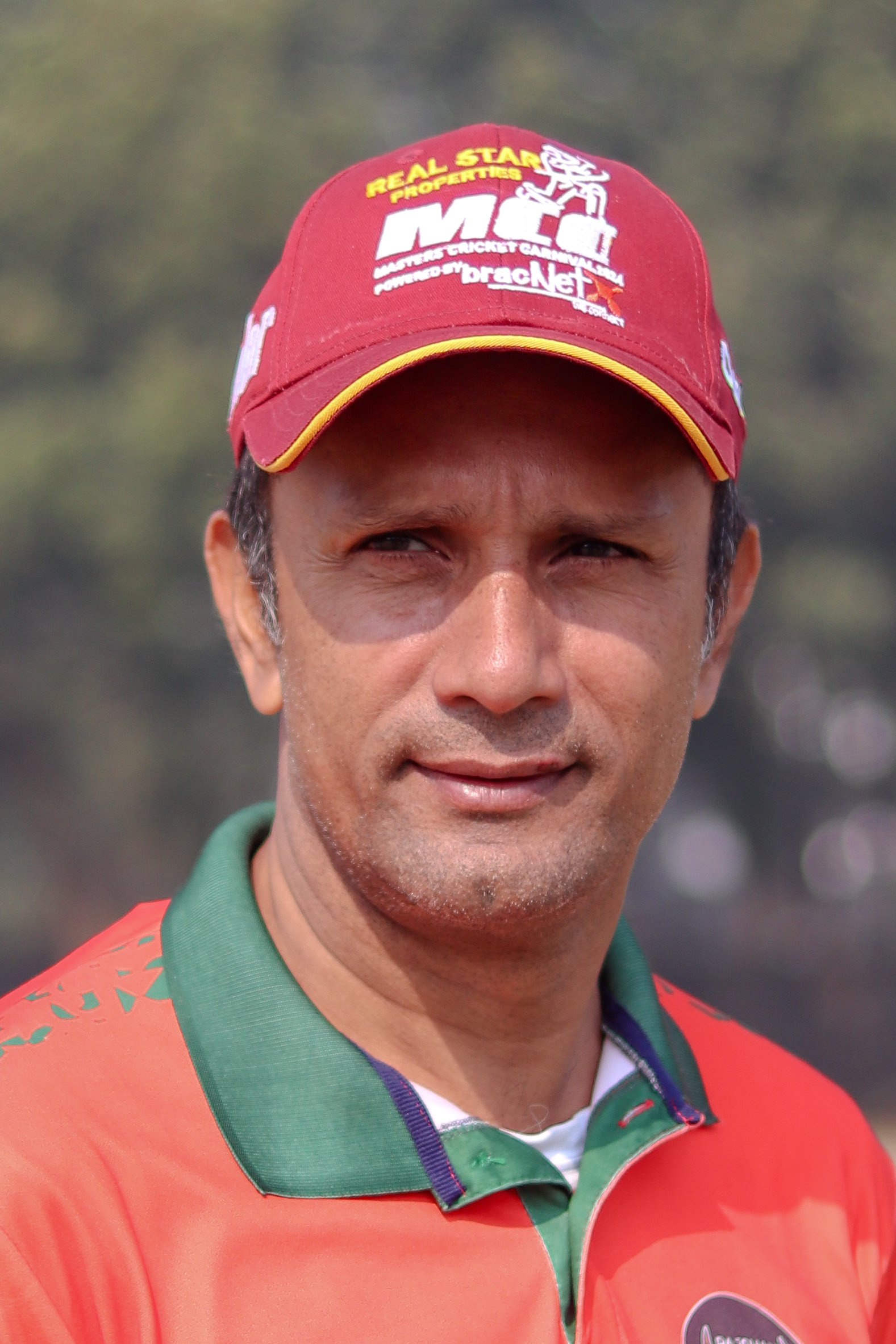
- Pilot in 2024

Personal information
- Full name: Khaled Mashud
- Born: 8 February 1976 (age 50); Rajshahi, Bangladesh
- Nickname: Pilot
- Batting: Right-handed
- Role: Wicket-keeper

International information
- National side: Bangladesh (1995–2007)
- Test debut (cap 6): 10 November 2000 v India
- Last Test: 25 June 2007 v Sri Lanka
- ODI debut (cap 26): 5 April 1995 v India
- Last ODI: 5 December 2006 v Zimbabwe
- ODI shirt no.: 10

Domestic team information
- Years: Team
- 1997–2011: Rajshahi Division

Career statistics
Competition	Test	ODI	FC	LA
Matches	44	126	101	184
Runs scored	1,409	1,818	3,933	2,578
Batting average	19.04	21.90	24.89	20.46
100s/50s	1/3	0/7	3/18	0/10
Top score	103*	71*	201*	71*
Balls bowled	0	0	50	7
Wickets	–	–	0	0
Bowling average	–	–	–	–
5 wickets in innings	–	–	–	–
10 wickets in match	–	–	–	–
Best bowling	–	–	–	–
Catches/stumpings	78/9	91/35	174/18	147/49
- Source: Cricinfo, 21 November 2008

Khaled Mashud, popularly known as Khaled Mashud Pilot (Bengali: খালেদ মাসুদ; born 8 February 1976) is a former Bangladeshi cricketer who was the country's Test and ODI captain. A wicketkeeper and middle-order batsman, he was a regular member of the national team between 1995 and 2007. Bangladeshi coach Dav Whatmore called Mashud the "best wicketkeeper in Asia." He contributed to Bangladesh's first ever ODI hat-trick by taking two catches off Shahadat Hossain's bowling. After his international retirement in 2008, he continued to play domestic cricket in Bangladesh as captain of the Rajshahi Division team. Mashud announced his retirement from domestic cricket after captaining his team to win the title in 2011. In 2025 he was elected as a director of Bangladesh Cricket Board.

== Personal life ==
His father Shamsu was a prominent Bangladeshi footballer in the 1970s. A striker, he formed a partnership with Kazi Salahuddin and helped Abahani Krira Chakra win the Dhaka First Division League title in 1977.

== Early days ==
Mashud played for the Bangladesh U-19 side in 1993. Apart from his keeping duties, he also took the important responsibility of batting at No. 3. Within couple of years, he graduated to the national team and played against the touring England 'A' team in February 1995. His ODI debut came later in the year at Sharjah.

== International career ==
=== In Test cricket ===
He made an impressive Test debut with the bat, scoring 32 and 21* runs in the historic match against India in November 2000. But his most memorable moment in Test cricket came in the West Indies in May 2004. Despite taking a first innings lead of 64 runs, Bangladesh ran into trouble, losing their first seven wickets for just 123 runs. Mashud then led a late order recovery to take the score to 271/9 (decl.). The declaration came just after Mashud completed his hundred (103*). He was given excellent support by Rafiq (29) and Tapash (26). Behind the stumps, his 87 dismissals from 44 matches does not sound very impressive, but he was playing for a side which possessed very little venom in their bowling department.

=== One Day Internationals ===
Mashud was a vital member of the triumphant Bangladesh team in the 1997 ICC trophy. There, he topped the batting averages for his country, scoring 92 runs and getting out only once. He was the Man of the Match against Scotland after scoring 70 runs and sharing a 115 run partnership with Aminul Islam. In the final, he scored a quickfire 15* from just 7 deliveries to take Bangladesh home to a last ball victory. His innings included two massive hits for six. He also enjoyed a highly successful time behind the stumps with 12 catches and 11 stumpings.

Mashud had little chance to show his mettle as a one-day batsman, as he almost inevitably came to bat with his team struggling. Still, he managed to get a top score of 71* runs, against the Australians in 2005. With the Bangladesh spinners being more effective in limited-over games, Mashud had more chance to show his class. His 91 catches and 35 stumpings in ODI testify to that.

Mashud had a brief stint as captain of Bangladesh. But, he lost his captaincy in acrimonious circumstances following the 2003 World Cup in Africa. Bangladesh suffered defeats at the hands of Canada and Kenya amidst allegations of match fixing. Although the allegations were not proved Mashud was stripped of his captaincy duty. In February 2006, he was fined after being found guilty of bringing the game into disrepute during a match against Sri Lanka.

His place in the side came under threat, however, with the emergence of Mushfiqur Rahim, combined with his own failure to score a half century in 24 Test innings. He was subsequently dropped from the Bangladesh squad for the 2007 Cricket World Cup and after a brief return against Sri Lanka did not feature, with Rahim and Dhiman Ghosh being preferred as wicketkeepers. He announced his retirement from international cricket in 2008.

== Later career ==
Early in 2019, Mashud was chosen as the new Bangladesh team manager for the away series against New Zealand.

Preceded by Naimur Rahman	Bangladesh national cricket captain 2001/2	Succeeded by Khaled Mahmud
Preceded by Habibul Bashar	Bangladesh national cricket captain 2004/5	Succeeded by Habibul Bashar
