= Syed Rasel =

Bangladeshi cricketer (born 1984)

Personal information
- Born: 3 July 1984 (age 42); Jessore, Bangladesh
- Height: 6 ft 4 in (1.93 m)
- Batting: Left-handed
- Bowling: Left-arm medium-fast

International information
- National side: Bangladesh (2005–2010)
- Test debut (cap 44): 12 September 2005 v Sri Lanka
- Last Test: 11 July 2007 v Sri Lanka
- ODI debut (cap 78): 31 August 2005 v Sri Lanka
- Last ODI: 15 July 2010 v Ireland
- ODI shirt no.: 47
- T20I debut (cap 16): 1 September 2007 v Kenya
- Last T20I: 5 November 2008 v South Africa

Domestic team information
- Years: Team
- 2001–2011, 2014–2015: Khulna Division
- 2011–2012: Barisal Division
- 2012: Duronto Rajshahi

Career statistics
Competition	Test	ODI	T20I
Matches	6	52	8
Runs scored	37	81	7
Batting average	4.62	5.06	3.50
100s/50s	0/0	0/0	0/0
Top score	19	15	6
Balls bowled	879	2,657	174
Wickets	12	61	4
Bowling average	47.75	33.62	50.50
5 wickets in innings	0	0	0
10 wickets in match	0	0	0
Best bowling	4/129	4/22	1/10
Catches/stumpings	0/–	8/–	1/–
- Source: ESPNcricinfo, 29 October 2017

Syed Rasel (Bengali: সৈয়দ রাসেল; born 3 July 1984) is a Bangladeshi former cricketer who represented his country in all formats of the game. He was a left-handed medium-fast swing bowler who came up through the ranks of the under-19s, to the Bangladesh A team, to the full Bangladesh team, while playing domestically for Khulna Division.

Playing for Bangladesh A against Kent in August 2005, a 21-year-old Rasel took bowling figures of 7 for 50 in the first innings and finished the match with ten wickets.

== International career ==
He was rewarded with a spot in the Bangladeshi squad for the tour of Sri Lanka the following month. He went on to make both his Test and ODI debuts on the tour, taking 4 for 129 in the second Test at Colombo.

Back home at Bogra in February 2006, Rasel took 2 for 28 to give Bangladesh their first ever ODI win over Sri Lanka.

Rasel's progress was halted when he damaged his foot in a motorbike accident, but he recovered in time to take part in the 2006 Champions Trophy.

Despite not playing all but one game of their last ODI series before the 2007 Cricket World Cup, he made the squad for the Caribbean. In the 3rd Test against Sri Lanka during the 2007 season, he became the 700th Test victim of Muttiah Muralitharan.

At the start of November 2010, the BCB announced 16 central contracts. Rasel was one of six players in the third tier (grade B). When the central contracts were next renewed, in April 2012, Rasel's contract was allowed to lapse.

In 2011, he signed for Halstead Cricket Club to play in the East Anglian Premier Cricket League.
