= List of Biman Bangladesh Airlines cricketers =

This is presenting a complete list in alphabetical order of the twenty cricketers who played for Biman Bangladesh Airlines in first-class or List A matches during the 2000–01 season, the only one in which the team was functioning at the highest level of Bangladeshi cricket.

== A ==
- Aamer Wasim (Pakistan)
- Aminul Islam
- Anwar Hossain Monir
- Atiar Rahman

== F ==
- Faruk Ahmed

== H ==
- Habibul Bashar
- Hasanuzzaman
- Humayun Rashid

== I ==
- Imran Farhat (Pakistan)

== J ==
- Jahangir Alam Talukdar
- Javed Omar

== M ==
- Manzoor Akhtar (Pakistan)
- Mohammad Sharif
- Mukhtar Siddique

== R ==
- Rafiqul Islam

== S ==
- Saifullah Khan
- Saleh Ahmed
- Sanwar Hossain
- Shariful Haque

== Z ==
- Ziaur Rashid
