= Test matches in England in 2005 =

There were seven Test matches played in England in 2005. The first two were against Bangladesh, the bottom-ranked test team. England started this series ranked second in the LG ICC Test Championship table.

The remaining tests were played for the Ashes against Australia, the top-ranked team in the world. The series is widely regarded as one of the best ever played.

== England v Bangladesh ==
=== First Test: England v Bangladesh (26–28 May) ===
Bangladesh
108
&
159
England won by an innings and 261 runs

Javed Omar 22
MJ Hoggard 4–42

Khaled Mashud 44
SP Jones 3–29

Lord's, London
Umpires: K Hariharan (Ind) and DJ Harper (Aus)
Man of the Match: ME Trescothick (Eng)

England
528/3d

ME Trescothick 194
MP Vaughan 120
Mashrafe Mortaza 2–107

Michael Vaughan won the toss and put Bangladesh in to bat at 10.30am on the first day at Lord's. The first ten overs of bowling by Steve Harmison and Matthew Hoggard were lacklustre, as neither mastered the early-morning swing and they bowled a wide line. A stronger side would have scored more runs in this period, by Bangladesh made only 31 before losing their first wicket. Bangladesh captain, Habibul Bashar then came and went with suicidal hoick when he was on three. The rest of the team succumbed quickly, often to bad balls as they failed to adjust to the English conditions. The English mixed the odd good length ball with the short and wide stuff, inducing edges through to the slips at regular intervals – although, admittedly, the Bangladeshis would never have been out if they'd tried to play a bit more defensively.

Javed Omar was the pick of the batsmen, scoring 22 before being caught by Marcus Trescothick off the most accurate of the English bowlers, Simon Jones. With six batsmen out in single figures, only Aftab Ahmed looked in control, before he also edged Andrew Flintoff to slip. In the end, Bangladesh made just 108 in 38.2 overs, despite being boosted by 12 English no-balls – eight from Hoggard, four from Harmison. Few batsmen even displayed the standard practice of getting behind a swinging ball and playing with a straight bat, preferring instead to stay still and nudge at the ball.

Marcus Trescothick and Andrew Strauss then batted to tea with composure, taking the boundaries off Test debutant Shahadat Hossain in particular, and the pair made 70 runs before tea – meaning that England were only 38 off with ten wickets in hand after two sessions. An hour after tea, England brought up the lead, with Strauss having notched his fifty despite looking slightly shaky against Anwar Hossain Monir bowling, and then being dropped on 51. Trescothick then made his fifty with a four off Mohammad Rafique. The opening partnership eventually was worth 148, as Strauss was nearly lbw on 69 with an inswinging ball on one ball and then finally lbw on the next, Mashrafe Mortaza getting rewards for his patient bowling.

England, however, continued to paste the bowlers, although skipper Michael Vaughan was lucky on more than one occasion – the most notable when he was dropped by Mohammad Rafique off Rafique's own bowling. By stumps, however, the pair had added 40, and they continued on a sunny second day – less rusty, however, than they had been on the first day. It was all too embarrassing for Bangladesh, as Vaughan raced to 120 before being caught behind off Mashrafe. Four overs later, the patient Rafique finally got his reward, Khaled Mashud coming up with a magnificent catch to get Trescothick out six short of a double century. That was as good as it got for Bangladesh, though, as Ian Bell, Warwickshire's prodigy, made 65 not out, and Graham Thorpe ran runs everywhere to score 42 not out with only two boundaries, before Vaughan decided that enough was enough and declared with seven wickets in hand and a lead of 420 runs.

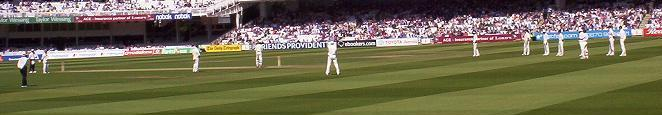
England set a very attacking field against Bangladesh on the third day. Only the bowler and silly point are in front of the stumps.

Bangladesh's reply was a sorry one. Yet again, they failed to play the short ball well enough, and lost five wickets – Simon Jones and Andrew Flintoff the main culprits, taking two each – for a miserable 65 before Khaled Mashud and Aftab Ahmed took some responsibility and guided them to stumps with 95 for 5. It was not to last, though. Only six balls into the third day, Hoggard bowled a good off-cutter to Aftab Ahmed, who failed to play it properly and was hit on the pads – out for a fine 32, Bangladesh's highest score in the Test series so far.

Steve Harmison then bowled the next over from the Pavilion End, removing spinner Rafique for a duck on his second ball of the over as he was caught behind and then having Mortaza bowled as Mortaza missed the ball only to have it graze his pad and roll behind him to hit his leg stump. Bangladesh had lost three wickets for two runs in the space of nine balls, and Harmison nearly added another wicket to his tally as he hit Anwar Hossain Monir on the pad in front. However, umpire Hariharan wasn't convinced it was going to hit the stumps, and Harmison was denied the hat-trick.

The end looked to be even more abrupt than people could think before the third day had started. However, a no-ball-aided recovery and some fine batting from wicket-keeper Khaled Mashud, who surpassed Aftab Ahmed's score, sent the match into a slow-death period. Anwar Hossain and Khaled Mashud did, however, manage to put on 58 together for the ninth wicket, Bangladesh's best partnership of the match. Simon Jones eventually broke through the defences, though, as Anwar Hossain Monir got a standard thick edge to first slip Trescothick, and thus the ninth wicket fell – 156 for 9. An over later, Khaled Mashud was finally out, giving an awkward edge off Andrew Flintoff's bowling to Graham Thorpe at short leg and ending the innings on 159 all out – giving England an innings and 261 run win just before noon, half an hour before lunch, on the third day. Gareth Batty – England's spin-bowler, who came in to replace the injured Ashley Giles – was only mentioned on the official scorecard once, as he did not bat, did not bowl, and did not hold a catch. Trescothick was named man of the match for his 194. (Cricinfo scorecard)

=== Second Test: England v Bangladesh (3–5 June) ===
Bangladesh
104
&
326
England won by an innings and 27 runs

Javed Omar 37
SJ Harmison 5/38

Aftab Ahmed 82*
Javed Omar 71
Habibul Bashar 63

MJ Hoggard 5/73

Riverside, Chester-le-Street
Umpires: DJ Harper (Aus) and AL Hill (NZ)
Man of the Match: MJ Hoggard (Eng)
Men of the Series: ME Trescothick (Eng) and Javed Omar (Ban)

England
447/3d

ME Trescothick 151
IR Bell 162*
GP Thorpe 66*
Mashrafe Mortaza 2/91

Michael Vaughan won the toss again, just like in the first Test, and put Bangladesh into bat. A thoroughly professional bowling performance from the England bowlers followed, with Harmison, playing at his home ground, making the most of the conditions to take 5 wickets as the clearly outclassed Bangladeshis succumbed for 104. Only Javed Omar and Khaled Mashud made it into double figures. In reply, England quickly overcame the deficit for the loss of just Andrew Strauss, the only English batter who averaged less than 80 in this Test series. By close on the first day England were 269 for 3, with pundits reckoning the game would not reach the third day.

On the second day, Ian Bell became the first Englishman to score 100 before lunch in a Test match for 70 years, the last one being Les Ames, as both Bell and Thorpe hit out ahead of the predicted lunchtime declaration, which happened with England on 447 for 3. What followed was what the series had been crying out for earlier: a spirited Bangladeshi performance with proper cricketing shots. Whilst some Bangladeshis did get out to wild shots, the senior players got behind the ball, selected which ball to play, and made the most of the aggressive field placings chosen by England to make partnerships and build innings.

First out was Nafees Iqbal, caught behind for 15 with the score on 50. Iqbal was unlucky, as the video replays suggested the ball had bounced before going into Geraint Jones's gloves, but despite returning to the pitch to appeal to the umpires, Iqbal had to go. Opener Javed Omar, captain Habibul Bashar and Aftab Ahmed all made half-centuries as it was touch and go as to whether England would wrap it up in the two days. When the seventh wicket fell at 245 in the last over of normal play, it allowed England to claim the extra half-hour. But only one more wicket fell as Bangladesh restored some pride. England wrapped up the game within 20 minutes on the third day, but Bangladesh, albeit against an attacking field had made 316, 27 short of making the hosts bat again.

England therefore won the two Test series 2–0, taking both matches by more than an innings. This was their fifth successive Test series win, and the first time that the English had won five successive Test series since 1971. With their first three innings all being over before the Bangladeshis made 200, the series was clearly England's, who consolidated their position at second in the ICC Test Championship table. Bangladesh remain bottom in tenth place. Afterwards England captain Michael Vaughan said, "It's difficult to judge how much we've got out of these games because we've won so easily. We've not had those real tough-in sessions and fight-through sessions where we've lost a batch of wickets. We have had stages when we had to knuckle down but it has been easier than I expected. To win two Test matches in almost two days each is obviously quite an easy series victory." (Cricinfo scorecard)

== England v Australia ==
=== First Test: England v Australia (21–24 July) ===
Australia
190
&
384
Australia won by 239 runs

JL Langer 40
SJ Harmison 5/43

MJ Clarke 91
SJ Harmison 3/54

Lord's, London, England
Umpires: Aleem Dar (Pak) and RE Koertzen (SA)
Man of the Match: GD McGrath (Aus)

England
155
&
180

KP Pietersen 57
GD McGrath 5/53

KP Pietersen 64*
GD McGrath 4/29

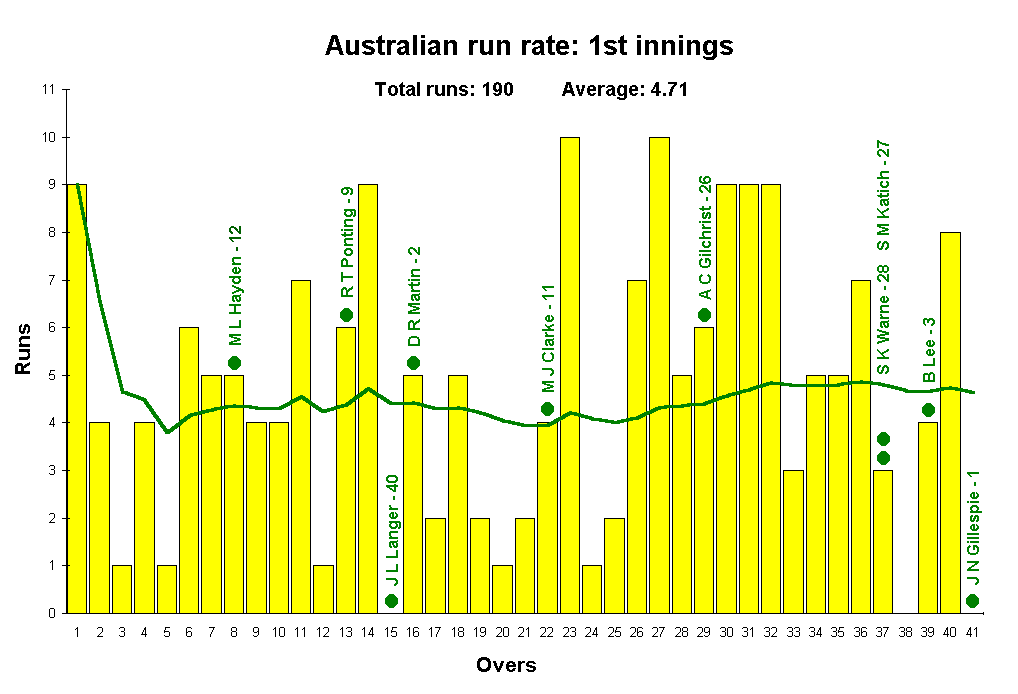
Australian run rate from the first innings.

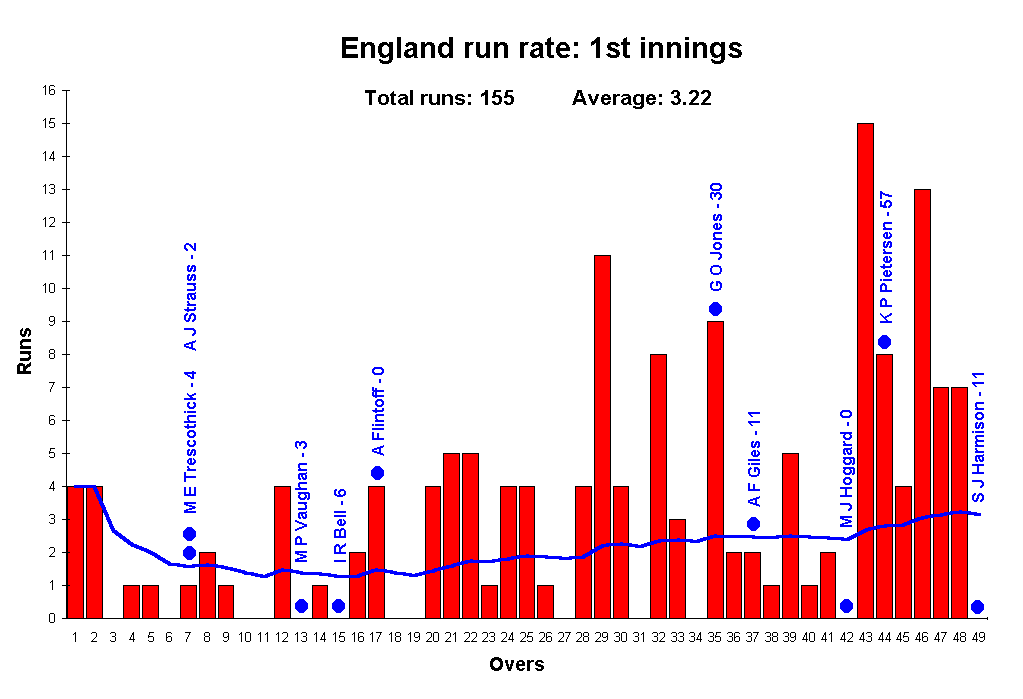
English run rate from the first innings.

==== Day One ====
A low-scoring first day of cricket at Lord's included two batting collapses, first from Australia and then from England who got their go at batting just before tea. Ricky Ponting won the toss and chose to bat, and after Steve Harmison had shaken up the opening batsmen early on, hitting Australia's batsmen with bouncers, in particular one that had Justin Langer on the elbow, a procession of wickets began. Matthew Hoggard was inaccurate, but the early swing under the cloud suited him, and the ball that he did get on line swung between bat and pad to smash into Matthew Hayden's off stump. Australia still scored quickly, helped by aggressive field placings from England, but Harmison got the reward for short and pacy bowling when Ricky Ponting edged him to Andrew Strauss at third slip for 9. Langer, who had looked immaculate all morning and taken on the bowlers, was next to depart, Michael Vaughan getting reward with his bowling changes as Andrew Flintoff lured Langer into an expansive pull to Harmison at square-leg. And when Simon Jones was brought on in the sixteenth over, he got an immediate reward, with Damien Martyn gone for 2. Another man came and went before lunch, Michael Clarke, and Australia were five down after the first session of play.

Adam Gilchrist, Simon Katich and Shane Warne all played a part in getting Australia past 100, with their scores in the 20s, but Harmison – coming back for a second spell – wrapped them up with variations in length along with his ever-reliant pace. He finished with five for 43, allowing Glenn McGrath to be stranded on 10 not out, and McGrath was to take centre stage when England batted. They survived six overs until tea, scoring ten runs, but McGrath, who bowled his usual accurate line and length and got the odd ball to move, reaped massive rewards. Marcus Trescothick fell first ball after tea, edging to slip, and Strauss fell in similar fashion three balls later. Michael Vaughan and Ian Bell were shaken up, but survived six overs – before McGrath started the torture again. They were both bowled, as was Andrew Flintoff, and England had lost five wickets for 21 runs, with five of their front line batsmen out in single figures. However, Kevin Pietersen and Geraint Jones gave England a glimmer of hope, pairing up for 58 before Brett Lee's reverse-swing with the old ball induced a backward edge off Jones' bat to Adam Gilchrist. Ashley Giles hit two quick boundaries, but a short pacy ball from Lee undid him, and England were 92 for 7 overnight – needing 98 for the last three wickets to get level with Australia.

==== Day Two ====
England's difficulties continued in the morning. Despite McGrath not getting nearly as much swing, Hoggard departed for an eight-ball duck, cutting a delivery from Shane Warne to Hayden in the slips. Throwing caution to the wind, Pietersen launched himself into his natural game, taking twenty-one runs off seven deliveries before finally being out caught by Damien Martyn, a splendid catch just metres off the ropes, as England looked to subside for 130. However, in yet another twist, Simon Jones and Harmison fought back with some streaky accumulation, pairing up for 33 – the fifth-highest partnership of the game thus far – to reduce Australia's lead to 35 runs. England also got a good start fielding, Pietersen having a flat throw at the stumps to run out Langer for 6, but Hayden and Ricky Ponting rebuilt well.

In fact, the entire top order apart from Langer batted to high scores, but Clarke needed an extra life to do it. Pietersen dropped him on 21, with the Australian score 139 for 3, and instead of England getting the vital breakthrough Clarke and Martyn ran away with it, hitting 155 in 34.3 overs. Flintoff was smashed to all corners, and his figures read for 84 runs in nineteen overs, but England fought back late in the day – in the frantic last ten overs, started by an inside-edge from Clarke off Hoggard, Australia lost four wickets for 24 runs. However, Australia had gained a lead of 314 runs by the end of the second day, and still had Katich there on 10.

==== Day Three ====
Four overs into the morning, Ashley Giles returned what could arguably be said to be his most useful contribution of the match, having Brett Lee run out for 8. However, the always defensive Jason Gillespie proved too difficult to get out for England, Harmison menacing him with bouncers and yorkers but not managing it, and it was the quietly toiling Jones who finally got his reward with an away-swinger that crashed into Gillespie's off-stump – after having a number of catches dropped, one especially simple one by namesake Geraint. Glenn McGrath and Katich continued with a partnership of 43, as England was set what would be a world record 420 to win.

They started positively, riding their luck and good favour with the umpires – a number of lbw appeals were turned down both before and after tea – as Strauss and Trescothick paired up for 80 for the first wicket before Strauss edged a classic pace-man's short-ball from Lee back into the bowler's waiting hands. Vaughan got nicely off the mark with a four with his second ball, however, suggesting that England would be playing positively to get the target – but Lee and Warne just kept pounding. Trescothick departed for 44, edging a straight ball from Warne to first slip – having taken him for ten in the previous over – and Bell was left hopelessly plumb to a ball that didn't turn. When Vaughan – who had failed to buy a run off the last 23 deliveries – was bowled comprehensively by Lee, there was nowhere to hide for England, and not even an unbeaten 42 from Pietersen to see England to stumps could hide the inevitable – that England needed 301 for the last five wickets, with a world-class bowling attack at the other end.

==== Day Four ====
Rain frustrated both Australia and neutral fans on the morning of the fourth day, but after four hours the sun finally broke through and the covers were taken off. It only took ten overs for Australia to wrap up England's innings, McGrath taking four of the five wickets required and Warne the last – Giles, Hoggard, Harmison and Simon Jones all gone for ducks – as England could only add 24 runs, 22 of them from Pietersen who was left stranded on an unbeaten 64 to have a Test batting average of 121 after the first match. (Cricinfo scorecard)

=== Second Test: England v Australia (4–7 August) ===
England
407
&
182
England won by 2 runs

ME Trescothick 90
SK Warne 4/116

A Flintoff 73
SK Warne 6/46

Edgbaston, Birmingham, England
Umpires: BF Bowden (NZ) and RE Koertzen (SA)
Man of the Match: A Flintoff (Eng)

Australia
308
&
279

JL Langer 82
A Flintoff 3/52

B Lee 43*
A Flintoff 4/79

==== Day One ====
The psychological battles before the match saw Australia planting many stories in the press about England already being in trouble. England kept quieter, until just before the game stories appeared about how the Edgbaston game would be decided at the toss: whichever side won it would choose to bowl first and would win. England's mind games paid dividends when Ricky Ponting did just that, as Michael Vaughan admitted that if he had won the toss, he'd have batted, and as the match progressed, it became clearer and clearer that the pitch would take plenty of turn near the end.

England took advantage of being inserted and came back strongly, especially considering the 239-run drubbing they had received at Lord's a couple of weeks earlier. The Australian bowlers were smashed to all corners on the first day as, for the first time in their 493-Test history, Australia conceded more than 400 runs in a first day of Test cricket. The English mentality seemed to be to attack from the outset, and it was helped by the freak injury that Glenn McGrath sustained before the match. During a warm-up (playing rugby), the pace-man accidentally stood on a cricket ball, tearing ankle ligaments. Australia had to field Michael Kasprowicz as replacement, and on a pitch where inaccurate bowling was immediately punished, McGrath's line and length would surely have been useful.

Instead, Marcus Trescothick made innumerable smashes off Brett Lee to the cover boundary. Andrew Strauss preferred Jason Gillespie for his runs, and their 112-run opening partnership was the highest by England in the Ashes series so far this year – indeed, the second highest of the series thus far, only beaten by Damien Martyn and Michael Clarke's 155 at Lord's. They continued on their fine form from Lord's, where they had made 80 in the second innings, and the jitters from the one-day series seemed to have vanished with McGrath. Admittedly, Trescothick was caught off a no-ball on 32, but few remembered that as he crafted his way to 90 – being second out shortly after lunch, with the score 164 for 2, after only 32.3 overs.

England lost both Ian Bell, who continued his relatively poor Ashes series with his third successive single-figure score, and Michael Vaughan, who pulled a short Gillespie delivery to the hands of Lee, in the space of the next five overs, but still pounded on. Kevin Pietersen, in his second Test match, hit ten fours and one six, and forged a 103-run partnership in 105 balls with Andrew Flintoff, which turned the match back to England's favour. Flintoff's 68 was scored quickly, including five sixes, and again Lee got the most stick – he was taken for 26 in the 18 balls he faced.

Lee did get one wicket, though, and Australia could have been forgiven for thinking it was the most important. Pietersen pulled to Simon Katich for 71, off just 76 balls, and with the score on 342 for 7, England would have to get something extraordinary out of the tail to get past 400. But they did – Steve Harmison smacked two fours and a six in an entertaining, if brief, 17, and Simon Jones stuck around with Matthew Hoggard for a vital last-wicket partnership of 32, Jones making 19 not out. Shane Warne finally got the better of Hoggard, but England had made 407, in just under 80 overs. The Australian openers took to the field for the last half-hour of the day. However, heavy rain prevented another ball being bowled on the first day.

==== Day Two ====
However, the quick scoring and the first Test result led many people to believe that Australia would come back with a vengeance on the second day of the matcht. Instead, Steve Harmison bowled a maiden over first up to Justin Langer, and Matthew Hayden holed out to Harmison's new-ball partner Matthew Hoggard for a golden duck – the first of Hayden's career. The dismissal was to set the tone of the innings. Although Ricky Ponting and Justin Langer hit runs just as quickly as England had done, the umpire's finger went up twice more before lunch – Ricky Ponting swept to the opposing captain Vaughan for 61, and Damien Martyn was run out taking a risky single for 20. Once again, Vaughan was in the action, hitting the stumps with a throw from mid-off. Langer and Michael Clarke continued after lunch in the same vein, but again, a couple of quick wickets – Clarke edging a quicker ball from Ashley Giles behind and Simon Katich falling in the same way to Andrew Flintoff swung it England's way. At 208 for 5, the Australians were struggling, but another good partnership between Langer and Gilchrist saw them to tea with no further loss.

The pair looked to close England's lead, but again the England bowlers intervened – this time in the shape of the invisible man in England's attack, Simon Jones, who got plenty of reverse swing and used that to trap Langer with a yorker – gone for 82, which was to be Australia's highest score in the innings. Australia's tail – thought to be strengthened by the absence of McGrath, were all dismissed for single-figure scores, Andrew Flintoff taking the two last men lbw with the two last balls, although there was some argument about the first dismissal.

However, England got their 99-run lead and continued to hack away at the Australian bowlers before stumps. After Trescothick and Strauss had smashed boundaries at will against the seamers, Ponting brought on Warne in the seventh over, and Warne broke through with his second ball of the match – a leg break that came into the left-hander's stumps and broke them completely, and Strauss was bowled for 6. Nightwatchman Matthew Hoggard survived four balls to end the day – England still leading by 124, with nine wickets in hand.

==== Day Three ====
The third day was just as exhilarating to spectators as the first two; a total of seventeen wickets fell as Shane Warne and Andrew Flintoff took centre stage in an enthralling contest. First up, however, it was Brett Lee, who shattered England with three quick wickets – Trescothick slashed at a wide delivery, skipper Vaughan disappointed yet again with the bat as he failed to cover his stumps to a straight one, and Hoggard naturally had to go eventually – edging to Hayden in the slips for 1.

England were shaken, with the score at 31 for 4, and with Ian Bell and Kevin Pietersen at the crease. Pietersen could consider himself lucky to survive, after a suggestion he had been caught first ball. He survived, and went on to make 20, only to be given out off a similar situation from Shane Warne. His 41-run partnership with Bell steadied things somewhat, and there were hopes among England fans that Bell would make his first significant score against the tourists. Instead, he fell two overs after Pietersen, having given the tiniest of edges to Gilchrist for 21.

So, with the score at 75 for 6, England once again needed a big partnership, this time from Flintoff and wicket-keeper Geraint Jones. The pair saw England to lunch, but Flintoff had suffered a shoulder injury and looked in obvious pain. In the first over after lunch, Jones gave an edge to Ponting – seven down for 101. Giles batted responsibly, padding up to Warne, but eventually felt the need to play at one, which Hayden held with relative ease. Harmison came and went, facing one delivery, and it was all up to Simon Jones and Andrew Flintoff to see England to a challenging target.

That they did. Jones kept his head, managing 12 runs in his 42-minute stay at the crease with some streaky fours, while Flintoff smacked Lee everywhere. Flintoff also took runs off Kasprowicz, with one over yielding 20 runs for England, including a couple of no-balls. At one point during Flintoff's innings, Ponting had nine men on the boundary, something rarely seen in cricket. One six hit by Flintoff landed on top of the stands. Flintoff ended with 73 – the only man to pass 25 for England – before being bowled by Warne. Warne finished with stunning figures of six for 46 from 23.1 overs, having bowled unchanged from the seventh over till the end – but, as luck and Australia's batsmen would have it, his failure to get Flintoff out earlier would be crucial.

Matthew Hayden and Justin Langer started positively, taking runs off the occasional bad balls that were served up by Harmison, Hoggard and Giles, and before anyone noticed, they had racked up 47 for no loss, and were well on the way to chasing the target of 282. Then, Flintoff came in to bowl his first over. The ball was hurled down the pitch, and swung enough to deceive the Australian batsmen – Flintoff got Langer and Ponting out in the same over, and Australia were struggling again, the score on 48 for 2.

A few overs of relative calm followed, Hayden forging runs with Martyn but never looking too assured, and his dismissal, came in an over where Australia had actually looked on top. However, Simon Jones got the last laugh over Hayden – only to later be reprimanded by the ICC for his celebrations. England kept muscling on, and despite never playing on top of their game they got four more wickets before the scheduled close of play. Giles got two of those, dismissing Katich and Gilchrist, and then an inswinging ball from Flintoff took care of Gillespie, who was trapped lbw.

An extra half-hour of play was allowed, as a result was nearing, but Warne and Clarke defied the English. Warne was lucky on more than one occasion, playing streaky shots that could easily have got him out, but he did smash Giles for 12 in one over. He was not out overnight – however, Steve Harmison, bowling his third spell of the day, brought the third day's proceedings to an end with a slow delivery that was not read correctly by Clarke, who missed the ball completely to be bowled. England now only needed two wickets on the fourth day – Australia, however, needed 107 runs for the victory.

==== Day Four ====
On the fourth day, Australia defied all predictions with a 45-run partnership between Warne and Lee, before Warne was forced back onto his stumps by Flintoff to get dismissed hit wicket. Kasprowicz came in and supported Lee well, fending off aggressive bowling from Flintoff and Harmison. The pair had England on the back foot as their victory target neared closer and closer, edging virtually everything. With three to win, and three results possible, Harmison had Kasprowicz caught behind, with replays showing that the ball hit the batsman's hand when it was off the bat. If the hand had been on the bat, it would have been a correct decision – as it stood, it was incorrect to give him out. However, that mattered little to most viewers, who recognised the difficult job of the umpire. England were thus victors – if in almost the most narrow way possible – and the series very much alive. (Cricinfo scorecard)

Rather than engaging in the victory celebrations, the immediate reaction of Flintoff to the winning dismissal was to console the despondent batsmen—a gesture which was widely commented upon as indicative of the good sportsmanship and mutual respect between the teams which characterised the series.

England's two run victory is the narrowest result in Ashes cricket history (there have been two Tests won by a margin of only three runs). It is also the second narrowest run victory in all Test cricket history. (other narrow victories given here)

=== Third Test: England v Australia (11–15 August) ===
England
444
&
280/6d
Match drawn

MP Vaughan 166
SK Warne 4/99

AJ Strauss 106
GD McGrath 5/115

Old Trafford, Manchester, England
Umpires: BF Bowden (NZ) and SA Bucknor (Jamaica)
Man of the Match: RT Ponting (Aus)

Australia
302
&
371/9

SK Warne 90
SP Jones 6/53

RT Ponting 156
A Flintoff 4/71

==== Day One ====
With the series square after England's close win in the second match at Edgbaston in Birmingham, the stakes of the third Test at Old Trafford in Manchester had risen significantly. The day began with England winning the toss, and choosing to bat first, thus giving Shane Warne a chance to become the first man to take 600 Test wickets in England's first innings, and he did so against Marcus Trescothick who mistimed a sweep shot and was caught behind by Australian wicket-keeper Adam Gilchrist, earning Warne a standing ovation from the Old Trafford crowd.

After naming an unchanged line-up, England were immediately faced by the pairing of Glenn McGrath and Brett Lee. There were doubts about whether these could play before the match started, due to injuries sustained earlier, but they both passed fitness tests. England's wickets fell slowly, with many a missed opportunity for Australia helping the hosts to run up a big first innings total. This was also helped by a fruitful partnership between Trescothick and Michael Vaughan, who added 137 before Trescothick was dismissed after lunch. Vaughan became the first man in the series to get a century.

The frustrated Australia team faced a fearless England side who challenged them at every turn, and recovered nicely even after the dismissals of Trescothick and Vaughan, who couldn't resist smacking a full toss from Katich straight to McGrath at the boundary. Vaughan was dismissed after 166 runs, which was destined to be the highest individual score in the series. Australia were also faced with a more defiant Ian Bell, who had struggled in the first two Tests. Picking up where Vaughan left off after tea, Bell, Kevin Pietersen and nightwatchman Matthew Hoggard closed out the day for England with the score 341 for 5.

==== Day Two ====
Bell did not add to his overnight score, being given out caught behind in controversial circumstances, as replays indicated he did not make contact with the ball. Following a brief rain interval England then lost two more wickets just before lunch, Andrew Flintoff after scoring a quick-fire 46 and Geraint Jones for 42. After lunch Australia quickly dispatched the remaining two wickets for just a further 10 runs, bowling England out for a score of 444, with Glenn McGrath finishing on his worst-ever Test figures of nought for 86.

Australia started their innings tentatively with Matthew Hoggard dropping a low catch Matthew Hayden off his own bowling. Just before tea Australia lost their first wicket with Hayden out caught at short leg from Ashley Giles first over. After tea Australia lost another couple of wickets, Ricky Ponting caught for seven and Hayden given out lbw for 34. Gilchrist put on 30 before edging the first ball of Simon Jones' spell to Geraint Jones.

This brought in Michael Clarke who had been recuperating at the team hotel after damaging his back on the first day. Due to this injury, Clarke needed Hayden to act as a runner. Warne made inroads with the bat, just like at Edgbaston four days previously, but Clarke only managed to add seven runs before being deceived by a slower ball from Simon Jones. Warne and Jason Gillespie saw the day out with Warne finishing on 45 not out.

The day finished with Australia on 214 for 7, 230 behind and needing another 31 runs to avoid a follow-on. The score was adjusted from 210 overnight due to an umpire failing to signal a four byes.

==== Day Three ====
Rain delayed the start of play until 16:00 BST, and even then only 8 overs were possible before play was again suspended, although a further 6 overs were bowled later on before yet more rain meant that play was abandoned for the day. Australia had the better of the short day's play, adding 50 runs without loss to pass the follow-on target, although Warne was lucky to survive on two occasions thanks to errors by Geraint Jones: when Warne had 55 he missed a relatively straightforward stumping opportunity, and on 68 he was dropped after edging a ball from Flintoff. Australia closed on 264 for 7, still 180 in arrears, but England probably felt that they missed several opportunities to put the game beyond their opponents.

==== Day Four ====
Having been hampered by a rain-shortened day three, the Australians were ready to put more wood to the ball on day four, and they did not disappoint. Warne continued his march towards his maiden Test century before holing out with a hook shot to a well placed Giles at 90. Simon Jones mopped up the other two wickets to bowl Australia out for 302, Jones finishing the innings with a career best figures of six for 53.

The English opening batsmen of Andrew Strauss and Marcus Trescothick began England's response, scoring 26 before lunch. After lunch, Trescothick played on to be bowled after scoring 41 giving McGrath his first wicket of the match. Strauss put together a fine century, his sixth from just 17 matches, scoring 106 before getting out caught. Gilchrist demonstrated how difficult wicket-keeping was by missing two stumping opportunities to remove Bell and failing to hold a catch to remove Flintoff. Bell capitalised on Gilchrist's errors, partnering Strauss for 28 overs and recording a well-deserved 65. Geraint Jones also added a swift 27 with England more concerned about scoring quickly than staying at the crease, and England declared on 280 to give them a spell at Australia in the evening and a chance of winning the match the next day. McGrath recorded another five-wicket haul in an innings, but was expensive, giving away 115 runs. Warne, despite bowling 25 overs, failed to take a wicket, recording figures of nought for 74.

Australia needed 423 to win, which would be a record fourth innings total to win a match. Australia saw out the last 10 overs without losing a wicket and put 24 runs, leaving 399.

==== Day Five ====
English hopes of a win were high, and 20,000 people were locked out of the stadium in addition to the 23,000 capacity crowd. Australia started the day needing 399 runs from 98 overs if they were to claim an unlikely victory. The day started poorly for them with Langer falling for 14 on the seventh ball of the day, nicking a ball delivered by Matthew Hoggard behind to Geraint Jones. Ponting narrowly survived being run out early on and this proved crucial in the context of the match as the momentum gradually swung in Australia's direction. At one point Australia racked up runs at such a rate that a win became a real possibility. Despite losing Clarke and Jason Gillespie in quick succession to send the team to 264 for 7, Ponting battled on before eventually succumbing to Harmison after seven hours on the crease to record the first Australian century of the series with a score of 156. This was good enough to earn Man of the Match honours.

After the dismissal of Ponting, Australia were 354 for 9 with only four overs remaining, and another thrilling climax occurred with England having a real chance of snatching victory in similar fashion to the second Test. However the unfancied pairing of Brett Lee and Glenn McGrath handled the remaining 24 deliveries to finish on 371 for 9, 52 short of victory but sufficient to draw the game and leave the series tied at 1–1. (Cricinfo scorecard)

=== Fourth Test: England v Australia (25–28 August) ===
England
477
&
129/7
England won by three wickets

A Flintoff 102
SK Warne 4/102

ME Trescothick 27
SK Warne 4/31

Trent Bridge, Nottingham, England
Umpires: Aleem Dar (Pak) and SA Bucknor (WI)
Man of the Match: A Flintoff (Eng)

Australia
218
&
387 (f/o)

B Lee 47
SP Jones 5/44

JL Langer 61
SJ Harmison 3/93

==== Day One ====
Glenn McGrath was once again ruled out due to injury, this time to his elbow, and Australia also dropped the out-of-form Jason Gillespie, leaving them with a seam attack of Brett Lee, debutant Shaun Tait and Michael Kasprowicz. England, having been on top in the last two Tests, were unchanged.

England won the toss and chose to bat, and they got off to a flyer. Boosted by no-balls from the seamers – a total of 18 before lunch – Marcus Trescothick and Andrew Strauss made hay quickly, and enjoyed batting on a pitch which gave the bowlers no aid. They recorded their second 100-run opening partnership of the series, before Strauss was freakishly dismissed for 35, sweeping Shane Warne onto his boot and into Matthew Hayden's waiting hands at slip – a wicket confirmed by the third umpire. Michael Vaughan continued on his fine form from Old Trafford, though, punishing bad balls from Brett Lee to go into lunch with his score on 14. Trescothick, meanwhile, rode his luck, as he was bowled off a no-ball on 55, much to Lee's displeasure. At lunch England were 129 for 1.

Only 3.1 overs were possible in the afternoon session due to rain. Coming back after tea, England immediately lost two wickets to Shaun Tait, who used the cloud cover to good effect and swung the ball well. However, Michael Vaughan and Kevin Pietersen batted well together for a 67-run partnership, although they were each dropped once. Towards the end of the day, Ricky Ponting brought himself on, and his medium pace yielded a wicket – that of Vaughan for 58. Overnight, the match was evenly poised with England 229 for 4.

==== Day Two ====
Australia dismissed Pietersen at the beginning of the morning's play, edging a full outswinger from Lee through to wicket-keeper Gilchrist. But an unbeaten century partnership from Andrew Flintoff and Geraint Jones took England's score to 344 for 5 at lunch.

After lunch, the pair continued to score quickly for another hour, and extended their partnership to 177 before Flintoff was lbw to Tait for 102, his first Test century against Australia. The loss of Flintoff did not deter the English, as Jones continued to hit runs through the off side on the way to his highest score against the Australians, making 85 before he was caught and bowled by Kasprowicz. The next two wickets fell quickly, but a stubborn last-wicket partnership of 23 between Matthew Hoggard and Simon Jones – including an incident where the ball hit the stumps but the bails failed to fall off – saw England to 477 all out at tea.

In the evening session, England's bowlers, especially Matthew Hoggard, managed to find much more swing than the Australian bowlers had done, and ripped through the Australian top order. The first three wickets fell in a crucial period of 11 balls (although the third, which dismissed Damien Martyn lbw, was a debatable decision – television replays indicated that the ball might have hit the bat before the body). By stumps Australia had been reduced to 99 for 5 to complete an excellent day for England.

==== Day Three ====
Simon Katich and Adam Gilchrist decided that attack was the best form of defence, adding 58 in only 8.5 overs in the morning, before England came back to take the next four wickets for the addition of only 18 runs, leaving Australia perilously placed at 175 for 9. Simon Jones was the main culprit, using swing to good effect as he removed Katich and Warne in successive balls, and then had Kasprowicz clean bowled. Brett Lee added 47 in 44 balls, including three huge sixes, to take Australia's score to 218, before he was caught off Simon Jones's bowling to give Jones his fifth wicket of the innings. Despite their aggressive batting, Australia therefore finished the first innings 259 runs behind.

Michael Vaughan then gambled, by enforcing the follow-on on the visitors (the first time Australia had followed on in 17 years). By lunch, Australia had reached 14 without loss in their second innings, and they powered on in the afternoon session, only losing Matthew Hayden and adding 100 more runs before tea. For England, the afternoon session was their worst of the match – to compound their misery, Simon Jones showed signs of injury, and Andrew Strauss dropped Justin Langer on 38.

In the evening session, England managed to take three wickets, but also dropped a catch and missed a stumping. Australia thus finished the day still 37 runs in arrears but with six wickets still in hand. Simon Jones also went off the field during the evening session with an ankle injury, and was taken to hospital for an ankle scan. While Jones was off the field receiving attention, substitute fielder Gary Pratt ran out Australian captain Ricky Ponting, who verbally expressed his displeasure at England's use of subs to the players, umpires and administrators as he left the field.

==== Day Four ====
Day Four began in earnest with Michael Clarke and Simon Katich continuing their partnership from the previous day. However, Katich had already twice flirted with dismissal, saved only by chance both times. In the words of BBC cricket commentator Henry Blofeld, "It's very much a game of chess – white-flannelled figures on green grass." The English and the Australians proceeded into a cold war for a good part of the morning, with England attempting to frustrate the Australian batting, but with the latter refusing to take the bait. England's lead slowly evaporated without a wicket falling, but Matthew Hoggard's taking of Clarke's and then Adam Gilchrist's scalps on either side of the lunch break swung the initiative back into England's hands.

The injury to Simon Jones became somewhat obvious as the pacers struggled to capture the magic that Jones had created the previous day that had forced Australia to follow on. Despite this, the Australian run rate remained low as both sides stared each other down. Mistakes by Geraint Jones and Kevin Pietersen were quickly nullified by the dismissal of Warne for 45 and Kasprowicz for 19, and after a few overs' resistance Tait was bowled middle stump for 4, leaving 129 for the English to chase after tea.

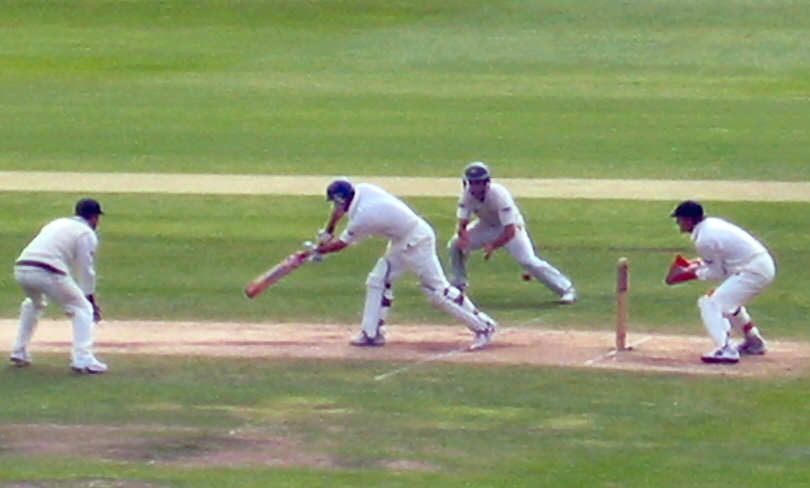
Andrew Strauss plays forward to Shane Warne with Michael Clarke waiting to take the catch.

England then proceeded to send the game into a nailbiter – English wickets fell quickly as Shane Warne took four wickets (including those of Marcus Trescothick (27), Michael Vaughan (0) and Andrew Strauss (23)). Brett Lee dismissed Ian Bell (3) and at 57 for 4 England were in trouble. Andrew Flintoff (26) and Kevin Pietersen (23) then steadied the ship with an invaluable partnership of 46 before both fell in quick succession to Lee. Despite Geraint Jones (3) being dismissed cheaply, the partnership of Ashley Giles (7) and Matthew Hoggard (8) guided the English home. Man of the match honours went to Andrew Flintoff, but more importantly this gave the English a crucial 2–1 edge heading back to London for the fifth and final Test, ensuring that they could not lose the series. However, with the Ashes going to Australia in the event of a drawn series, there was still all to play for at The Oval.

(BBC Scorecard)
Ashes Reactions from the public (last day)

=== Final Test: England v Australia (8–12 September) ===
England
373
&
335
Match Drawn; ENG won series 2–1

AJ Strauss 129
SK Warne 6/122

KP Pietersen 158
SK Warne 6/124

The Oval, London, England
Umpires: BF Bowden (NZ) and RE Koertzen (SA)
Man of the Match: KP Pietersen (Eng)
Men of the Series: A Flintoff (Eng), SK Warne (Aus)
Compton-Miller Award: A Flintoff (Eng)

Australia
367
&
4/0

ML Hayden 138
A Flintoff 5/78

==== Team changes ====
Australia named Glenn McGrath, recovered from an elbow injury, to replace Michael Kasprowicz. England's Simon Jones did not recover from his ankle injury from the previous Test in time to be included in the England team, and was replaced after much speculation by all-rounder Paul Collingwood, in preference to specialist fast bowler James Anderson.

==== Day One ====
The final match to decide the fate of the legendary Ashes urn finally began, and the proverbial first blood was drawn by England as Michael Vaughan won his third toss of the series (much to the delight of the Brit Oval crowd). Vaughan elected to have his English side to bat first, and the English first innings got underway. Marcus Trescothick and Andrew Strauss added 82 for the first wicket, as England's batsmen looked to take on the Australians, but subtle spin variations bowled from Shane Warne yielded three wickets as England went to lunch on 115 for 3.

Shane Warne continued after lunch by taking the wicket of Kevin Pietersen for 14. Andrew Flintoff emerged to form a vital partnership of 143 with Andrew Strauss, before to falling to Glenn McGrath for 72 an hour after tea. Strauss made his 2nd century of the series, before being dismissed by Shane Warne off an acrobatic catch by Simon Katich. The day ended with Geraint Jones and Ashley Giles at the crease, with England 319 for 7. Certain forecasts for London called for showers sometime during the weekend, which, it was thought, might wipe up to a day of action or more from the ledger.

==== Day Two ====
Day two began positively for the Australians, with Jones being bowled for 25 off Brett Lee, and Matthew Hoggard managing a meagre 2 before being dismissed by McGrath. However, Ashley Giles and Steve Harmison frustrated the Australians by taking the score past 370, before Warne trapped Giles lbw shortly before midday, leaving England all out for 373.

The Australian first innings got off to a solid start, with Justin Langer forging a 100 partnership with fellow opener Matthew Hayden – the first opening-partnership century of the series by the Australian cricket team. Langer played some blistering strokes off Giles' bowling in particular, but survived a sharp chance to Marcus Trescothick at first slip. The Australians were offered the light immediately after tea, despite the English protesting and wanting to bowl Giles. The Australians accepted it, and the light never improved, with light rain coming down later. Thus, the day concluded with Australia 112/0, 261 runs behind England.

==== Day Three ====
After a delay for wet field conditions, the third day began with a flurry of action, as both Justin Langer and Matthew Hayden had close calls with lbw appeals, which replays suggested should have been out, and shies at the stumps that just missed. However, no batsman was given out in the morning session, where only 14 overs of play was possible due to rain. Australia added 45 runs in that time.

After lunch Hayden and Langer continued their solid batting, frustrating the England bowlers, with Langer reaching his 22nd Test century. Shortly afterwards, England gained a minor victory as Harmison dismissed Justin Langer, who departed to a rapturous ovation. Ricky Ponting should then have been dismissed for a bat-pad catch off Giles, but Bowden turned down the appeal. Hayden also achieved three-figure success later in the day, while Flintoff's hostile and accurate bowling was rewarded with the wicket of Ricky Ponting, caught at slip by Strauss. With this wicket, Andrew Flintoff equalled Ian Botham's hitherto unique achievement of 300 runs and 20 wickets in an Ashes series. Flintoff had a later appeal for a catch behind turned down by Rudi Koertzen, despite it hitting the bat.

The Australian batsmen once again ended the day early by accepting an offer of bad light, bringing a much-interrupted day to a close after only 45.4 overs. Thanks to dogged batting and at least four umpiring decisions in their favour on the third day, they finished 96 runs behind with eight wickets of their first innings intact.

==== Day Four ====
The fourth day started brightly for England, Damien Martyn hooking a short ball from Flintoff straight into the hands of Collingwood, in the third over of the day, having added only one to his overnight score of nine. Further wickets fell, with an excellent knock by Matthew Hayden been brought to an end by Andrew Flintoff. Flintoff continued with impetus and trapped Simon Katich lbw for 1, before Hoggard had Adam Gilchrist lbw with an inswinger at the stroke of lunch. Gilchrist, however, had added a quick 23 that could be vital, as Australia went into the pavilion 17 runs behind with four wickets in hand.

However, it only took six post-lunch overs for England to end the Australian effort. Geraint Jones dropped a catch off Michael Clarke's bat, but it did not prove to be crucial, as Clarke was lbw to Hoggard in the next over. Warne and McGrath both went for ducks, caught off a mistimed hook and in the slips respectively. Finally Hoggard had Brett Lee (6) caught in the deep and Australia were bowled out for 367. Flintoff finished with five wickets, the second five-for of his career, while Hoggard's four for 97 was his best return of the series.

Thus England, who had expected to begin their second innings chasing a hundred runs or more, were actually leading by six as they took up their bats in mid-afternoon. Australia took a very quick wicket, that of Andrew Strauss, who was dismissed again by Shane Warne, caught bat-and-pad by Katich for a solitary run. The wicket was Warne's 167th against England, equalling Dennis Lillee's Ashes bowling record. 11 balls after this dismissal, umpires Rudi Koertzen and Billy Bowden judged it unfair to continue play due to inadequate light. One additional session of play was however subsequently possible, taking England to a 40-run lead without further loss, before poor light ended the day.

BBC day four synopsis

==== Day Five ====
The fifth day began with the game still finely balanced. Ponting put his trust in his two proven wicket takers – McGrath and Warne. England batted well for forty minutes, with Vaughan taking the game to the Australian bowlers, but McGrath produced two beautiful outswingers to dismiss him and Ian Bell with consecutive deliveries. The Australian charge was diminished by a couple of uncharacteristic dropped catches, but Warne and McGrath combined to take 4 wickets before lunch, leaving England 133 runs ahead with 5 wickets remaining.

The afternoon session was anchored by Pietersen, the beneficiary of three dropped catches, who scored his maiden Test century, with obdurate support from Collingwood and Giles. The session saw only two wickets fall, Collingwood was caught acrobatically by silly mid-off Ponting for 10, and Geraint Jones (1) decisively bowled when he was deceived by a rapid Tait delivery. Pietersen was finally dismissed for 158, a superlative innings including 15 fours and 7 sixes, while Ashley Giles added 59 and Steve Harmison was dismissed for a duck to bring Australia into bat with less than 19 overs remaining.

As the Australians began their innings, it was clear that not enough time remained for them to make up the 341 runs by which they trailed. Almost immediately they were offered the light; and having accepted it, both teams had to return to the dressing rooms to wait for a formal finish. The situation became somewhat farcical. With the match effectively over, the crowd were eager for the Ashes to be presented to England, and the celebrations to begin. After a period of some uncertainty and confusion, at 18:17 BST umpires Koertzen and Bowden removed the bails and pulled up the stumps to signal the end of the match. With no result in this fifth and final Test, England took the series 2–1, regaining the Ashes for the first time since 1987.

Kevin Pietersen, having scored his maiden Test century at a crucial point, was voted Man of the Match by Channel 4 viewers. Andrew Flintoff was chosen by Australian coach John Buchanan as English Man of the Series while English coach Duncan Fletcher selected Shane Warne as the Australian Man of the Series. The new Compton-Miller Award for the overall man of the series (as selected by each side's chairman of selectors Trevor Hohns and David Graveney) was also presented to Andrew Flintoff. Finally, the replica urn was presented to jubilant English skipper Michael Vaughan, thus ending the series in favour of the home side.

The next series, scheduled for 2006–2007, will be played in Australia with England defending the Ashes.

(Cricinfo scorecard)
