= 1992–93 SAARC Quadrangular =

Cricket tournament

- Dates: 3 – 6 December 1992
- Administrator: SAARC cricket
- Cricket format: 50 overs
- Tournament format: Round-robin
- Participants: 4
- Most runs: Navjot Sidhu (139)
- Most wickets: Ajay Sharma (8)

The 1992–93 SAARC Quadrangular was the inaugural SAARC Quadrangular cricket tournament. It started in Dhaka, Bangladesh in December 1992 amidst great enthusiasm and excitement.

== Background ==
4 teams, the 'A' teams from neighbouring India, Pakistan and Sri Lanka, and the full national team of the host country participated in the event. Due to the volatile political situation arising in the sub-continent, the tournament had to be abandoned at the League stage. Thus, there was no winners of the tournament.

== Scores in brief ==
Date	Match	Scorecard	Result
December 3	Bangladesh Vs. Sri Lanka	Sri Lanka 85 (Saiful 3/23, Jahangir 3/19); Bangladesh 87/3 (Nobel 38*, Nannu 32, Labroy 3/35)	Bangladesh wins by 7 wickets
December 4	India Vs. Pakistan	Pakistan 195 (Basit 42, Hanif 37, Rajesh 3/25, Ajay 3/28); India 199/1 (Sidhu 95*, Kambli 46*)	India wins by 9 wickets
December 5	Bangladesh Vs. Pakistan	Bangladesh 159 (Akram 38, Mehedi 5/23); Pakistan 160/5 (Saeed 65, S. Javed 55)	Pakistan wins by 5 wickets
December 6	India Vs. Sri Lanka	India 216/3 (Bhave 81, Kambli 62*); Sri Lanka 149 (Duminda 53, Ajay 5/30)	India wins by 68 runs
December 9	Pakistan Vs. Sri Lanka	Sri Lanka 126 (Hanif 4/36); Pakistan 126/1 (Basit 69*)	Pakistan wins by 9 wickets
December 10	India Vs. Bangladesh	India 30/0 (8 overs); Bangladesh (Did not bat)	The match & the Tournament abandoned

India came to the tournament with the strongest team, and they were the favourites to lift the trophy. The didn't get the chance to do that, but some of the players were rewarded for their brilliant performances. Both Vinod Kambli and off-spinner Rajesh Chauhan made their test debut against England at Eden Garden, Calcutta, in Jan 1993. Navjot Singh Sidhu was recalled to open the batting, and he remained a regular member of the Indian national team till the end of the decade. Maninder Singh, the captain of the 'A' team, was recalled briefly, for the one-off test Match against Zimbabwe in March 1993. Ajay Sharma, the highest wicket taker of the tournament, earned himself a recall to the Indian ODI team. In contrast, the future Indian captain Sourav Ganguly played in all the games, but never got the chance to bat. His only over in the tournament, against the Pakistanis, went for 13 runs.

Pakistan didn't send their strongest available team. Instead, they gave opportunity to some youngsters. The openers, Basit Ali and Shaheed Anwar, impressed with their aggressive batting. Their seamers did well, but they didn't have the quality spinner required for slow turning pitches. The Lankan team was very weak, and they were badly beaten in all the games. Still, The pacer Graeme Labrooy, bowled with plenty of heart.

For the hosts, their best moment came on the opening day, with a crushing defeat of the Lankans. The medium pacers Saiful Islam, Jahangir Alam Talukdar Dulu & Gholam Nousher Prince bowled the opposition out for a mere 85. The Abedin brothers, Nobel & Nannu, then did the rest. The seamers bowled well again against Pakistan, putting them under pressure initially, but at the end the hosts didn't have enough runs on the board.

== Statistics ==
Top batsmen of the tournament
Name	Matches	Runs	Average	Highest Score	50
Vinod Kambli (Ind)	2	108	(Note: He batted twice and remained unbeaten on each occasion.)	62*	1
Navjot Sidhu (Ind)	2	131	131.00	95*	1
Surendara Bhave (Ind)	2	123	61.50	81	1
Basit Ali (Pak)	3	111	55.50	69*	1
Shaheed Anwar (Pak)	3	105	35.00	65	1
Top bowlers of the tournament
Name	Matches	Runs	Wickets	Average	Best
Ajay Sharma (Ind)	2	58	8	7.25	5/30
Tanvir Mehedi (Pak)	3	72	6	12.00	5/23
Aamer Hanif (Pak)	3	100	5	20.00	4/36

== An eventual success ==
Though the 1st SAARC Quadrangular ended abruptly, the idea lived on. And in Dec. 1994, the 2nd event took place successfully. India, led by Pravin Amre won the trophy, beating Bangladesh in the final. Pakistan won the 3rd event, (Feb. 1997) beating arch rivals India in a rain affected final. Bangladesh lost all their 3 games in 1997, but it was by no means a disgraceful performance, as the oppositions in this tournament were far superior to anything before. In fact, this tournament provided a very useful preparation for the team which went to win the ICC Trophy in April. Soon, Bangladesh became a full member the ICC & with Bangladesh regularly hosting full ODI matches the need for the SAARC tournament became obsolete. Nevertheless, there is still considerable amount of 'A' grade cricket played among the South Asian nations.
