= Anisur Rahman (cricketer) =

Bangladeshi cricketer and umpire (born 1971)

Anisur Rahman আনিসুর রহমান
Personal information
- Born: 1 March 1971 (age 55); Dacca, East Pakistan (present-day Dhaka, Bangladesh)
- Bowling: Left-arm medium-fast
- Role: Umpire

International information
- National side: Bangladesh
- ODI debut (cap 24): 5 April 1995 v India
- Last ODI: 25 May 1998 v India

Umpiring information
- ODIs umpired: 9 (2014–2018)
- T20Is umpired: 13 (2012–2018)
- WODIs umpired: 4 (2009–2017)
- WT20Is umpired: 1 (2012)
- FC umpired: 67 (2007–2018)
- LA umpired: 105 (2007–2018)
- T20 umpired: 49 (2010–2018)

Career statistics
Competition	ODIs	FC	LA
Matches	2	35	47
Runs scored	2	496	98
Batting average	1.00	11.02	5.44
100s/50s	–/–	0/2	0/0
Top score	2	56	13
Balls bowled	48	4,105	2,046
Wickets	–	66	57
Bowling average	–	29.84	25.52
5 wickets in innings	–	1	1
10 wickets in match	–	0	0
Best bowling	–	6/38	5/42
Catches/stumpings	–/–	23/0	15/0
- Source: ESPNcricinfo, 12 February 2021

Anisur Rahman (Bengali: আনিসুর রহমান; born 1 March 1971) is a Bangladeshi cricket umpire and former cricketer who played in two ODIs from 1995 to 1998. He has stood as an umpire in nine ODI games between 2014 and 2018, and in 13 Twenty20 Internationals between 2012 and 2018.

== The early days ==
The tall left armer was successful with the ball in the U-19 Asia cup in 1989. There he took 3/44 against India, and 3/36 against Pakistan.

He was elevated to the national squad. There, however, he struggled to hold his place, as Bangladesh already had two other left arm seamers, Gholam Nousher and Jahangir Alam Talukdar. Anisur Rahman's career was also hampered by injuries and No-Ball problem. Still, he briefly emerged in 1994, following the retirement of Prince and Dulu, as the country's top pace bowler.

== International cricket ==
In the 1994–95 SAARC Quadrangular Tournament at Dhaka, (December 1994), he took 3/29 against Pakistan A, 4/29 against Sri Lanka A, & 3/28 against India A. In these matches, he used the reverse swing of the old ball with great effect. In fact, Anisur Rahman was one of the first Bangladeshi bowler to successfully use the reverse swing.

He played in 2 ODIs against India, but failed to impress. On each occasion, he suffered at the hands of Sachin Tendulkar.

== As an umpire ==
Anisur Rahman stood his first match as an on-field umpire in 2012 in a T20I match between Bangladesh and West Indies. In 2014, he stood his first ODI match as an umpire in a match between Bangladesh and Sri Lanka. He stood his last match as an umpire in the group match between India and Afghanistan in the 2018 Asia Cup.

Format	First	Latest	Total	Ref(s)
ODIs	Bangladesh vs Sri Lanka at Mirpur, 20 Feb 2014	Afghanistan vs India at Dubai, 25 Sept 2018	9	
T20Is	Bangladesh vs West Indies at Mirpur, 10 Dec 2012	Bangladesh vs Sri Lanka at Mirpur, 15 Feb 2018	13	

- as on 26 October 2018

== Retirement as an umpire ==
After the group match between Afghanistan and India in 2018 Asia Cup, he did not officiate any matches and quit his umpiring profession for uncertainty of career under Bangladesh Cricket Board and settled in USA in order to pursue a better career in other profession.

== See also ==
- List of One Day International cricket umpires
- List of Twenty20 International cricket umpires
