= Bangladeshi cricket team in England in 2005 =

	Bangladesh	England
- Dates: 10 May 2005 – 30 June 2005
Captains	Habibul Bashar	Michael Vaughan

Test series
- Result: England won the 2-match series 2–0
Most runs	Javed Omar (155)	Marcus Trescothick (345)
Most wickets	Mashrafe Mortaza (4)	Matthew Hoggard (14)
- Player of the series: Javed Omar and Marcus Trescothick

The Bangladesh National Cricket Team toured England for the first time in 2005. Coming into the tour, Bangladesh had clinched their first ever test series win against Zimbabwe, but were still last in the ICC Test Championship table. England, under Michael Vaughan's captaincy, had moved to second in the Test points table.

Bangladesh started their tour with warm-up games against the British Universities, Sussex and Northamptonshire. They then played two test matches against England both resulting in an innings defeat, with neither of the games reaching lunch on the third day. The tour then moved on to one-day matches. Warm-up games for one day internationals were played against Derbyshire and Worcestershire before Bangladesh took on England and Australia in the tri-nations NatWest Series, where they pulled off a stunning victory over the world champions Australia.

== Tour matches ==
The tour started with a comfortable draw against British Universities at Fenner's, before stuttering to a disastrous innings defeat against Sussex, and resulting in a draw in a rainy match against Northamptonshire. After the Sussex Test, the Bangladeshi team played England. Despite commentators saying England were not at their best, England won by an innings and 261 runs. The second Test was won by an innings and 27 runs, resulting in a 2–0 series victory for England as they continued into the one-day international tri-series with Australia.

=== British Universities v Bangladesh ===
British Universities drew with Bangladesh

Bangladesh started their tour of England with an easy warm-up game against British Universities. Bangladesh batted first at a chilly Fenner's, but with an unbeaten century from Javed Omar they finished the rain-affected first day on a comfortable 238 for 3, after being reduced to 99 for 3. The second day was also a successful one for the tourists. Omar finished on 167 and Mohammad Ashraful scored 102 as Bangladesh finished on 381. In reply, British Universities stuttered to 82 for 5, before Luke Parker and Josh Knappett steadied the ship, leaving the students on 190 for 5 at close, with a draw the most likely result on the third day.

The students finished their innings on 238 on the final day, and the Bangladeshis opted for batting practice, finishing on 246 for 4 declared. Overall, a pleasing first game for Bangladesh. (Cricinfo scorecard)

=== Sussex v Bangladesh ===
Sussex beat the Bangladeshis by an innings and 226 runs

Sussex recorded a big victory at Hove, smacking the Bangladeshi bowlers at will before bowling them out twice for a pittance, which didn't exactly give the Bangladeshis any confidence a week before the first Test at Lord's. Michael Yardy was the star of the match, notching up 35 fours and two sixes in a towering 257 – the highest score of the English first class season so far – which led Sussex to 549 for 7 declared. In reply, Habibul Bashar got hit by a bouncer from Jason Lewry when on 22 not out, and thus had to retire, and things only went downhill from there. The Bangladeshis could only manage a total of 323 runs from two innings (127 and 196), with 16-year-old wicketkeeper Mushfiqur Rahim the only one who passed forty runs with a two-hour 63 in the second innings, before being stumped off a delivery by the Man of the Match, Yardy – who recorded his first career five-wicket haul, taking five for 83. (Cricinfo scorecard)

=== Northamptonshire v Bangladeshis ===
Northamptonshire drew with the Bangladeshis

On the first day at Northampton, Northamptonshire made 149 for 5 against the touring Bangladeshis. The tourists' bowlers lured the county batsmen into playing odd strokes to loose balls, but not Bilal Shafayat, who made 76 before mistiming one off left-arm spinner Enamul Haque. However, it was Anwar Hossain Monir who did the most damage, taking 3 for 67. The second day was wiped out by rain, which resulted in the third day becoming somewhat pointless – Anwar added the wicket of Matthew Friedlander to his tally as he finished with four for 113, while the Bangladeshis lost wickets quickly in their reply, crumbling to 105 for 5. However, 16-year-old prodigy Mushfiqur Rahim continued his good run of form, scoring 115 not out with 15 fours and a six to lift the Bangladeshis to 309 for 7 in their glorified nets session. (Cricinfo scorecard)

== Test series ==
=== 1st Test ===
26–30 May 2005
Scorecard

Bangladesh	v	England
108 (38.2 overs); Javed Omar 22 (60); MJ Hoggard 4/42 [13.2]		528/3d (112 overs); ME Trescothick 194 (259); Mashrafe Mortaza 2/107 [29]
159 (39.5 overs); Khaled Mashud 44 (85); SP Jones 3/29 [11]

England won by an innings and 261 runs
Lord's, London
Umpires: K Hariharan (Ind) and DJ Harper (Aus)
Player of the match: ME Trescothick (Eng)

- England won the toss and elected to field.

Michael Vaughan won the toss and put Bangladesh in to bat at 10.30 am on the first day at Lord's. The first ten overs of bowling by Steve Harmison and Matthew Hoggard were lacklustre, as neither mastered the early-morning swing and they bowled a wide line. A stronger side would have scored more runs in this period, but Bangladesh made only 31 before losing their first wicket. The Bangladesh captain, Habibul Bashar, then came and went with a suicidal hoick when he was on three. The rest of the team succumbed quickly, often to bad balls as they failed to adjust to the English conditions. The English mixed the odd good length ball with the short and wide stuff, inducing edges through to the slips at regular intervals – although, admittedly, the Bangladeshis would never have been out if they'd tried to play a bit more defensively.

Javed Omar was the pick of the batsmen, scoring 22 before being caught by Marcus Trescothick off the most accurate of the English bowlers, Simon Jones. With six batsmen out in single figures, only Aftab Ahmed looked in control, before he also edged Andrew Flintoff to slip. In the end, Bangladesh made just 108 in 38.2 overs, despite being boosted by 12 English no-balls – eight from Hoggard, four from Harmison. Few batsmen even displayed the standard practice of getting behind a swinging ball and playing with a straight bat, preferring instead to stay still and nudge at the ball.

Marcus Trescothick and Andrew Strauss then batted to tea with composure, taking the boundaries off Test debutant Shahadat Hossain in particular, and the pair made 70 runs before tea – meaning that England were only 38 off with ten wickets in hand after two sessions. An hour after tea, England brought up the lead, with Strauss having notched his fifty despite looking slightly shaky against Anwar Hossain Monir's bowling, and then being dropped on 51. Trescothick then made his fifty with a four off Mohammad Rafique. The opening partnership eventually was worth 148, as Strauss was nearly lbw on 69 with an inswinging ball on one ball and then finally lbw on the next, Mashrafe Mortaza getting rewards for his patient bowling.

England, however, continued to paste the bowlers, although skipper Michael Vaughan was lucky on more than one occasion – the most notable when he was dropped by Mohammad Rafique off Rafique's own bowling. By stumps, however, the pair had added 40, and they continued on a sunny second day – less rusty, however, than they had been on the first day. It was all too embarrassing for Bangladesh, as Vaughan raced to 120 before being caught behind off Mashrafe. Four overs later, the patient Rafique finally got his reward, Khaled Mashud coming up with a magnificent catch to get Trescothick out six short of a double century. That was as good as it got for Bangladesh, though, as Ian Bell, Warwickshire's prodigy, made 65 not out, and Graham Thorpe ran runs everywhere to score 42 not out with only two boundaries, before Vaughan decided that enough was enough and declared with seven wickets in hand and a lead of 420 runs.

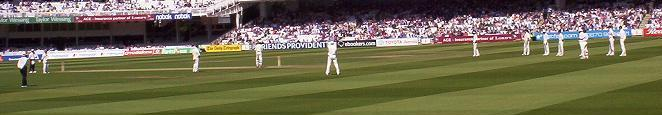
England set a very attacking field against Bangladesh on the third day. Only the bowler and silly point are in front of the stumps.

Bangladesh's reply was a sorry one. Yet again, they failed to play the short ball well enough, and lost five wickets – Simon Jones and Andrew Flintoff the main culprits, taking two each – for a miserable 65 before Khalid Mashud and Aftab Ahmed took some responsibility and guided them to stumps with 95 for 5. It was not to last, though. Only six balls into the third day, Hoggard bowled a good off-cutter to Aftab Ahmed, who failed to play it properly and was hit on the pads – out for a fine 32, Bangladesh's highest score in the Test series so far.

Steve Harmison then bowled the next over from the Pavilion End, removing spinner Rafique for a duck on his second ball of the over as he was caught behind and then having Mortaza bowled as Mortaza missed the ball only to have it graze his pad and roll behind him to hit his leg stump. Bangladesh had lost three wickets for two runs in the space of nine balls, and Harmison nearly added another wicket to his tally as he hit Anwar Hossain Monir on the pad in front. However, umpire Hariharan wasn't convinced it was going to hit the stumps, and Harmison was denied the hat-trick.

The end looked to be even more abrupt than people could think, before the third day had started. However, a no-ball-aided recovery and some fine batting from wicket-keeper Khaled Mashud, who surpassed Aftab Ahmed's score, sent the match into a slow-death period. Anwar Hossain and Khaled Mashud did, however, manage to put on 58 together for the ninth wicket, Bangladesh's best partnership of the match. Simon Jones eventually broke through the defences, though, as Anwar Hossain Monir got a standard thick edge to first slip Trescothick, and thus the ninth wicket fell – 156 for 9. An over later, Khaled Mashud was finally out, giving an awkward edge off Andrew Flintoff's bowling to Graham Thorpe at short leg and ending the innings on 159 all out – giving England an innings and 261 run win just before noon, half an hour before lunch, on the third day. Gareth Batty – England's spin-bowler, who came in to replace the injured Ashley Giles – was only mentioned on the official scorecard once, as he did not bat, did not bowl, and did not hold a catch. Trescothick was named man of the match for his 194. (Cricinfo scorecard)

=== 2nd Test ===
3–7 June 2005
Scorecard

Bangladesh	v	England
104 (39.5 overs); Javed Omar 37 (83); SJ Harmison 5/38 [12.5]		447/3d (78 overs); IR Bell 162* (168); Mashrafe Mortaza 2/91 [22]
316 (72.5 overs); Aftab Ahmed 82* (82); MJ Hoggard 5/73 [15.5]

England won by an innings and 27 runs
Riverside Ground, Chester-le-Street
Umpires: DJ Harper (Aus) and AL Hill (NZ)
Player of the match: MJ Hoggard (Eng)
Players of the Series: Javed Omar (Ban) and ME Trescothick (Eng)

- England won the toss and elected to field.
- Graham Thorpe (Eng) played in his 100th and final Test.

Michael Vaughan won the toss again, just like in the first Test, and put Bangladesh into bat. A thoroughly professional bowling performance from the England bowlers followed, with Harmison, playing at his home ground, making the most of the conditions to take 5 wickets as the clearly outclassed Bangladeshis succumbed for 104. Only Javed Omar and Khaled Mashud made it into double figures. In reply, England quickly overcame the deficit for the loss of just Andrew Strauss, the only English batter who averaged less than 80 in this Test series. By close on the first day England were 269 for 3, with pundits reckoning the game would not reach the third day.

On the second day, Ian Bell became the first Englishman to score 100 before lunch in a Test match for 70 years, the last one being Les Ames, as both Bell and Thorpe hit out ahead of the predicted lunchtime declaration, which happened with England on 447 for 3. What followed was what the series had been crying out for earlier: a spirited Bangladeshi performance with proper cricketing shots. Whilst some Bangladeshis did get out to wild shots, the senior players got behind the ball, selected which ball to play, and made the most of the aggressive field placings chosen by England to make partnerships and build innings.

First out was Nafees Iqbal, caught behind for 15 with the score on 50. Iqbal was unlucky, as the video replays suggested the ball had bounced before going into Geraint Jones's gloves, but despite returning to the pitch to appeal to the umpires, Iqbal had to go. Opener Javed Omar, captain Habibul Bashar and Aftab Ahmed all made half-centuries as it was touch and go as to whether England would wrap it up in the two days. When the seventh wicket fell at 245 in the last over of normal play, it allowed England to claim the extra half-hour. But only one more wicket fell as Bangladesh restored some pride. England wrapped up the game within 20 minutes on the third day, but Bangladesh, albeit against an attacking field had made 316, 27 short of making the hosts bat again.

England therefore won the two Test series 2–0, taking both matches by more than an innings. This was their fifth successive Test series win, and the first time that the English had won five successive Test series since 1971. With their first three innings all being over before the Bangladeshis made 200, the series was clearly England's, who consolidated their position at second in the ICC Test Championship table. Bangladesh remain bottom in tenth place. Afterwards England captain Michael Vaughan said, "It's difficult to judge how much we've got out of these games because we've won so easily. We've not had those real tough-in sessions and fight-through sessions where we've lost a batch of wickets. We have had stages when we had to knuckle down but it has been easier than I expected. To win two Test matches in almost two days each is obviously quite an easy series victory." (Cricinfo scorecard)

== One-dayers ==
After a poor first-class section of the tour, Bangladesh were hoping things would improve on the one-day leg, particularly after their spirited second innings in the Second Test. However, their first warm-up match for the NatWest Series saw them heavily defeated by Derbyshire, but they recovered well to take a six-wicket win over Worcestershire. It was back to normal at The Oval, though, as their bowlers went astray and England cruised to a ten-wicket win.

On 18 June, Bangladesh defeated Australia by 5 wickets in the NatWest Series. Australia scored 249 in 50 overs. Bangladesh won with 4 balls to spare, after a century by Mohammad Ashraful. Bangladesh were knocked out of the tournament after three subsequent losses.

=== Match details ===
==== Derbyshire v Bangladeshis (10 June) ====
Derbyshire beat the Bangladeshis by 6 wickets

Derbyshire easily overcame the Bangladeshis in a day-night match at Derby. The Bangladeshis won the toss and chose to bat first against a Derbyshire side that was full-strength except for the injured Michael di Venuto. When Javed Omar, Nafees Iqbal and Rajin Saleh were out cheaply the tourists had fallen to 19 for 3. Tushar Imran and Habibul Bashar then gave some hope that a genuine target might be set when they put on 80 for the fourth wicket, a partnership that included 2 sixes from Tushar Imran. After that, the Bangladeshis lost wickets at regular intervals, finally being all out for 189 with 3.5 overs to spare. Just as Bangladesh's bowling lacked penetration in the Tests, so it lacked penetration against Derbyshire, with Jonathan Moss's 72 helping the hosts home with 11.5 overs and 6 wickets to spare. (Cricinfo scorecard)

==== Worcestershire v Bangladeshis (12 June) ====
The Bangladeshis beat Worcestershire by four wickets

Bangladesh recorded their first victory of their tour of England when they beat Worcestershire at The County Ground, Worcester. In a disciplined bowling effort, Nazmul Hossain took two early wickets, Worcestershire collapsed to 168 (despite Bangladesh giving up 33 wides and 6 no-balls), and in a slow, gritty chase, the Bangladeshis – guided by Habibul Bashar's 26 not out and 43 from Javed Omar, made it to the target with 14 overs to spare. (Cricinfo scorecard)

==== England v Bangladesh (16 June) ====
16 June 2005
Scorecard

Bangladesh; 190 (45.2 overs)	v	England; 192/0 (24.5 overs)
Aftab Ahmed 51 (58); SJ Harmison 4/39 [10]		ME Trescothick 100* (76)

England won by 10 wickets
The Oval, London
Umpires: Aleem Dar (Pak) and MR Benson (Eng)
Player of the match: ME Trescothick (Eng)

- England won the toss and elected to field.

Amid rains at The Oval, Jon Lewis had a stunning ODI debut for the English cricket team against Bangladesh, removing Javed Omar and Mohammad Ashraful with successive deliveries before taking out Nafees Iqbal in a good opening spell. Admittedly, it was aided by cloudy skies, which gave Lewis plenty of swing – his main threat – but it was still a decent return for the debutant. Steve Harmison was his usual erratic self, going for nine off the first five balls of an over before removing Tushar Imran with a ball that was gloved onto the stumps just before the end of 15 overs, making it 57 for 4. Habibul Bashar, the highest averaging Bangladesh batsman, gloved a short ball from Harmison to a diving Geraint Jones, and he was on his way for 19 – Bangladesh now 72 for 5. Lewis actually bowled his ten overs straight, ending with three for 32, as the last over was just an exercise in defending from the visitors. Wicketkeeper Khaled Mashud was next to go, attempting a pull off a poor ball down the legside, for 1. However, a solid recovery from Aftab Ahmed and Mohammad Rafique slowly gave the Bangladeshis a chance, before rain intervened again after 30 overs.

Coming back from the rain break, Aftab and Rafique continued to smack the England bowlers, particularly Paul Collingwood, but eventually Rafique gave a chance to Harmison at long leg and the Bangladeshis were seven down for 152. And only a couple of overs later, Aftab was out in a close run-out decision, for 51. Khaled Mahmud then went for a golden duck, playing a poor shot to a short ball from Harmison, his fourth wicket of the day. However, Nazmul Hossain and Mashrafe Mortaza frustrated the English bowlers, with Darren Gough eventually ending the resistance as he got Nazmul for 6 to end the innings for 190. However, the Bangladeshis offered no resistance in the bowling, as only Mortaza was hit for less than six an over. Marcus Trescothick hit his ninth One Day International century off just 76 balls, Andrew Strauss supplied with a level-headed 82, and ten extras added up to a total of 192. The winning runs – a four from Strauss – were hit inside 25 overs and with all ten wickets to spare. (Cricinfo scorecard)

==== Australia v Bangladesh (18 June) ====
18 June 2005
Scorecard

Australia; 249/5 (50 overs)	v	Bangladesh; 250/5 (49.2 overs)
DR Martyn 77 (112); Tapash Baisya 3/69 [10]		Mohammad Ashraful 100 (101); JN Gillespie 2/41 [9.2]

Bangladesh won by 5 wickets
Sophia Gardens, Cardiff
Umpires: BF Bowden (NZ) and DR Shepherd (Eng)
Player of the match: Mohammad Ashraful (Ban)

- Australia won the toss and elected to bat.

Perhaps the biggest upset in the history of limited overs cricket, Mashrafe Mortaza shocked the Sophia Gardens crowd when he had Adam Gilchrist plumb on the second ball of the second ODI, taking the first Australian wicket without a run yet on the scoreboard – and it was to set the tone of the match. Most people would have expected Australia to swamp Bangladesh, especially after the 10-wicket defeat the Bangladeshi Tigers endured in the opening match with England, but a maiden from Mortaza gave them some hope, at least. Things looked to be going the right way for Australia when Matthew Hayden took a boundary off Tapash Baisya, but another maiden followed, and in the sixth over Ricky Ponting padded up to Tapash Baisya – resulting in an lbw decision given, and Australia were – incredibly – 9 for 2. Cautious batting from Hayden and Damien Martyn followed, but some expensive bowling from Baisya relinquished the initiative, as Australia recovered somewhat. They survived through 15 overs, Hayden being caught off a no-ball from Tapash, but in the 16th, he was bowled by Nazmul Hossain for 37 off an inside edge, just as Hayden were looking to get himself in. Some economical bowling from Mohammad Rafique who bowled ten overs for 31 runs, along with excellent bowling from Mortaza at the death, resulted in Australia finishing on 249 for 5, losing Martyn to Baisya for 77 and Michael Clarke to the same man for 54. In fact, Michael Hussey with 31 not out off 21 balls and Simon Katich with 36 not out off 23 ensured that they got a competitive target.

That was not all, however. The chase began very sedately, only Tushar Imran looking to take runs as he smashed Brad Hogg about, but Hogg got his revenge when Tushar was out for 24, lofting to Katich. Earlier, Nafees Iqbal had gone for 8, and with Javed Omar out as the third man to fall, for 19 off 51 balls, it looked to be business as usual for Bangladesh. But this match had more tricks up its sleeve. Hogg and Clarke leaked runs like a drain, six wides were bowled, and Mohammad Ashraful showed another glimpse of why he's been called Bangladesh's finest batsman. As he made the second ODI hundred in the Bangladesh team's history, he forged a massive 130-run partnership with Habibul Bashar, and had a great two hours at the crease (although dropped on 54) – before picking out Jason Gillespie at long on to be out for exactly 100. Bangladesh still needed 23 runs off 17 balls, but Aftab Ahmed continued his fine form from the Oval match with England, as he first took a leg bye off Ashraful, then gave the strike to Rafique, who smashed a cover driven four before taking another legbye. A four and a dot-ball finished a 10-run over, meaning that Bangladesh now needed only 13 off 12 balls. A good over from McGrath followed, as he conceded only six runs – including an edged four from Rafique. With the last over, Bangladesh needed seven runs, and Ahmed swung the first ball of the over to midwicket for six. Thus, it became a formality – Bangladesh won with four balls and five wickets to spare, almost convincing in today's cricket, and the result meant that the Aussies needed a victory over England at Bristol the following day to have any chance of winning the group stage. (Cricinfo scorecard)

==== England v Bangladesh (21 June) ====
21 June 2005
Scorecard

England; 391/4 (50 overs)	v	Bangladesh; 223 (45.2 overs)
AJ Strauss 152 (128); Nazmul Hossain 3/83 [10]		Mohammad Ashraful 94 (52); PD Collingwood 6/31 [10]

England won by 168 runs
Trent Bridge, Nottingham
Umpires: BF Bowden (NZ) and DR Shepherd (Eng)
Player of the match: PD Collingwood (Eng)

- England won the toss and elected to bat.

Michael Vaughan chose to bat first on a good batting wicket at Trent Bridge, as England looked to set a massive target and keep up their good form. After a bit of a shaky start, with Andrew Strauss being dropped, but Marcus Trescothick smashed boundaries to all corners as Bangladesh's bowlers were made to look distinctly ordinary. Trescothick made a 51-ball fifty, before taking Tapash apart in the 15th over, as England cruised to 128 for 0 after 15 overs. A couple of overs later, Nazmul Hossain made the breakthrough, a massive smash ending in Shahriar Nafees' hands, as Trescothick hit an entertaining 85.

The new batsman Vaughan looked shaky at the crease, and eventually finished with an eight-ball duck, giving an inside edge to Nazmul's bowling. Andrew Flintoff was next to fall, giving a catch off Aftab Ahmed to skipper Habibul Bashar for 17, but good recuperation from Strauss and Paul Collingwood kept the run rate well over six, and Strauss could hit a 100-ball century with a single off Rafique in the fortieth over, and with the next ball Collingwood hit his fifty with a boundary. After ten over, England were 270 for 3, and Strauss and Collingwood decided to have some fun. The next nine overs went for 116 runs, Nazmul getting Strauss with the second last ball of the innings for 152 – England's second highest ODI score, and their highest since 1983. Paul Collingwood made 112 not out as well – only his second ODI century – to propel England to 391 for 4, the second highest ODI score of all time.

Chris Tremlett, England's ODI debutant, started well with good pace – near 140 km/h – while Jon Lewis served up full tosses and wides from the other end. In the tenth over, Tremlett got his due reward, first having Shahriar Nafees gone with an inside edge and then followed up with having Tushar Imran caught behind for a golden duck. Mohammad Ashraful was then given another life, misreading a ball from Tremlett which ended up on the stumps – incredibly, the bails stayed on, so Ashraful survived. The next 20 balls he faced were duly dispatched for runs – he particularly took a liking to Steve Harmison, who conceded more in 17 balls today than in the entire match against Australia – and he made the fastest ODI fifty by a Bangladeshi off just 21 balls. He looked to be on his way to the fifth-fastest ODI century, having hit 94 off 51 balls, but eventually hit one expansive stroke too many as he was bowled by Collingwood.

That calmed the nerves of the England team – after 26 overs, Bangladesh required ten an over for the last 24 overs with seven wickets in hand and Javed Omar and Habibul Bashar – both with a batting strike rate which equated to less than four an over – at the crease. The only question was whether the Bangladeshis could steal a bonus point from the English, which looked unlikely as Collingwood grabbed two quick wickets and reduced them to 180 for 5, and in the next over he removed Javed Omar as the Bangladeshi got an inside edge. Collingwood eventually finished with six for 31, taking Khaled Mashud and Mashrafe Mortaza as well, Mortaza bowled with the last ball of his 10-over-spell – to become the first person in ODI history to make a century and take a six-wicket-haul. Harmison, however, the hero of the last game, had to endure dropped catches off his bowling as he conceded 55 runs from eight overs, but he was not needed to bowl all ten as Tremlett removed Mohammad Rafique for 19, ending the Bangladeshi innings on 223 – 168 runs behind England. Overall, England could take some good batting form from their openers and a stunning debut from Tremlett – who looked much more impressive than Lewis in this game – out of the match, while Bangladesh could be happy with the swashbuckling Ashraful and Nazmul's three wickets. (Cricinfo scorecard)

==== Australia v Bangladesh (25 June) ====
25 June
Scorecard

Bangladesh; 139 (35.2 overs)	v	Australia; 140/0 (19 overs)
Mohammad Ashraful 58 (86); A Symonds 5/18 [7.2]		AC Gilchrist 66* (60); ML Hayden 66* (54)

Australia won by 10 wickets
Old Trafford, Manchester
Umpires: BF Bowden (NZ) and JW Lloyds (Eng)
Player of the match: A Symonds (Aus)

- Australia won the toss and elected to field.

Australia recorded a thumping 10-wicket win over Bangladesh to level their head-to-head record in the NatWest Series to 1–1. Under leaden skies at Old Trafford, Ricky Ponting made the wise decision and chose to bowl, and short-balls from Brett Lee immediately had the Bangladeshis worried. They survived six overs without loss before Javed Omar was trapped by an in-swinger for a 20-ball 3. Tushar Imran was next to fall to Lee, and many expected a procession to begin, but Shahriar Nafees and Mohammad Ashraful gave the crowd a treat with some special strokes. Ashraful had two top-edged sixes, as Lee was dispatched for 20 runs in the eleventh over. By the drinks break after 15 overs, Bangladesh were 76 for 2, having added 53 from the last 39 balls. Ponting, however, brought on the spinners Brad Hogg and Andrew Symonds, who both got a fair amount of turn out of the Old Trafford pitch, and Symonds had Shahriar bowled for 47 with a yorker that he played late to. The next ball, he got the out-of-form captain Habibul Bashar, and the wickets began to tumble quickly. Symonds got five wickets for 18 runs, Hogg three for 29, Bangladesh collapsed from 137 for 6 (when Khaled Mashud was bowled by Hogg) to 139 all out in three overs, as Ashraful went for 58 and no one else really offering any resistance to the slow Australian bowlers.

Bangladesh had Adam Gilchrist in some trouble early on, especially through fast bowler Mashrafe Mortaza, who had him beaten several times in the opening overs, but Matthew Hayden was imposing at the crease, punishing the inevitable bad balls from Nazmul Hossain who was taken off after three overs, having conceded 29 runs. However, no one could stop the rot, Hayden and Gilchrist taking runs at will after a while to see Australia to the target inside 20 overs. Australia thus closed the gap to England to three points, as the situation indicated by the ICC rankings before the series became more and more possible – that Bangladesh were to be whipping boys and England and Australia would go through. (Cricinfo scorecard)

==== England v Bangladesh (26 June) ====
26 June 2005
Scorecard

Bangladesh; 208/7 (50 overs)	v	England; 209/5 (38.5 overs)
Javed Omar 81 (150); A Flintoff 4/29 [9]		AJ Strauss 98 (104); Manjural Islam Rana 3/57 [9.5]

England won by 5 wickets
Headingley, Leeds
Umpires: Aleem Dar (Pak) and Mark Benson (Eng)
Player of the match: AJ Strauss (Eng)

- Bangladesh won the toss and elected to bat.

A lacklustre effort from England's opening bowlers was still enough to beat Bangladesh and cement a final between England and Australia in the NatWest Series. Habibul Bashar won the toss and batted first, and it looked to pay off as Shahriar Nafees, Javed Omar and Tushar Imran milked runs off the English opening bowlers. Especially Simon Jones – returning from injury – was erratic, bowling eight wides in the match, while Darren Gough was just smashed around the park. However, Jones got the early wicket when Nafees cut it to Marcus Trescothick at slip – before Bangladesh rebuilt again. After 16 overs, they were 82 for 1, and looked to build a sizable target.

However, their opener Javed – whose ODI strike rate was just above 50 at the time – slowed things down, and a double blow from Andrew Flintoff – first getting Tushar with an inside edge to have him bowled, and then Mohammad Ashraful for a golden duck – Bodyline-style. That set the Bangladeshis back, and patient bowling from Ashley Giles and Paul Collingwood resulted in the run-out of captain Habibul for 10. With Aftab Ahmed falling for 15, it was up to wicketkeeper Khaled Mashud who did an excellent job in lifting Bangladesh past 200 – taking a particular liking to Gough as he made 42 not out off 43 balls. Flintoff got two more wickets in the innings, finishing with four for 29, as he had Javed bowled for 81 and Mashrafe bowled for 1.

England got off to a very good start, with Trescothick and Andrew Strauss continuing in the vein of previous matches against the Bangladeshis, and pairing up for 99 runs for the first wicket. Trescothick was eventually out for 43 to Mohammad Rafique, giving a catch behind, but despite the spinners taking wickets, they were also expensive, Strauss in particular taking them for runs as he was bowled on 98 – attempting a sweep to bring up the win, the bonus point and his own century. Instead, the win was brought up very anticlimactically, Geraint Jones facing three balls before Manjural Islam Rana served up a wide. A disappointment for England would be that Flintoff still struggled with his batting form, only making 22, though in the match it mattered little – England still took the bonus point and qualified for the final, making the last two games redundant for them. (Cricinfo scorecard)

==== Australia v Bangladesh (30 June) ====
30 June 2005
Scorecard

Bangladesh; 250/8 (50 overs)	v	Australia; 254/4 (48.1 overs)
Shahriar Nafees 75 (116); SR Watson 3/43 [10]		MJ Clarke 80* (104); Mashrafe Mortaza 2/44 [9]

Australia won by 6 wickets
St Lawrence Ground, Canterbury
Umpires: Aleem Dar (Pak) and JW Lloyds (Eng)
Player of the match: Shahriar Nafees (Ban)

- Australia won the toss and elected to field.

The last game of the round robin of the NatWest Series was, as expected, won by the Australians. However, it summed up the improvement Bangladesh had made over the tour of England. In the first international, they were rolled over meekly by a no-balling, rusty English side – twice. In the last, Brett Lee and Jason Gillespie put the pressure on early, and with the aid of Shane Watson had them on the reels with 75 for 5. Yet, Bangladesh recovered to post 250 for 8, and were theoretically in with a chance for most of the game. Yet, they started very, very shakily. Javed Omar was dropped by Matthew Hayden in the third over, only to be out to Jason Gillespie in the next for an eight-ball duck – a disappointing end to a fine series for the Bangladeshi. Brett Lee had both Tushar Imran and Mohammad Ashraful beaten with full deliveries, Bangladesh were 19 for three wickets down – an all too familiar position.

A quickfire 30 from captain Habibul Bashar helped to take away some of the jitters, as Bashar took 16 runs off a Brett Lee over, but a bouncer from Shane Watson wasn't successfully evaded, and Adam Gilchrist could take the catch. Aftab Ahmed had to settle for 7, and it was down to the last two recognised batsmen – Shahriar Nafees, who had quietly moved his way to 25 not out, and wicketkeeper Khaled Mashud. However, the two put on a nigh-on faultless partnership of 94, taking their time to consolidate. Shahriar eventually departed for 75, edging a short ball from Shane Watson to the wicket-keeper – the usual method of dismissal. However, their partnership had given Bangladesh hope, and Mohammad Rafique took advantage with a six off Watson. Despite two more wickets falling – Rafique and Khaled Mahmud (caught at mid-on on the last ball) – Bangladesh had recovered to 250 for 8, which could potentially be tricky to chase.

Mashrafe Mortaza was hit around for twelve in the first over, however, and the momentum swung towards Australia. Mortaza hit back by inducing an outside edge from Matthew Hayden to wicketkeeper Mashud for 1, and four balls later a ball from Mortaza hit captain Ricky Ponting on the pads – but too high to be given out. Gilchrist and Ponting paired up well, however, even though Gilchrist rode his luck with a few drives in the air, but in the tenth over he gave a somewhat dubious catch to slip Khaled Mahmud, and was gone for 45 – all while rain threatened to damage the match. However, the weather gradually improved, along with Australia's chances – after 15 overs, they were 83 for three, having lost Damien Martyn for 9, but only needed slightly less than five an over. However, economical bowling and riskless batting from Australia saw Bangladesh in with a chance again. Ponting and Michael Clarke let the run rate go to more than six an over, but Khaled Mahmud's bowling at the death to Andrew Symonds left a bit to be desired, as Australia could take the necessary runs and win by eleven balls and six wickets to spare. A Bangladeshi – Shahriar Nafees – got the Man of the Match award, possibly for his effort to keep the match exciting after Bangladesh had crumbled to 75 for 5. (Cricinfo scorecard)
