= Biman Bangladesh Airlines cricket team =

Personnel
- Captain: Javed Omar
- Coach: n/a
- Owner: Biman Bangladesh Airlines

Team information
- Founded: 1976
- Home ground: Bangladesh Krira Shikkha Protisthan No 1 Ground, Savar (Capacity : 2,000)

History
- National Cricket League wins: 1 (2000/01)
- Official website: cricketarchive

The Biman Bangladesh Airlines cricket team was a first-class cricket team in Bangladesh that played in only the inaugural 2000–01 domestic season and won the National Cricket League title. The team was sponsored by Biman Bangladesh Airlines, the government-owned airliner of Bangladesh.

The club played its home games at the Bangladesh Krira Shikkha Protisthan No 1 Ground in Savar.

The Biman Bangladesh Airlines team currently plays among the 12 clubs in the Dhaka Metropolis Premier League, which does not have first-class status. Biman also sponsors a team in the Corporate Cricket League.

The team signed 18-year-old Pakistani opening batsman Imran Farhat during the 2000–01 season, and Farhat dominated, scoring 216 runs in the first match of the season and ending up with the most runs in Bangladeshi first class cricket that season. However, Habibul Bashar had the highest first class score for the team, with 224.

== Honours ==
- National Cricket League (1) – 2000–01

== First-class statistics ==
Biman Bangladesh Airlines batting and fielding statistics Qualification: 5 matches
Name	Batting hand	Career	Mat	Inn	NO	Runs	HS	Avg	100	50	Ct	St
Imran Farhat	Left	2000–2001	6	10	2	735	216	91.87	2	4	8	
Habibul Bashar	Right	2000–2001	10	15	1	594	224	42.42	1	3	7	
Hasanuzzaman	Right	2000–2001	10	14	3	575	118	52.27	3	1	4	
Javed Omar	Right	2000–2001	9	14	0	562	102	40.14	2	3	3	
Aminul Islam	Right	2000–2001	9	13	2	553	153	50.27	2	3	4	
Sanwar Hossain	Right	2000–2001	10	11	2	449	116	49.88	1	2	12	
Faruk Ahmed	Right	2000–2001	5	8	1	258	68	36.85	0	1	5	
Ziaur Rashid	Right	2000–2001	7	8	0	171	49	21.37	0	0	7	
Mohammad Sharif	Right	2000–2001	10	12	3	130	26	14.44	0	0	2	
Atiar Rahman	Right	2000–2001	6	6	1	83	38	16.60	0	0	12	1
Jahangir Alam Talukdar	Right	2000–2001	6	6	1	50	18	10.00	0	0	3	
Saifullah Khan	Right	2000–2001	7	7	5	5	2*	2.50	0	0	3	

Biman Bangladesh Airlines bowling statistics as of 28 March 2006; Qualification: 5 matches played
Name	Bowling style	Career	Mat	Ovs	Mdns	Runs	Wkts	Avg	BBI	5wI	10wM
Mohammad Sharif	RMF	2000–2001	10	312.5	67	879	49	17.93	6/31	5	2
Imran Farhat	LB	2000–2001	6	144.2	28	474	23	20.60	7/31	2	0
Saifullah Khan	SLA	2000–2001	7	141	19	489	16	30.56	3/28	0	0
Ziaur Rashid	OB	2000–2001	7	156.5	43	353	14	25.21	3/53	0	0
Jahangir Alam Talukdar	LM	2000–2001	6	129.4	4	313	5	62.60	3/56	0	0
Sanwar Hossain	OB	2000–2001	10	18.5	2	70	3	23.33	1/0	0	0
Habibul Bashar	OB	2000–2001	10	34	1	166	2	83.00	2/65	0	0
Aminul Islam	OB	2000–2001	9	41	2	153	2	76.50	1/19	0	0
Faruk Ahmed	OB	2000–2001	5	8	2	24	2	12.00	2/20	0	0
Hasanuzzaman	RFM	2000–2001	10	28	3	91	1	91.00	1/21	0	0
Javed Omar	LB	2000–2001	9	2	1	5	0				
