= Douglas Lockhart =

Scottish cricketer (born 1976)

Personal information
- Full name: Douglas Ross Lockhart
- Born: 19 January 1976 (age 50); Glasgow, Scotland
- Batting: Right-handed

Career statistics
Competition	ODI	FC	LA
Matches	14	24	105
Runs scored	218	849	1,484
Batting average	24.22	22.94	17.87
100s/50s	0/0	1/4	0/5
Top score	46	151	88*
Catches/stumpings	11/–	34/1	59/9
- Source: CricketArchive, 20 March 2013

Douglas Ross Lockhart (born 19 January 1976) is a Scottish cricketer. He is a right-handed batsman and wicket-keeper.

He has played well over 100 times for the Scotland national team, making his debut in a match against the MCC on 23 August 1995. His One Day International debut for Scotland was against Pakistan on 27 June 2006.

In addition to playing for Scotland, he has also played for the Derbyshire second XI, Oxford University, and one match for the Durham University cricket team.

Outside of cricket, Lockhart worked in the investment industry.
