= Tanvir Mehdi =

Pakistani cricketer (born 1972)

Cricket information
- Batting: Right-handed
- Bowling: Right-arm medium-fast

Career statistics
Competition	ODI
Matches	1
Runs scored	0
Batting average	0.00
100s/50s	0/0
Top score	0
Balls bowled	66
Wickets	1
Bowling average	72.00
5 wickets in innings	0
10 wickets in match	0
Best bowling	1/72
Catches/stumpings	0/–
- Source: CricInfo, 3 May 2006

Tanvir Mehdi (born 7 November 1972), is a former Pakistani cricketer who played one One Day International in 1992. He was regarded as one of the fastest bowlers of his time in Pakistan first-class cricket. His career was cut short for unknown reasons. He bowled the fastest ball of his career at a speed of 154.7 kmph. He was born at Lahore.
