= Aamer Hanif =

Pakistani cricketer (born 1967)

Personal information
- Born: October 4, 1967 (age 59); Lahore, Punjab
- Batting: Right-handed
- Bowling: Right-arm medium

Career statistics
Competition	ODI
Matches	5
Runs scored	89
Batting average	44.50
100s/50s	0/0
Top score	36*
Balls bowled	130
Wickets	4
Bowling average	30.50
5 wickets in innings	0
10 wickets in match	0
Best bowling	3/36
Catches/stumpings	0/–
- Source: CricInfo, 3 May 2006

Aamer Hanif (born 4 October 1967) is a former Pakistani cricketer who played five One Day International between 1993 and 1995. He was born at Lahore.

All five of his international matches came against Sri Lanka although there was a two-year gap between his first match and the four other matches he played for his country. His international debut in 1993 consisted of trapping opening batsman Asanka Gurusinha lbw and making an unbeaten 17 to help his side win the match. He didn't receive another call-up until two years later when the touring team was Sri Lanka again. He played in four one-day matches not having much effect apart from in the third match of a three-match series when he scored his highest score of 36 not out and taking three wickets in a four wicket defeat to Sri Lanka. His performances weren't enough to merit a future call-up and he retired in 2005 from professional cricket with just five one-day international appearances to his name.
