= Atiar Rahman =

Bangladeshi cricketer (born 1974)

Personal information
- Full name: Mohammad Atiar Rahman
- Born: 5 January 1974 (age 52); Dhaka, Bangladesh
- Nickname: Atiar
- Batting: Right-handed
- Role: Wicketkeeper

Domestic team information
- Years: Team
- 1996/97: Bangladesh Cricket Board XI
- 2000/01: Biman Bangladesh Airlines

Career statistics
Competition	FC	LA
Matches	6	11
Runs scored	83	212
Batting average	16.60	23.55
100s/50s	0/0	0/1
Top score	38	84
Catches/stumpings	12/1	17/2
- Source: Cricinfo, 13 September 2014

Mohammad Atiar Rahman (born January 5, 1974) is a former Bangladeshi cricketer who played for Biman Bangladesh Airlines from 1996 to 2001 as wicket-keeper. He played six first-class matches in his maiden first-class season. He was part of the team in its only 2000/01 domestic season.
