= Aftab Ahmed (Bangladeshi cricketer) =

Bangladeshi cricketer

Personal information
- Full name: Aftab Ahmed Chowdhury
- Born: 10 November 1985 (age 41); Chittagong, Bangladesh
- Batting: Right-handed
- Bowling: Right arm medium
- Role: Batsman

International information
- National side: Bangladesh (2004–2010)
- Test debut (cap 39): 26 October 2004 v New Zealand
- Last Test: 12 March 2010 v England
- ODI debut (cap 74): 5 March 2004 v South Africa
- Last ODI: 5 March 2010 v England
- ODI shirt no.: 97
- T20I debut (cap 2): 28 November 2006 v Zimbabwe
- Last T20I: 5 May 2010 v Australia
- T20I shirt no.: 97

Domestic team information
- Years: Team
- 2001/02–: Chittagong Division
- 2008/09: Dhaka Warriors
- 2008/09: ICL Bangladesh XI
- 2012/13: Chittagong Kings
- 2011/12: Dhaka Gladiators

Career statistics
Competition	Test	ODI	T20I
Matches	16	85	11
Runs scored	582	1,954	228
Batting average	20.78	24.73	22.80
100s/50s	0/1	0/14	0/1
Top score	82*	92	62*
Balls bowled	344	739	2
Wickets	5	12	0
Bowling average	47.40	54.66	–
5 wickets in innings	0	1	–
10 wickets in match	0	0	–
Best bowling	2/31	5/31	–
Catches/stumpings	7/–	29/–	4/–
- Source: ESPNcricinfo, 23 September 2017

Aftab Ahmed Chowdhury (Bengali: আফতাব আহেমদ চৌধুরী, born 10 November 1985) is a Bangladeshi former cricketer, who played all formats of the game. He is a right-handed batsman and a right-arm medium bowler. In August 2014, he announced his retirement from all forms of cricket after the 2014/15 domestic season to focus on coaching.

== Early life ==
Aftab Ahmed was born and spent most of his childhood in Chittagong. His first school was St. Mary's School. In his early days Aftab was careless about playing international cricket and even thought of it as a torture. He even refused to get admitted into BKSP as he had to leave his family and friends for it. But his father was a valiant fan of sports and wanted his son to become a cricketer.

Aftab remained passive about his cricketing career and have the record of leaving camp. He was also frustrated about the camps as he was not selected. He said, "I was called many times in the camp but never got a chance in the team." But his waiting paid dividend when he finally received a call from the team.

One day as he was playing he received a long awaiting call from the national team. But his father who played a major role in his emergence as a cricketer was unable to hear the announcement. He died during the 1999 Cricket World Cup

== International career ==
He made his international debut at the 2004 Champions Trophy, and, despite a thirteen-ball duck on debut was retained in the team, owing to good performances at the Under-19 level for Bangladesh. In only the third match of his career he took five wickets to become the first Bangladeshi bowler to achieve this feat in one-day Internationals. With his gentle medium pace he took 5 wickets for 31 runs against New Zealand in the second of three ODI between the two teams, which has led him to bowl ten overs in most Bangladeshi games.

His record-breaking success earned him a man of the match award in that match against New Zealand. Though he got early success with bowl in hand he still considered him as a batsman who can bowl a bit. He first major success with the bat came at one of the historical moments of Bangladesh cricket. In the 100th ODI match of Bangladesh, Ahmed scored his maiden fifty which later proved to be vital as Bangladesh narrowly beat India by 14 runs in that match.

That was also the first home victory for the team. He made an important knock of 81 not out against Zimbabwe to clinch the series at the last game as it hanged 2–2 before the decider match. Bangladesh came back from 2–0 down and won the series to become only the second team to win a five match series after losing the first two games.

In the disappointing Test series against England when Bangladesh first toured England, in 2005, he scored his first Test fifty with 82 runs not out as Bangladesh scored 316 runs in the second innings of the second Test.

He also scored 51 runs in the first ODI against England in the 2005 NatWest Series. In Bangladesh's victory over Australia in 2005, Ahmed scored 23 runs from 17 balls. Again in 2005 when Bangladesh was nearly 60 runs away to register their first victory over Sri Lanka, Aftab came to the crease and made a match winning 50-run partnership with Alok Kapali.

On 16 September 2008 the Bangladesh Cricket Board (BCB) announced a ten-year ban for Aftab along with 13 other Bangladeshi cricketer for joining the unauthorised Indian Cricket League. However Aftab then quit the ICL and re-joined the Bangladesh national cricket team with his first assignment being against England in 2010. He is now retired from international and domestic cricket.

In Bangladesh's first match in the 2007 ICC World Twenty20 championship, Aftab smashed an unbeaten 62 runs off 49 balls as he and Mohammad Ashraful made a 109 run stand to beat the West Indies with 2 overs to spare. In their second match vs the South Africans he scored top with 36 runs off 14 balls before he was bowled out by Morné Morkel.

In 2010, he was left out of the Bangladesh squad for 2010 Asia Cup after he scored only 52 runs at an average of 17.33 in three matches against England. He got just one opportunity in the World Twenty20 but was dismissed for 1 run against Australia. After this he was never selected in Bangladesh squad.

In August 2014, he announced his retirement from all forms of cricket after 2014/15 domestic season to focus on coaching. This came after his poor form in Dhaka Premier League and first-class season where he averaged 23.81 for Gazi Tank and 18.20 in three first-class games. For the 2014 Dhaka Premier League, he played for Brothers Union.

== Criticisms ==
Aftab Ahmed is criticised for not taking time at the crease and often regarded as immature in Tests. But he was determined to plunge forward with his own style. He insisted, "If I do not have the ability to play Test cricket, I would not but I also want to say I will achieve that quality. But not by changing my own style."

== Sponsorship ==
In March 2006 Aftab signed a contract with PHP Group a well-known industrial group in Bangladesh to be their official brand ambassador.

== Career highlights ==
=== Tests ===
Test Debut: vs New Zealand, MA Aziz, 2004

- got his highest score of 82n.o. in Test cricket against England, Chester-le-Street, 2005

=== ODIs ===
ODI Debut: vs South Africa, Birmingham, 2004–2005

- made his highest score of 81n.o. against Zimbabwe, Bangabandhu, 2004–2005
- his best bowling figure of 5/31 came against New Zealand, Bangabandhu
