= Ziaur Rashid =

Bangladeshi cricketer (born 1968)

Personal information
- Full name: Qazi Mohammad Ziaur Rashid
- Born: March 19, 1968 (age 58); Jessore, Khulna
- Batting: Right-handed
- Bowling: Right-arm off-break
- Source: ESPNcricinfo, 18 June 2019

Ziaur Rashid (born 19 March 1968) better known as Rupam who played for Biman Bangladesh Airlines in first-class or List A matches during the 2000–01 season, the only one in which the team was functioning at the highest level of Bangladeshi cricket. He made his first class debut for Chittagong Division in the 2000/01 season.

== See also ==
- List of Chittagong Division cricketers
- List of Biman Bangladesh Airlines cricketers
