= Jahangir Alam Talukdar =

Bangladeshi cricketer (born 1968)

Personal information
- Born: 4 December 1968 (age 57); Dacca, East Pakistan (present-day Dhaka, Bangladesh)
- Batting: Right-handed
- Bowling: Left-arm medium

International information
- National side: Bangladesh
- ODI debut (cap 22): 30 April 1990 v Australia
- Last ODI: 25 December 1990 v India

Career statistics
Competition	ODI
Matches	2
Runs scored	7
Batting average	–
100s/50s	0/0
Top score	7*
Balls bowled	42
Wickets	0
Bowling average	–
5 wickets in innings	–
10 wickets in match	–
Best bowling	–
Catches/stumpings	0/–
- Source: Cricinfo, 13 February 2006

Mohammad Jahangir Alam Talukdar (born 4 December 1968) is a former Bangladeshi cricketer who played in two One Day Internationals in 1990.

A left-arm fast bowler (commonly called Dulu), he first played for the Bangladesh side in a three-day match against Pakistan in January 1986. But it was only from the 1989–90 season that he started to appear regularly at international level. His 3/29 helped BCCB (White) defeat the Indian team Deccan Blues at Mymensingh in January 1990. He was a key performer in the 4th ICC Trophy tournament in the Netherlands in 1990. There he shared the new ball with another left-arm fast bowler, Gholam Nousher. Dulu's best performance came in the second round. His 3/27 against Denmark and 2/24 against Canada helped Bangladesh win vital matches. In December 1992, Dulu took 3/19 against Sri Lanka A, at Dhaka, in the 1st SAARC cricket tournament. He also played in the 5th ICC Trophy tournament in Kenya.

Apart from being a fast medium bowler, Jahangir Alam Talukdar was an unorthodox but effective lower-order right-hand batsman.
