= ICC Men's Test Team Rankings =

Test cricket ranking system

- Administrator: International Cricket Council
- Creation: 2003 (as ICC Test Championship)
- Number of teams: 12
- Current top ranking: South Africa (124 ratings)
- Longest cumulative top ranking: Australia (121 months)
- Longest continuous top ranking: Australia (74 months)
- Highest rating: Australia (143 rating)
- Last updated on: 31 oct 2025.

The ICC Men's Test Team Rankings (formerly known as the ICC Test Championship) is an international rankings system of the International Cricket Council for the 12 teams that play Test cricket. The rankings are based on international matches that are otherwise played as part of regular Test cricket scheduling, with no consideration of home or away status.

After every Test series, the two teams involved receive points based on a mathematical formula involving both teams' previous rating and the result of the series. Each team's points total from matches over the last 3–4 years is divided by a figure based on their total number of matches and series played, to give a "rating".

A drawn match between higher and lower rated teams will benefit the lower-rated team at the expense of the higher-rated team. An "average" team that wins as often as it loses, while playing a mix of stronger and weaker teams, will have a rating of 100.

The top ranked Test team was previously awarded the ICC Test Championship mace, until the inauguration of ICC World Test Championship. From 2003 to 2019, the mace was transferred whenever a new team moved to the top of the rating list. The team that was top of the ratings table on 1 April each year also won a cash prize.

== Current rankings ==
ICC Men's Test Team Rankings
Team	Matches	Points	Rating
South Africa	23	2,860	124
Australia	31	3,787	122
New Zealand	22	2,326	106
India	29	3042	105
England	36	3,658	102
West Indies	30	2,339	78
Sri Lanka	19	1,434	75
Bangladesh	28	2,038	73
Pakistan	23	1,623	71
Zimbabwe	16	338	21
Source: ICC Men's Test Team Rankings, 17 November 2026 See points calculations for more details.

Afghanistan and Ireland do not currently have a rating due to not having played the required amount of Tests (8) within the three-year cycle.

== Historical rankings ==
The ICC provides ratings for the end of each month back to June 2003. Until the inauguration of the ICC World Test Championship in 2019, the team leading the ratings at any point were also awarded the Test Championship Mace. A cash prize was given to the team leading the Championship at the start of each April.

The teams that have successively held the highest rating since that date, by whole month periods are:

Team	Start	End	Total months	Cumulative months	Highest rating
Australia	June 2003	August 2009	74	74	143
South Africa	August 2009	November 2009	3	3	122
India	November 2009	August 2011	21	21	125
England	August 2011	August 2012	12	12	125
South Africa	August 2012	May 2014	21	24	135
Australia	May 2014	July 2014	3	77	123
South Africa	July 2014	January 2016	18	42	130
India	January 2016	February 2016	1	22	110
Australia	February 2016	August 2016	6	83	118
India	August 2016	August 2016	1	23	112
Pakistan	August 2016	October 2016	2	2	111
India	October 2016	May 2020	43	66	130
Australia	May 2020	January 2021	8	91	116
New Zealand	January 2021	March 2021	2	2	118
India	March 2021	June 2021	3	69	122
New Zealand	June 2021	December 2021	6	8	126
India	December 2021	January 2022	1	70	124
Australia	January 2022	May 2023	16	107	128
India	May 2023	January 2024	8	78	121
Australia	January 2024	March 2024	2	109	117
India	April 2024	April 2024	1	79	121
Australia	May 2024	October 2026	29	138	131
South Africa	November 2026	Incumbent	1	43	124
Reference: ICC Rankings. Text in italics indicates that the lead is ongoing.

The summary of teams that have held the highest rating from June 2003 to the present by whole month periods are:

Team	Total Months	Highest Rating
Australia	138	143
India	78	130
South Africa	42	135
England	12	125
New Zealand	8	126
Pakistan	2	111
Reference: ICC Historical Rankings

Since the ICC officially began ranking teams in 2003, Australia had dominated the rankings table. However, from 2009, several teams (Australia, South Africa, India, England, New Zealand, and Pakistan) have competed for the top positions.

The ICC retrospectively applied the current rating system to results since 1952 (providing ratings for the end of each month from then). The table only begins then, as prior to 1952 there is insufficient data available due to the infrequency of matches and the small number of competing teams in these earlier periods.

The teams that have successively held the highest rating from January 1952 until May 2003, by whole month periods are:

Team	Start	End	Total months	Cumulative months
Australia	January 1952	May 1955	41	41
England	June 1955	February 1958	33	33
Australia	March 1958	July 1958	5	46
England	August 1958	December 1958	5	38
Australia	January 1959	December 1963	60	106
West Indies	January 1964	December 1968	60	60
South Africa	January 1969	December 1969	12	12
England	January 1970	January 1973	37	75
Australia	February 1973	March 1973	2	108
India	April 1973	June 1974	15	15
Australia	July 1974	January 1978	43	151
West Indies	February 1978	January 1979	12	72
England	February 1979	August 1980	19	94
India	September 1980	February 1981	6	21
West Indies	March 1981	July 1988	89	161
Pakistan	August 1988	September 1988	2	2
West Indies	October 1988	January 1991	28	189
Australia	February 1991	April 1991	3	154
West Indies	May 1991	July 1992	15	204
Australia	August 1992	January 1993	6	160
West Indies	February 1993	August 1995	31	235
India	September 1995	November 1995	3	24
Australia	December 1995	July 1999	44	204
South Africa	August 1999	December 1999	5	17
Australia	January 2000	February 2000	2	206
South Africa	March 2000	March 2000	1	18
Australia	April 2000	July 2001	16	222
South Africa	August 2001	August 2001	1	19
Australia	September 2001	May 2003	21	243
Reference: ICC Historical Rankings

The summary of teams that have held the highest rating from 1952 to the present by whole month periods are:

Team	Total months	Highest rating
Australia	378	143
West Indies	235	135
England	106	125
India	102	130
South Africa	61	135
New Zealand	8	126
Pakistan	4	111
Reference: ICC Historical Rankings

== Test Mace ==
=== ICC Test Championship (2003–2019) ===
Teams winning the annual prize for topping the ratings table on 1 April each year.

Year	Team	Captain	Ref.
2003	Australia (7)	Adam Gilchrist	
2004	Australia (7)	Ricky Ponting	
2005	Australia (7)	Ricky Ponting	
2006	Australia (7)	Ricky Ponting	
2007	Australia (7)	Ricky Ponting	
2008	Australia (7)	Ricky Ponting	
2009	Australia (7)	Ricky Ponting	
2010	India (2)	MS Dhoni	
2011	India (2)	MS Dhoni	
2012	England	Alastair Cook	
2013	South Africa (3)	Graeme Smith	
2014	South Africa (3)	Graeme Smith	
2015	South Africa (3)	Hashim Amla	
2016	Australia (8)	Steve Smith	
2017	India (5)	Virat Kohli	
2018	India (5)	Virat Kohli	
2019	India (5)	Virat Kohli	

=== ICC World Test Championship (2019–present) ===
The Mace is now awarded to the winners of the World Test Championship.

== Calculations ==
=== Qualifying matches ===
Matches that qualify are those played as part of a series consisting of at least two Tests.

=== Time period ===
Each team scores points based on the results of their matches over the last 3−4 years − the matches played in the 12–24 months since the May before last, plus the matches played in the 24 months before that, for which the matches played and points earned both count half. For example:

	May 2010	May 2011	May 2012	May 2013	May 2014	May 2015
Between May 2013 and April 2014:		Results that were achieved during this period have 50% weighting		Results that were achieved during this period have 100% weighting		
Between May 2014 and April 2015:			Results that were achieved during this period have 50% weighting		Results that were achieved during this period have 100% weighting	

Each May, the matches and points earned between 3 and 4 years ago are removed, and the matches and points earned between 1 and 2 years ago switch from 100% weighting to 50% weighting. For example, on 1 May 2014, the matches played between May 2010 and April 2011 were removed, and the matches played between May 2012 and April 2013 switched to 50% weighting (the matches from May 2011 to April 2012 would have already been at 50% following the previous rerating). This happens overnight, so can result in teams changing positions in the ranking table despite no one playing.

=== Find the points earned from a series ===
Each time two teams complete another series, the rankings tables is updated as described below, based on the ratings of the teams immediately before they played.

==== Step 1. Find the series points for each team ====
- Award 1 point to a team for each match won.
- Award 1/2 point to a team for each match drawn or tied.
- Award 1 bonus point to the team winning the series.
- Award 1/2 bonus point to each team if the series is drawn.

==== Step 2. Convert these series points to actual ratings points ====
If the gap between the ratings of the two teams before the series was less than 40 points

The ratings points for each team equals:

(The team's own series points) x (The opponent's rating + 50) $+$ (The opponent's series points) x (The opponent's rating − 50)

As each match won earns a team 1 series point and their opponent 0, losing earns them 0 series points and their opponent 1, and drawing earns both teams 1/2 series point, each match played therefore earns teams ratings points as follows:

Single match result	Ratings points earned
Win	Opponent's rating + 50
Draw or tie	Opponent's rating
Lose	Opponent's rating − 50

As this formula only applies when the gap between the ratings of the two teams at the start of the series was less than 40 points, winning a match will always earn a team more rating points than the rating they already had, and losing a match will always earn a team fewer rating points than the rating they already had. Drawing a match will earn the weaker team more rating points than the rating they already had, and the stronger team fewer.

The difference between winning and losing a single match is therefore 100 points. Also, whether the outcome of a match is a win & lose or a draw, the total rating points earned by the two teams from that match will be the sum of the two teams' ratings before the series began. The total rating points earned from a series will therefore equal the sum of the two teams' ratings before the series began multiplied by (the number of matches + 1).

If the gap between the ratings of the two teams before the series was at least 40 points

The ratings points for the stronger team equals:

(The team's own series points) x (The team's own rating + 10) $+$ (The opponent's series points) x (The team's own rating − 90)

and the ratings points for the weaker team equals:

(The team's own series points) x (The team's own rating + 90) $+$ (The opponent's series points) x (The team's own rating − 10).

As above, each match played therefore earns teams ratings points as follows:

Single match result	Ratings points earned
Stronger team wins	Own rating + 10
Weaker team loses	Own rating − 10
Stronger team draws or ties	Own rating − 40
Weaker team draws or ties	Own rating + 40
Stronger team loses	Own rating − 90
Weaker team wins	Own rating + 90

Therefore, again, winning a match will always earn a team more rating points than the rating they already had, and losing a match will always earn a team fewer rating points than the rating they already had. Drawing a match will earn the weaker team more points than the rating they already had, and the stronger team fewer.

For both teams, the difference between winning and losing a single match is still 100 points. Also, whichever of the three outcomes happens, the total rating points earned by the two teams from that match will be the sum of the two teams' ratings before the series began.

=== Update the ranking table ===
For each team:

- Add the ratings points scored to their total ratings points already scored (in previous matches).
- Update the number of matches played by adding the number of Series points available. This is one more than the number of games in the series, as there is an additional point available for the series winner (a two Test match series will result in the match count getting incremented by three).
- Divide the new rating points total by the updated number of matches to get the updated Rating.

=== Example ===
Suppose two teams, initially with ratings of 120 and 90, play a 3-match series, and the team with the higher initial rating wins 2–1:

Team	Ratings before the series			The series				Ratings after the series		
Team	Matches	Points	Rating	Matches won	Matches drawn	Series points	Ratings points	Matches	Points	Rating
A	30	3600	120	2	0	3	3x(90+50) + 1x(90–50) = 460	30+3+1=34	3600+460=4060	119.4
B	36	3240	90	1	0	1	1x(120+50) + 3x(120–50) = 380	36+3+1=40	3240+380=3620	90.5

- The total Ratings points available from the series (460+380=840) is the same as the initial ratings of the teams multiplied by the number of Series points available ((120+90)x4=840).
- The two teams' total ratings is almost exactly the same after the series (119.4+90.5=209.9) as before the series (120+90=210). The series has therefore not generated any extra ratings, but has just redistributed the ratings the two teams already had. When these ratings are published in the official table in their rounded form (119 and 91), the total ratings after the series will be exactly the same as before the series. There is therefore no points 'inflation' in this system, which means that comparisons of ratings over time are meaningful.
- Despite winning the series, Team A's rating has reduced, and despite losing the series, Team B's rating has increased. If Team A had won the series 3–0 then its rating would have increased to 122.4.

== See also ==
- ICC Men's ODI Team Rankings
- ICC Men's T20I Team Rankings
- ICC Women's ODI and T20I rankings
