= Habibul Bashar =

Bangladeshi cricketer

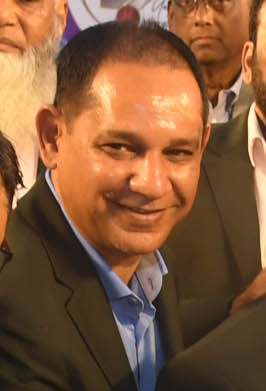
- Bashar in 2025

Personal information
- Full name: Qazi Habibul Bashar
- Born: 17 August 1972 (age 54); Nagakanda, Kushtia, Bangladesh
- Batting: Right-handed
- Bowling: Right-arm offbreak
- Role: Top-order batsman

International information
- National side: Bangladesh (1995–2008)
- Test debut (cap 4): 10 November 2000 v India
- Last Test: 22 February 2008 v South Africa
- ODI debut (cap 29): 6 April 1995 v Sri Lanka
- Last ODI: 12 May 2007 v India
- ODI shirt no.: 7 (previously 5)

Domestic team information
- Years: Team
- 2000–2001: Biman Bangladesh Airlines
- 2003–2010: Khulna Division

Career statistics
| Competition | Test | ODI | FC | LA |
|---|---|---|---|---|
| Matches | 50 | 111 | 91 | 156 |
| Runs scored | 3,026 | 2,168 | 5,571 | 3,418 |
| Batting average | 30.87 | 21.68 | 33.76 | 24.41 |
| 100s/50s | 3/24 | 0/14 | 7/41 | 0/24 |
| Top score | 113 | 78 | 224 | 83 |
| Balls bowled | 282 | 175 | 814 | 670 |
| Wickets | 0 | 1 | 8 | 8 |
| Bowling average | – | 142.00 | 65.87 | 62.37 |
| 5 wickets in innings | – | 0 | 0 | 0 |
| 10 wickets in match | – | 0 | 0 | 0 |
| Best bowling | – | 1/31 | 2/28 | 2/17 |
| Catches/stumpings | 22/– | 26/– | 40/– | 33/– |
- Source: ESPNcricinfo, 25 January 2019

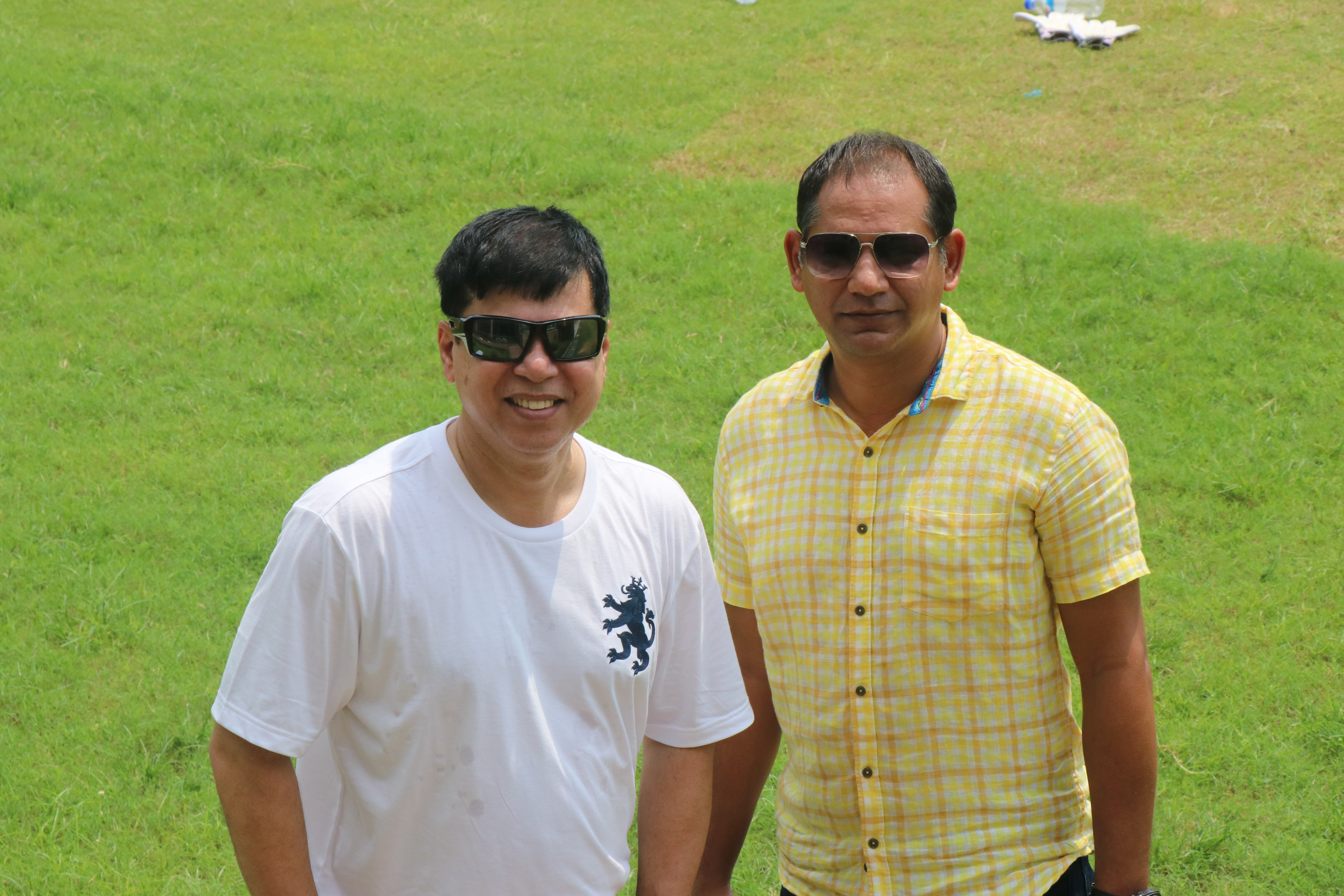
Minhajul Abedin and Habibul Bashar on field as selectors of BCB

Qazi Habibul Bashar (Bengali: কাজী হাবিবুল বাশার; born 17 August 1972) is a Bangladeshi cricket administrator and former cricketer who played as a right-handed batter for the Bangladesh national team from 1995 to 2008. He has served as the team's chief selector since March 2026. By the time of his retirement, he held several national batting records in both Test and One Day International (ODI) formats. He served as the captain of the national team from 2004 to 2007.

== Early career ==
In 1989, Habibul Bashar played for the Bangladesh Under-19 team in the U-19 Asia Cup. Through the 1990s he played his domestic cricket for Biman Bangladesh Airlines. His ODI debut came at the 1995 Asia Cup against Sri Lanka. He missed the 1997 ICC Trophy, in which Bangladesh were the champions but did play in the Asia Cup of that year. He was also left out of the 1999 World Cup squad. After the World Cup he again entered the team and with Eddie Barlow's inspiration he got the chance to play more.

Keeping up with the traditional inconsistency with announcing the side, Habibul Bashar was again out of the team for Bangladesh's inaugural test. His consistent performance before the test drew the attention of the press and after heavy criticism from them he was finally included in the side. Habibul Bashar made the first fifty in the history of Bangladesh Test cricket to prove his ability.

== Career story ==
Habibul Bashar was one of Bangladesh's leading batsmen. He was the captain of Bangladesh from January 2004 to June 2007, during this time he led the team to some notable successes. When Zimbabwe toured Bangladesh in January 2005, Bangladesh recorded their first Test match win, their first Test series win, and their first One Day International series win. In June 2005, Bangladesh beat the world champions Australia in a One Day International in Cardiff. In April 2006, they came close to beating Australia in a Test match, taking a first-innings lead of 158, eventually losing by three wickets. Bangladesh lost the ODI series with Zimbabwe in August 2006 by 3–2, but beat them in the last qualifying match of the Champions Trophy. Thanks to these efforts, Bangladesh are currently above Zimbabwe in the LG ICC ODI rankings, and showing that they are improving by the match.

Habibul Bashar had a disappointing 2007 World Cup as a batsman, with an average of only 13.12 and a highest score of 32. In spite of this, Bangladesh performed relatively well. Following a 1–0 test series defeat to India, Habibul Bashar resigned as ODI captain but wanted to remain part of the ODI team. However, despite stating that he wanted to continue to be test captain, Habibul Bashar was removed from this position on 2 June 2007 and replaced by Mohammad Ashraful who also took over as ODI captain. On 14 September, he announced his retirement from international cricket. Then he became the captain of the Dhaka Warriors side in ICL.At the end of 2009 he retired from ICL and came back at the mainstream of Bangladesh cricket. He has retired from all forms of professional cricket after playing the 2009/10 season. Currently he is playing in the local weekend cricket tournament for The Josephite Warriors. Bashar was also a national Goodwill Ambassador for UNICEF in Bangladesh. On 20 January 2022, Habibul Bashar joined Asia Lions along with Mohammad Rafique in Legends League Cricket.

== 2017 Champions Trophy ==
Habibul Bashar set to represent Bangladesh as the brand ambassador during the 2017 ICC Champions Trophy.

== Career milestones ==
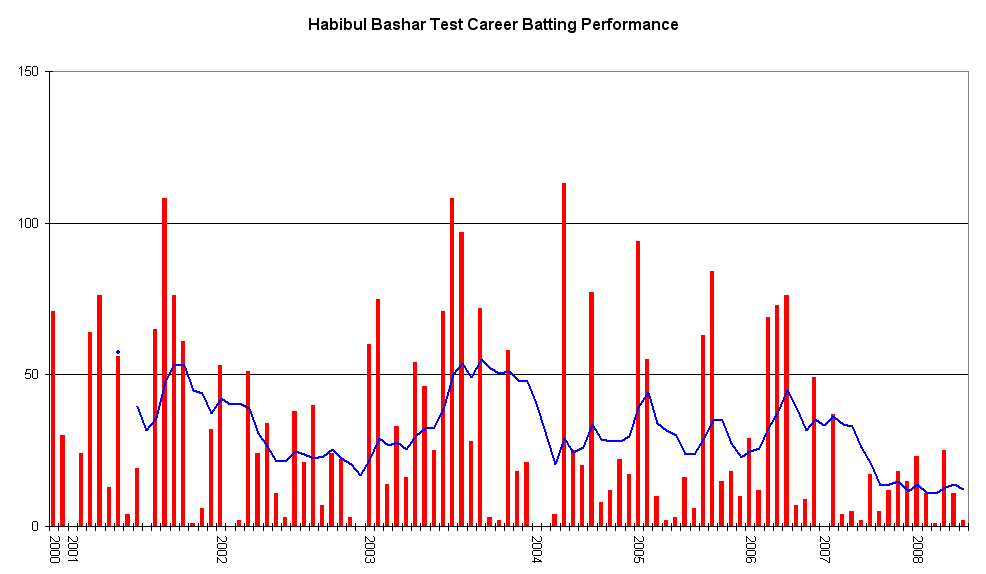
An innings-by-innings breakdown of Habibul Bashar's Test match batting career, showing runs scored (red bars) and the average of the last ten innings (blue line).

=== Tests ===
Test Debut: vs India, Dhaka in 2000

- He made his highest score of 113 in Test cricket against West Indies in 2004
- Test Centuries:

1. 108 vs Zimbabwe, Chattogram in 2001

2. 108 vs Pakistan, Karachi in 2003

3. 113 vs West Indies, Gros Islet in 2004

- Bashar's most prolific form was in 2003 where he scored 801 runs with 1 century & 7 fifties, averaging 44.50

Nasim and Galib Record Partnership of 227 Runs in Vhuter Goli, Kadamtala

=== ODIs ===
ODI Debut: vs Sri Lanka, Sharjah in 1995

- He made his highest score of 78 in ODI's against Zimbabwe in 2007

| Preceded by Khaled Mashud | Bangladesh national cricket captain 2004/5–2007 | Succeeded by Mohammad Ashraful |
