= Gholam Nousher =

Bangladeshi cricketer (born 1964)

Personal information
- Full name: Gholam Mohammad Nousher
- Born: 6 October 1964 (age 62); Dacca, East Pakistan
- Nickname: Prince
- Batting: Left-handed
- Bowling: Left-arm medium
- Role: Bowler

International information
- National side: Bangladesh
- ODI debut (cap 2): 31 March 1986 v Pakistan
- Last ODI: 31 December 1990 v Sri Lanka

Career statistics
Competition	ODI
Matches	9
Runs scored	8
Batting average	8.00
100s/50s	–/–
Top score	4
Balls bowled	408
Wickets	5
Bowling average	62.79
5 wickets in innings	0
10 wickets in match	0
Best bowling	1/27
Catches/stumpings	–/–
- Source: Cricinfo, 13 February 2006

Gholam Mohammad Nousher (Bengali: গোলাম মোহাম্মদ নওশের; born 6 October 1964) is a former Bangladeshi cricketer who played in 9 ODIs from 1986 to 1990. He was Bangladesh's main strike bowler during the 2nd half of the 1980s.

== The early years ==
The tall left armer from Mymensingh played for the Bangladesh Tigers (the unofficial youth team) in 1984, and a year later he was playing for the full national side against Sri Lanka. He celebrated his promotion with the big scalp of Ranjan Madugalle. In January 1986, he took the wickets of Ramiz Raja and Shoaib Mohammad.

== In ICC Trophy ==
Though his career was hampered at times by bad injuries, he nevertheless continued on to serve the national side well into the 1990s. He was sorely missed during the 2nd round matches of the 1994 ICC Trophy in Kenya, as he was sidelined by an injury.

Year	Matches	Runs	Wickets	Average	Best
1986	4	129	5	25.80	2/31
1990	7	211	11	19.18	3/26
1994	4	113	8	14.13	4/36
Overall	15	453	24	18.88	4/36
