= Indian cricket team in Zimbabwe in 2005 =

	India	Zimbabwe
- Dates: 9 July – 22 September 2005
Captains	Sourav Ganguly	Tatenda Taibu

Test series
- Result: India won the 2-match series 2–0
Most runs	Rahul Dravid (175)	Andy Blignaut (127)
Most wickets	Irfan Pathan (21)	Heath Streak (6); Blessing Mahwire (6)
- Player of the series: Irfan Pathan (Ind)

The Indian cricket team toured Zimbabwe for cricket matches in August and September 2005. The Indians played in the Videocon Tri-Series in Zimbabwe, winning three of five matches but losing the final to finish second in the three-team tournament, and they played Zimbabwe for two Test matches in September 2005 (the Royal Stag test series). The hosts Zimbabwe were ninth out of ten teams in the ICC Test Championship, with their last win against the top eight Test nations coming in June 2001, against India. They did not manage to win a match here either, as India, led by the performances of fast bowler Irfan Pathan (who took 21 wickets), won the series 2–0 after an innings win in the first Test and a 10-wicket win in the second. India consolidated their third place in the Test championship with the win, which was also their first series win in Zimbabwe in four attempts.

This was also the final Test match contested in Zimbabwe before the team was suspended from Test cricket.

== Squads ==
- India: Sourav Ganguly (captain), Dinesh Karthik (wicket-keeper) Ajit Agarkar, Lakshmipathy Balaji, Rahul Dravid, Gautam Gambhir, Harbhajan Singh, Dheeraj Jadhav, Mohammad Kaif, Zaheer Khan, Anil Kumble, VVS Laxman, Irfan Pathan, Virender Sehwag, Yuvraj Singh
- Zimbabwe: Tatenda Taibu (captain and wicket-keeper), Andy Blignaut, Charles Coventry, Keith Dabengwa, Terry Duffin, Dion Ebrahim, Blessing Mahwire, Hamilton Masakadza, Waddington Mwayenga, Heath Streak, Brendan Taylor, Prosper Utseya, Sean Williams

== Schedule ==
Date	Match	Venue
September; 8–10	Zim Board XI v Ind, non-FC warm-up	Mutare
13–17	Zim v Ind, 1st Test	Bulawayo
20–24	Zim v Ind, 2nd Test	Harare

== ODI series ==
India won three of five matches in this tournament, beating Zimbabwe twice in the group stage (by 161 runs and four wickets), and New Zealand once, but they lost the final and thus finished second out of the three teams.

== First-class leg ==
=== Tour match: Zimbabwe Board XI v India, 8–10 September ===
Match drawn

Dion Ebrahim fought off the bowling efforts of Zaheer Khan, Lakshmipathy Balaji and Anil Kumble to make 169 for Zimbabwe Board XI against India – the only Zimbabwean top-order batsman to pass 20, although number nine Keith Dabengwa made 60. Zimbabwe declared on 294 for 9, Kumble having taken five for 48, while Khan and Balaji leaked runs. Then, Virender Sehwag, Gautam Gambhir and Rahul Dravid made centuries, and India eased to 572 for 9, with Graeme Cremer picking up four wickets. Balaji picked up the wicket of Terry Duffin for 0, but Hamilton Masakadza and Brendan Taylor added 96 as Zimbabwe batted out for the draw.

=== First Test: India v Zimbabwe, 13–16 September ===
13–17 September 2005 (Note: While five days of play were scheduled for each Test, this Test reached a result in four days.)
Scorecard

Zimbabwe	v	India
279 (98.5 overs); Tatenda Taibu 71* (158); Irfan Pathan 5/58 (18.5 overs)		554 (151.3 overs); V. V. S. Laxman 140 (221); Blessing Mahwire 4/92 (25.3 overs)
185 (47.5 overs); Tatenda Taibu 52 (83); Irfan Pathan 4/53 (12 overs)

India won by an innings and 90 runs
Queens Sports Club, Bulawayo
Umpires: Aleem Dar (Pak) and Daryl Harper (Aus)
Player of the match: Irfan Pathan (Ind)

- Zimbabwe won the toss and elected to bat.

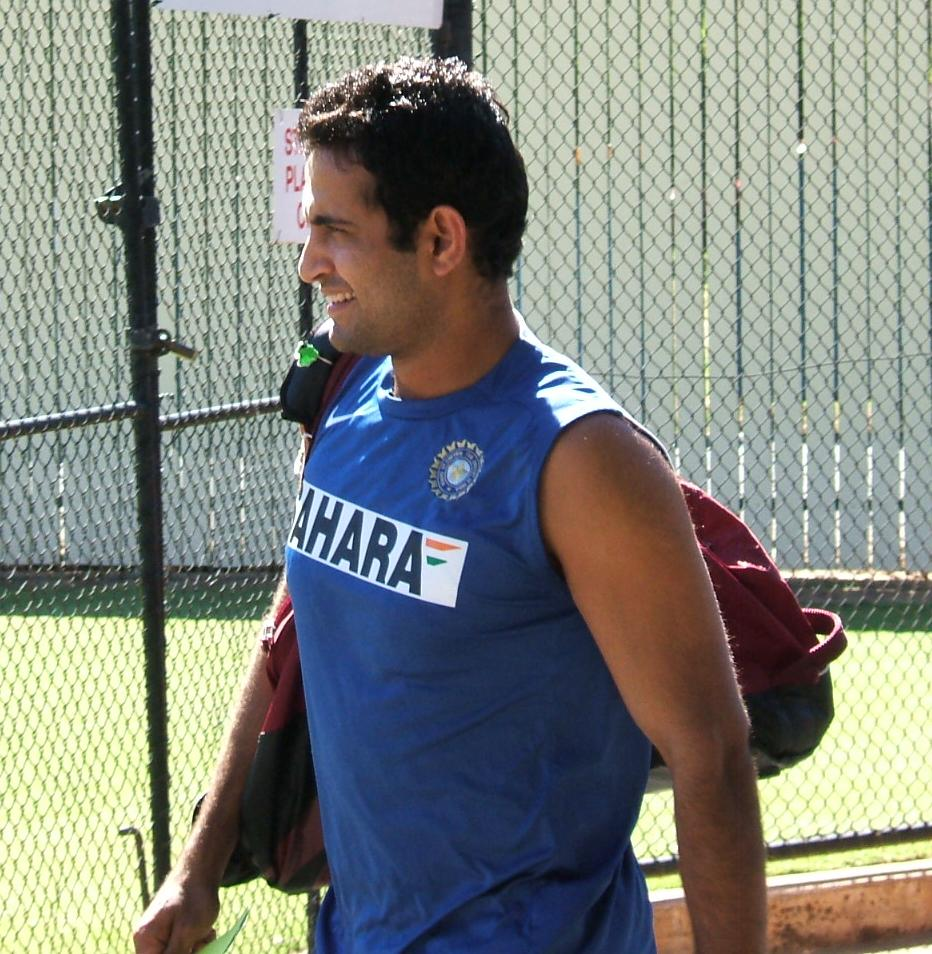
Irfan Pathan

Zimbabwe battled well on the first day of the two-Test series with India, as opening batsman Terry Duffin survived early jitters to become the first Zimbabwean to make a half-century on debut since Stuart Matsikenyeri, while the team made their highest score since the tour of Bangladesh last season. Duffin and Brendan Taylor started reasonably well, adding 25 before Taylor inside edged onto his pad and the ball popped up to Gautam Gambhir who took a good catch. Hamilton Masakadza stepped in, and looked quite settled before gloving the ball down the leg side to the wicket-keeper for 14. Dion Ebrahim survived with Duffin until lunch, however, as Zimbabwe made their way to 75 for 2.

After lunch, Zimbabwe fought back, with Duffin hitting some technically sound boundaries. They brought up 100 in just over five overs after lunch, with no further loss, but Duffin was eventually dismissed lbw for 56 – out to a trademark inswinger from Irfan Pathan. Pathan got another wicket in his next over, as Dion Ebrahim was caught and bowled, and suddenly Zimbabwe could be looking at a familiar collapse, with the score 124 for 4.

The current and former captains of the Zimbabwe team, Tatenda Taibu and Heath Streak, had other thoughts, however. The pair added 70 in a fine rearguard effort, while not rejecting the odd high-scoring shot either, and frustrated the Indian bowlers for 25 overs. Eventually it was India's most experienced bowler, 34-year-old Anil Kumble, who broke the defences – Streak couldn't quite read the turn of the ball correctly, and was caught for 27. Kumble also dismissed young Charles Coventry for 2, leaving Taibu with all-rounder Andy Blignaut.

Blignaut was strangely subdued for the 33 deliveries he faced, and although he did attempt some ODI-style heaves, they mostly missed both his bat and the off stump. Blignaut was eventually lbw for 4, but Keith Dabengwa came to the rescue with an entertaining 35 to bat out the day. He yielded a catch to VVS Laxman at first slip off Irfan Pathan in the second over of the morning, however, as Zimbabwe only managed to add ten to their overnight score for the loss of three wickets. Pathan was the pick of the Indian bowlers, swinging the ball well to dismiss Gavin Ewing and Blessing Mahwire as well, as Zimbabwe were all out for 279 – with Tatenda Taibu left not out for 71.

However, in sunny conditions and on a good batting track, India found the going very easy. Admittedly Dabengwa dropped a hard catch off Virender Sehwag on 5, and Sehwag made the Zimbabweans pay, pounding six fours and one six in a 44 before Mahwire found a way through his defences at the stroke of lunch. India had added 88 for the first wicket, however, and although Gautam Gambhir departed for 46 shortly after lunch, the foundation was laid down. Rahul Dravid was back to his form from before the one-day series, and VVS Laxman also survived a tricky period to hit his eighth Test century. Mahwire added yet another wicket to his tally, as he lured Dravid into an edge that fell into Brendan Taylor's hands, but Laxman pounded Zimbabwe's bowlers in the evening session, giving them a relatively comfortable lead of 46 runs at stumps on day two.

Zimbabwe had a good morning session on the third day, by their standards, as Laxman was run out for 140 and Yuvraj Singh and Dinesh Karthik were dismissed in successive overs. Captain Ganguly, however, held together well with the lower order, and he notched up the half-century along with his 5000th Test run before lunch, and India battled out the morning session with no further loss. And in the afternoon session, India's spinners took some beating. Dabengwa and Ewing bowled all but one over of the 37-over long session, despite Irfan Pathan defying the bowlers for 52 and Ganguly nurdling his way to 97 before tea, as Taibu seemed content with Ewing tying down the runs. He did not even do that very efficiently – by tea, his bowling analysis read 38–5–111–0, but he got a breakthrough three overs into the evening as the Indian captain smashed the ball straight to Dabengwa for 101. By the time, however, the Indian score had soared past 500, and in a frantic 40-ball feast at the end Harbhajan Singh, Zaheer Khan and Anil Kumble combined to add 52 for the last two wickets.

The hosts did not put up as much fight in the second innings as in the first, however. During the course of 45 minutes, Irfan Pathan had removed four Zimbabwean batsmen – Taylor made 4, Masakadza 2, Ebrahim 2 and Streak a golden duck. Duffin, the discovery of the first innings, was also dismissed by Zaheer for 2. Only Taibu seemed vaguely comfortable against the swing bowler, and his partnership with Coventry at least added 49 runs on the board. However, in the last scheduled over of the day, Coventry gave a catch to Gambhir off Harbhajan Singh, resulting in Harbhajan's 200th Test wicket. Zimbabwe thus needed 208 for their last four wickets to avoid the innings defeat.

Zimbabwe resisted for a session on the fourth day against the Indian spinners, but Harbhajan and Anil Kumble chipped away with wickets, first by removing Blignaut for a well-struck 26, and then Taibu and Dabengwa in quick succession. Needing only one more wicket for the win, India attacked, but the fielder at short leg dropped Gavin Ewing early on and he answered by smashing the spin bowlers around. Ewing and Mahwire added 47 runs in 13 overs before Harbhajan finally got a ball to spin back into Ewing's pads – gone for 34, but at least he got a somewhat useful score. Nevertheless, Zimbabwe were all out for 185, and they suffered yet another innings defeat.

=== Second Test, Zimbabwe v India, 20–22 September ===
20–24 September 2005 (Note: While five days of play were scheduled for each Test, this Test reached a result in three days.)

Zimbabwe	v	India
161 (44.2 overs); Charles Coventry 37 (32); Irfan Pathan 7/59 (15.2 overs)		386 (107.3 overs); Rahul Dravid 118 (237); Heath Streak 6/73 (32 overs)
243 (55 overs); Andy Blignaut 100* (113); Irfan Pathan 5/67 (19 overs)		19/0 (2.2 overs); Virender Sehwag 14* (11)

India won by 10 wickets
Harare Sports Club, Harare
Umpires: Aleem Dar (Pak) and Daryl Harper (Aus)
Player of the match: Irfan Pathan (Ind)

- India won the toss and elected to field.

Zimbabwe made one change from the previous Test, exchanging Ewing for Test debutante Waddington Mwayenga, gave the Indian slip fielders and wicket-keeper a lot of practice during the first morning of the second Test of the series, as four catches went to hand during the first 69 balls of the match. It started with Brendan Taylor, who edged to Rahul Dravid with the third delivery of the match, out for 4. Terry Duffin and Dion Ebrahim showed more patience, lasting for ten overs, but once Irfan Pathan found Duffin's outside edge Zimbabwe lost three wickets for no runs. Captain Tatenda Taibu, who had been top-scorer in both innings in the last Test, made a two-ball duck, while Dion Ebrahim was caught behind off Zaheer Khan, Zaheer's first wicket in the match. Heath Streak and Hamilton Masakadza survived for fifteen overs – four of them bowled by captain Sourav Ganguly, testing his skills with the swinging ball – but Streak eventually edged a ball from Harbhajan onto his pads and into the hands of Gautam Gambhir, leaving Zimbabwe at 75 for 5 at lunch.

Pathan continued the rout after the break, helped by Harbhajan, who snared Coventry for Zimbabwe's best score of the innings, a typical stroke-filled 37, including four fours and a six. After his nine-wicket-haul in the first match that left him with Man of the Match honours, Pathan now removed Masakadza, Blignaut, Dabengwa and Mahwire, to end with career best figures of seven for 59. Zimbabwe's innings had lasted 44.2 overs, yielded 161 runs (the Test debutant Mwayenga contributing with 14 not out from number 11) and included eight catches and two lbws.

India's innings was as easy as it had been a week ago. From the first 12 overs, Sehwag and Gambhir added 75 runs, before Sehwag edged Streak behind for a run-a-ball 44. Gambhir continued, though, and India lost no further wickets until the close of play, leaving them on 195 for 1 with Gambhir five runs short of his second Test century. Rahul Dravid was more subdued, only making 49 from 103 balls, and he was occasionally troubled by Streak – but not enough to surrender his wicket.

Zimbabwe had better luck on day two, as the removal of Gautam Gambhir fifteen balls into the morning incited a return to accurate line and length bowling. The run rate was slow for today's Test cricket, as India accumulated only 2.46 runs per over in the first two sessions, including a period of 14 overs without a single boundary. India went defensive after losing Laxman for 8, and Dravid and Ganguly ground out the runs – only for Ganguly to depart for 16 shortly before lunch, giving Mwayenga his first Test wicket. Dravid and Yuvraj Singh pushed gently onwards after the break, adding 61 in 21 overs, but the new ball, delivered from the hands of Streak and Mahwire, caused them to miss the ball often. Eventually, Streak had Yuvraj Singh bowled with a fine inswinger, and Dravid followed two balls later, clean bowled by Mahwire for 98.

Streak bowled an unbroken 14-over spell from the 80-over mark, with only the 15-minute tea break as respite, but the spell yielded a further three wickets – Pathan added another typically belligerent 32 before Charles Coventry held a catch, while wicket-keeper Dinesh Karthik and Anil Kumble were both out in single figures, and Andy Blignaut ended the innings by dismissing Zaheer. Despite taking the last eight wickets for 200 runs – respectable by most measure – Zimbabwe had surrendered a 205-run lead, and their batting was not up to close that gap.

Irfan Pathan was keen to emulate Streak's feat with the new ball, and he did, removing openers Duffin and Taylor to reach 18 wickets for the series. Zaheer, meanwhile, induced two catches in the gully as Zimbabwe lost the first four wickets for 21 runs. Masakadza and Streak survived until the close of play, adding a further 18, but the further 166 runs required to have India bat again looked enormous.

Streak was dismissed early in the morning, but spirited innings from Coventry and Blignaut, along with Masakadza's third Test fifty, delayed the result somewhat, preventing Zimbabwe from suffering their sixth successive innings defeat. Coventry added a belligerent 25 before holing out to Ganguly at midwicket, while Blignaut was the beneficiary of five dropped chances by the Indian fielders – including three in an over bowled by Zaheer Khan. At the other end, however, the 22-year-old Masakadza composed 71, his highest Test score for four years and his third-highest score overall. Masakadza and Blignaut raced away, adding 151 before lunch, and they took the score to 201 for 6 before an all too familiar collapse struck. Masakadza started it, trapped lbw by Pathan, and Dabengwa and Mahwire both went for ducks. Zimbabwe needed three runs to avoid the innings defeat, and once they were provided, Blignaut started swinging. He hit two sixes after the departure of Mahwire, but debutant Mwayenga deserted him, lbw to Zaheer for 1.

Needing 20 to win, India hardly needed the 15-minute innings break – they wrapped it up with 14 deliveries, as they were handed the game with four leg side byes from Blignaut. Sehwag had hit three fours in a routine unbeaten 14 as India made it to 20 for no loss with ease. (Cricinfo scorecard)
