= New Zealand cricket team in Zimbabwe in 2005 =

	Zimbabwe	New Zealand
- Dates: 25 July – 6 September 2005
Captains	Tatenda Taibu	Stephen Fleming

Test series
- Result: New Zealand won the 2-match series 2–0
Most runs	Brendan Taylor (124)	Daniel Vettori (175)
Most wickets	Heath Streak (6); Blessing Mahwire (6)	Shane Bond (13)
- Player of the series: Shane Bond (NZ)

The New Zealand cricket team played a controversial tour of Zimbabwe in August and September 2005, including some warm-up matches in Namibia. They played two Test matches against Zimbabwe, and also participated in a triangular One Day International competition with Zimbabwe and India.

== Background ==
Concerns overs human rights violations in Zimbabwe, in particular the slum clearances known as Operation Murambatsvina, prompted calls by the New Zealand's Green Party and human rights advocates including Amnesty International for the cricket team to boycott the tour. The New Zealand Government made it clear that the scheduled return visit of the Zimbabwean cricket team to New Zealand in December 2005 would not occur as entry to New Zealand would be denied to the Zimbabwean players.

The Black Caps were obliged to tour by the International Cricket Council (ICC), and faced a fine of over NZ$3 million if they did not tour. The ICC was asked to waive this fine but refused. It was also claimed that a withdrawal from the tour would greatly harm New Zealand's chances of co-hosting the 2011 World Cup with a potential loss of $NZ20 million. Two opinion polls showed a majority of New Zealanders opposed the tour. The TVNZ/Colmar Brunton poll taken on 30 June found 77 percent opposed, and a Fairfax New Zealand/ACNielsen poll on 18 July showed 53 percent opposed, (NZ Herald). Parliament voted with a substantial majority on 26 July to ask the Black Caps to abandon the tour. Only ACT and the Māori Party voted against the resolution. A month ahead of the tour, New Zealand Cricket and the players were unanimous in their decision of willing to tour.

The two Tests against Zimbabwe were being followed by a tri-nations One Day International (ODI) series, with India making up the threesome.

== Schedule (Zimbabwe leg) ==
- 4 August : Practice match in Harare
- 7 August: First Test starts (Harare)
- 15 August: Second Test starts (Bulawayo)
- 24 August: 1st ODI New Zealand v Zimbabwe (Bulawayo)
- 26 August: 2nd ODI India v New Zealand (Bulawayo)
- 29 August: 3rd ODI Zimbabwe v India (Harare)
- 31 August: 4th ODI New Zealand v Zimbabwe (Harare)
- 2 September: 5th ODI New Zealand v India (Harare)
- 4 September: 6th ODI Zimbabwe v India (Harare)
- 6 September: Final (Harare)

== Squads ==
Zimbabwe	New Zealand
Tatenda Taibu (c, wk); Heath Streak (vc); Andy Blignaut; Stuart Carlisle; Graeme Cremer; Keith Dabengwa; Dion Ebrahim; Neil Ferreira; Anthony Ireland; Blessing Mahwire; Hamilton Masakadza; Chris Mpofu; Brendan Taylor; Craig Wishart	Stephen Fleming (c); Daniel Vettori (vc); Nathan Astle; Craig Cumming; Lou Vincent; Hamish Marshall; Scott Styris; James Marshall; Brendon McCullum (wk); Jacob Oram; Kyle Mills; James Franklin; Shane Bond; Chris Martin; Paul Wiseman

The New Zealand squad for the tour was announced on 22 June 2005. Shane Bond, who was out of international cricket for two years owing to a back injury, made both Test and ODI squads. Daryl Tuffey and Chris Harris were excluded after failing to recover from their injuries. Spinner Jeetan Patel was the only new inclusion to either team; he made the ODI squad.

Zimbabwe announced their 14-member Test squad on 3 August. Tatenda Taibu was retained as captain and Heath Streak was appointed his deputy.

== Results ==
=== Matches against Namibia ===
==== Namibia v New Zealand, 30 July ====
New Zealand won by 29 runs. Craig Cumming made 116 to lift the tourists to 330 for 6 in their first match at Windhoek against Namibia, a team coming off a disappointing ICC Trophy tournament, where they finished seventh and did not qualify for the 2007 World Cup. In reply, Namibia crashed to 75 for 5, but recovered to 301 all out, despite economical bowling from fast bowler Shane Bond who was returning from injury and took two for 20 in 10 overs. Cricinfo scorecard

==== Namibia v New Zealand, 31 July ====
New Zealand won by 148 runs. The Black Caps batted first again and made 326 for 5. Brendon McCullum scored 84 not out and Nathan Astle an unbeaten 73, to help amass a fine 50 over total. This time, though, the Namibians weren't allowed to get away to a high score, as Shane Bond and Chris Martin took two wickets each and helped them collapse to 178. Daniel Vettori polished off the tail with three for 24. Cricinfo scorecard

=== Test series ===
==== First Test ====
7–11 August (Note: While five days of play were scheduled for each Test, the first Test reached a result in four days.)
Scorecard

New Zealand	v	Zimbabwe
452/9d (89 overs); Daniel Vettori 127 (98); Blessing Mahwire 3/115 (26 overs)		59 (29.4 overs); Stuart Carlisle 20* (66); James Franklin 3/11 (5 overs)
		99 (49.5 overs) (f/o); Hamilton Masakadza 42 (79); Daniel Vettori 4/28 (13.5 overs)

New Zealand won by an innings and 294 runs
Harare Sports Club, Harare
Umpires: Mark Benson (Eng) and Darrell Hair (Aus)
Player of the match: Daniel Vettori (NZ)

- Zimbabwe won the toss and elected to field.
- Neil Ferreira (Zim) made his Test debut.
- Zimbabwe batsman Chris Mpofu recorded identical dismissals in both innings – stumped by Brendon McCullum off the bowling of Daniel Vettori for a duck, after facing 7 deliveries.
- Zimbabwe became only the second team to be dismissed twice in a single day's play since India in 1952.

==== Second Test ====
15–19 August
Scorecard

Zimbabwe	v	New Zealand
231 (79 overs); Tatenda Taibu 76 (157); Shane Bond 6/51 (17 overs)		484 (111.1 overs); Nathan Astle 128 (217); Heath Streak 4/73 (22 overs)
207 (61.1 overs); Brendan Taylor 77 (129); Shane Bond 4/48 (14 overs)

New Zealand won by an innings and 46 runs
Queens Sports Club, Bulawayo
Umpires: Mark Benson (Eng) and Darrell Hair (Aus)
Player of the match: Shane Bond (NZ)

- Zimbabwe won the toss and elected to bat.
- Keith Dabengwa (Zim) made his Test debut.
- Blessing Mahwire scored the fastest half-century by an Zimbabwe player (34 balls).
- Shane Bond surpassed Chris Martin to become the quickest New Zealand bowler to claim 50 wickets (12 Tests).

=== One-day internationals ===
Please see Videocon Tri-Series 2005 for a full treatment of the one-day international matches with Zimbabwe and India.
