= Zimbabwean cricket team in Bangladesh in 2006–07 =

Zimbabwe in Bangladesh in 2006–07
	Zimbabwe	Bangladesh
- Dates: 26 November – 8 December 2006
Captains	Prosper Utseya	Habibul Bashar

One Day International series
- Results: Bangladesh won the 5-match series 5–0
Most runs	Stuart Matsikenyeri (151)	Shahriar Nafees (274)
Most wickets	Gary Brent (7)	Abdur Razzak 12
- Player of the series: Shahriar Nafees (Ban)

Twenty20 International series
- Results: Bangladesh won the 1-match series 1–0
Most runs	Sean Williams (38)	Mashrafe Mortaza (36)
Most wickets	Prosper Utseya (3)	Abdur Razzak (3)
- Player of the series: Mashrafe Mortaza (Ban)

The Zimbabwean cricket team in Bangladesh in 2006–07 played a Twenty20 International match and five One Day International matches. The T20I was the inaugural T20I played by both teams which Bangladesh won by 43 runs and they also whitewashed Zimbabwe in the limited formats by 5–0 margin.

== Squads ==
ODI		T20I	
Bangladesh	Zimbabwe	Bangladesh	Zimbabwe
Habibul Bashar (c); Shahriar Nafees; Abdur Razzak; Aftab Ahmed; Farhad Reza; Khaled Mashud (wk); Mashrafe Mortaza; Mehrab Hossain Jnr; Mohammad Ashraful; Mushfiqur Rahim (wk); Mohammad Rafique; Shahadat Hossain; Shakib Al Hasan; Syed Rasel; Tapash Baisya; Tushar Imran	Prosper Utseya (c); Brendan Taylor (wk); Gary Brent; Chamu Chibhabha; Elton Chigumbura; Graeme Cremer; Keith Dabengwa; Ryan Higgins; Anthony Ireland; Blessing Mahwire; Hamilton Masakadza; Stuart Matsikenyeri; Tino Mawoyo; Christopher Mpofu; Mluleki Nkala; Ed Rainsford; Sean Williams	Shahriar Nafees (c); Abdur Razzak; Aftab Ahmed; Farhad Reza; Mashrafe Mortaza; Mehrab Hossain Jnr; Mushfiqur Rahim (wk); Mohammad Rafique; Nadif Chowdhury; Nazmus Sadat; Shahadat Hossain; Shakib Al Hasan; Tapash Baisya	Prosper Utseya (c); Brendan Taylor (wk); Gary Brent; Chamu Chibhabha; Elton Chigumbura; Graeme Cremer; Keith Dabengwa; Ryan Higgins; Anthony Ireland; Blessing Mahwire; Hamilton Masakadza; Stuart Matsikenyeri; Tino Mawoyo; Christopher Mpofu; Mluleki Nkala; Ed Rainsford; Sean Williams

== Venues ==
Bogra	Dhaka	Khulna
Shaheed Chandu Stadium	Sher-e-Bangla National Cricket Stadium	Sheikh Abu Naser Stadium
Capacity: 18,000	Capacity: 26,000	Capacity: 15,600
Zimbabwean cricket team in Bangladesh in 2006–07 is located in Bangladesh

== Tour match ==
26 November 2006
(scorecard)

(Zimbabwe) Zimbabweans; 221/8 (50 overs)	v	(Bangladesh) BCB Presidents XI; 195 (47.2 overs)
Stuart Matsikenyeri 49 (87); Mosharraf Hossain 3/34 (10 overs)		Nadif Chowdhury 42 (72); Gary Brent 3/32 (9.2 overs)

(Zimbabwe) Zimbabweans won by 26 runs
Bangladesh Krira Shiksha Pratisthan Ground, Savar, Bangladesh
Umpires: Enamul Haque (Ban) and Nadir Shah (Ban).

- Zimbabweans won the toss and elected to bat.

== Only T20I ==
28 November 2006
(Scorecard)

Bangladesh; 166 (19.5 overs)	v	Zimbabwe; 123/9 (20 overs)
Mashrafe Mortaza 36 (26); Prosper Utseya 3/25 (4 overs)		Sean Williams 38 (42); Abdur Razzak 3/17 (4 overs)

Bangladesh won by 43 runs
Khulna Divisional Stadium, Khulna, Bangladesh
Umpires: Enamul Haque (Ban) and Nadir Shah (Ban)
Player of the match: Mashrafe Mortaza (BAN)

- Zimbabwe won the toss and elected to field.
- This was Bangladesh and Zimbabwe's both inaugural T20I match.
- Nazmus Sadat, Shahriar Nafees, Aftab Ahmed, Shakib Al Hasan, Nadif Chowdhury, Farhad Reza, Mushfiqur Rahim, Mashrafe Mortaza, Mohammad Rafique, Abdur Razzak, Shahadat Hossain (Ban), Brendan Taylor, Stuart Matsikenyeri, Elton Chigumbura, Hamilton Masakadza, Sean Williams, Keith Dabengwa, Mluleki Nkala, Gary Brent, Prosper Utseya, Chamu Chibhabha, Anthony Ireland (Zim) all made their T20Is debuts.

== ODI series ==
=== 1st ODI ===
30 November 2006
(Scorecard)

Zimbabwe; 184/9 (50 overs)	v	Bangladesh; 186/1 (45.3 overs)
Brendan Taylor 38 (71 balls); Abdur Razzak 4/33 (10 overs)		Shahriar Nafees 105* (138 balls); Sean Williams 1/26 (10 overs)

Bangladesh won by 9 wickets
Khulna Divisional Stadium, Khulna, Bangladesh
Umpires: Suresh Shastri (Ind) and Nadir Shah (Ban)
Player of the match: Shahriar Nafees (Ban)

- Zimbabwe won the toss and elected to bat.

=== 2nd ODI ===
3 December 2006
Scorecard

Zimbabwe; 217/7 (50 overs)	v	Bangladesh; 218/4 (42.4 overs)
Sean Williams 61 (70 balls); Mohammad Rafique 2/34 (10 overs)		Shahriar Nafees 67 (68 balls); Sean Williams 1/24 (4 overs)

Bangladesh won by 6 wickets
Shaheed Chandu Stadium, Bogra, Bangladesh
Umpires: Nadeem Ghauri (Pak) and Enamul Haque (Ban)
Player of the match: Sean Williams (Zim)

- Bangladesh won the toss and elected to field.

=== 3rd ODI ===
5 December
(Scorecard)

Bangladesh; 220 (49.2 overs)	v	Zimbabwe; 194 (49 overs)
Mehrab Hossain jnr 38 (77 balls); Christopher Mpofu 4/42 (9.2 overs)		Sean Williams 68 (109 balls); Abdur Razzak 5/33 (10 overs)

Bangladesh won by 26 runs
Shaheed Chandu Stadium, Bogra
Umpires: Suresh Shastri (Ind) and Enamul Haque (Ban)
Player of the match: Abdur Razzak (Ban)

- Zimbabwe won the toss and elected to field.

=== 4th ODI ===
8 December
(Scorecard)

Zimbabwe; 146 (47.2 overs)	v	Bangladesh; 147/2 (32.2 overs)
Elton Chigumbura 32 (47 balls); Mashrafe Mortaza 3/14 (6.2 overs)		Aftab Ahmed 58 (69 balls); Gary Brent 2/25 (8 overs)

Bangladesh won by 8 wickets
Sher-e-Bangla Cricket Stadium, Dhaka
Umpires: Nadeem Ghauri (Pak) and Nadir Shah (Ban)
Player of the match: Aftab Ahmed (Ban)

- Bangladesh won the toss and elected to field.

=== 5th ODI ===
9 December
(Scorecard)

Zimbabwe; 193/8 (50 overs)	v	Bangladesh; 197/7 (49 overs)
Stuart Matsikenyeri 75 (114 balls); Mashrafe Mortaza 3/36 (10 overs)		Mehrab Hossain jnr 45 (98 balls); Gary Brent 4/22 (10 overs)

Bangladesh won by 3 wickets
Sher-e-Bangla Cricket Stadium, Dhaka
Umpires: Suresh Shastri (Ind) and Nadir Shah (Ban)
Player of the match: Gary Brent (Zim)

- Bangladesh won the toss and elected to field.
