= 2005–06 Zimbabwe Tri-Nation Series =

Videocon Tri-Series
- Date: 24 August 2005 – 6 September 2005
- Location: Zimbabwe
- Result: New Zealand won the series.
Teams
India	New Zealand	Zimbabwe
Captains
Sourav Ganguly	Stephen Fleming	Tatenda Taibu
Most runs
Most wickets

The Videocon Tri-Series was a three-team One Day International cricket tournament played between Zimbabwe, India and New Zealand in Zimbabwe. New Zealand won the tournament, defeating India by 6 wickets in the final in Harare.

== Tournament structure ==
The sides played each other in a double round robin, meaning that each side played four matches, for a total of six matches. A win was worth five points, and a loss zero – however, if the winning team had a run rate (i.e. runs hit per over) higher than 1.25 times that of the opponent, a bonus point was awarded to the winning side, if not it went to the losing side. In the event of a tie or a no-result, each side was to be awarded three points. The top two teams on points went through to the one-match final.

== Schedule ==
Date	Match	Venue
August; 24	Zim v NZ, 1st ODI	Bulawayo
26	Ind v NZ, 2nd ODI	Bulawayo
29	Ind v Zim, 3rd ODI	Harare
31	Zim v NZ, 4th ODI	Harare
September; 2	Ind v NZ, 5th ODI	Harare
4	Zim v Ind, 6th ODI	Harare
6	Ind v NZ, final	Harare

== Match details ==
=== 1st ODI, Zimbabwe v New Zealand 24 August ===
24 August 2005
Scorecard

New Zealand; 397/5 (44 overs)	v	Zimbabwe; 205 (43 overs)
L Vincent 172 (120); AJ Ireland 2/52 [7]		HH Streak 45 (48); DL Vettori 3/29 [8]

New Zealand won by 192 runs
Queens Sports Club, Bulawayo
Umpires: KC Barbour (ZIM) and IL Howell (SA)
Player of the match: L Vincent (NZ)

- Zimbabwe won the toss and elected to field.
- The match was reduced before play started to 44 overs per side.
- AJ Ireland (ZIM) made his ODI debut.
- Points: Zimbabwe 0; New Zealand 6.

=== 2nd ODI, New Zealand v India, 26 August ===
26 August 2005
Scorecard

New Zealand; 215 (43.1 overs)	v	India; 164 (37.2 overs)
CD McMillan 54 (54); IK Pathan 3/34 [8]		JP Yadav 69 (92); SE Bond 6/19 [9]

New Zealand won by 51 runs
Queens Sports Club, Bulawayo
Umpires: DJ Harper (AUS) and RB Tiffin (ZIM)
Player of the match: SE Bond (NZ)

- New Zealand won the toss and elected to bat.
- Points: India 0; New Zealand 6.

=== 3rd ODI, Zimbabwe v India, 29 August ===
29 August 2005
Scorecard

India; 226/6 (50 overs)	v	Zimbabwe; 65 (24.3 overs)
M Kaif 65 (122); AJ Ireland 3/54 [10]		HH Streak 18* (52); IK Pathan 5/27 [10]

India won by 161 runs
Harare Sports Club, Harare
Umpires: KC Barbour (ZIM) and IL Howell (SA)
Player of the match: IK Pathan (IND)

- Zimbabwe won the toss and elected to field.
- Points: Zimbabwe 0; India 6.

=== 4th ODI, Zimbabwe v New Zealand, 31 August ===
31 August 2005
Scorecard

New Zealand; 238 (49.1 overs)	v	Zimbabwe; 211 (49 overs)
SB Styris 63 (81); AM Blignaut 4/46 [9.1]		AM Blignaut 50 (47); SE Bond 4/17 [7]

New Zealand won by 27 runs
Harare Sports Club, Harare
Umpires: DJ Harper (AUS) and RB Tiffin (ZIM)
Player of the match: AM Blignaut (ZIM)

- New Zealand won the toss and elected to bat.
- JS Patel (NZ) and CJ Chibhabha (ZIM) made their ODI debuts.
- Points: Zimbabwe 0; New Zealand 6.

=== 5th ODI, New Zealand v India, 2 September ===
2 September 2005
Scorecard

New Zealand; 278/9 (50 overs)	v	India; 279/4 (47.3 overs)
SB Styris 56 (89); A Nehra 2/57 [10]		M Kaif 102* (121); JDP Oram 1/22 [5]

India won by 6 wickets
Harare Sports Club, Harare
Umpires: KC Barbour (ZIM) and IL Howell (SA)
Player of the match: M Kaif (IND)

- New Zealand won the toss and elected to bat.
- Points: India 6; New Zealand 0.

=== 6th ODI, Zimbabwe v India, 4 September ===
4 September 2005
Scorecard

Zimbabwe; 250 (50 overs)	v	India; 255/6 (48.1 overs)
CK Coventry 74 (99); AB Agarkar 3/34 [10]		Yuvraj Singh 120 (124); NB Mahwire 2/40 [9.1]

India won by 4 wickets
Harare Sports Club, Harare
Umpires: DJ Harper (AUS) and RB Tiffin (ZIM)
Player of the match: Yuvraj Singh (IND)

- India won the toss and elected to field.
- RP Singh (IND) and KM Dabengwa (ZIM) made their ODI debuts.
- Points: Zimbabwe 0; India 6.

== Final group stage table ==
Tri-Series Standings
Team	M	W	L	NR	Pts	NRR
New Zealand	4	3	1	0	18	+1.32
India	4	3	1	0	18	+0.68
Zimbabwe	4	0	4	0	0	−2.03

== Final, New Zealand v India, 6 September ==
6 September 2005
Scorecard

India; 276 (49.3 overs)	v	New Zealand; 278/4 (48.1 overs)
M Kaif 93* (110); JDP Oram 4/58 [8.3]		NJ Astle 115* (131); V Sehwag 3/44 [10]

New Zealand won by 6 wickets
Harare Sports Club, Harare
Umpires: KC Barbour (ZIM) and DJ Harper (AUS)
Player of the match: NJ Astle (NZ)

- India won the toss and elected to bat.
