= Zimbabwean cricket crisis =

Sports controversy in Zimbabwe

Cricket in Zimbabwe suffered a crisis that lasted from 2003 to 2011 where player withdrawals such as the "black-armband protest" by Andy Flower and Henry Olonga along with a mass loss of players in 2004 due to a general strike resulted in very poor performances by the national team often comprising new and inexperienced players. Presently Zimbabwe is in the period of rebuilding itself as the domestic structure was re-structured in 2009. Many people allege that the administration of cricket in Zimbabwe was corrupted by the influence of Robert Mugabe's government, who were widely accused of following racist, in particular anti-white, policies. Positive signs began to emerge for Zimbabwe after the 2007 Cricket World Cup especially when in the 2007 World Twenty20 Zimbabwe defeated what was arguably the strongest side in the world at the time, Australia. Along with this Zimbabwe gradually began to show encouraging signs of improvement and four years later they returned to the highest format of the game, Test Cricket. In their first match since their return in August 2011 they comprehensively defeated Bangladesh.

== Crisis emerges ==
During the 2000–01 season, players began to allege political interference in the running of the game in Zimbabwe. There had already been a reduction in government funding for the sport's development. The players alleged that selection of the national team was subject to interference and particularly resented the imposition of a quota system to ensure a minimum number of black players would be included. The players argued that the black players were gradually emerging, as in South Africa, and that they would increase in due course. For example, Hamilton Masakadza had already made his mark as a batsman, and Mluleki Nkala and Henry Olonga were making their mark as bowlers.

The matter came to prominence before the 2003 World Cup, when both the British prime minister Tony Blair and the Australian prime minister John Howard said they would prefer it if their teams did not travel to Zimbabwe, but did not ban them from doing so. In the event, only England refused to travel to Harare to play Zimbabwe after a vote by the players citing security concerns after death threats were received, thereby forfeiting the match. In Zimbabwe's first match, two players, one white, one black (Andy Flower and Henry Olonga) wore black armbands in protest against "the death of democracy in Zimbabwe". Both players subsequently retired and emigrated from Zimbabwe, under intense political pressure, with the black Olonga being denounced as not really Zimbabwean as he was born in Zambia.

== Team hits rock bottom ==
In 2004, the Zimbabwe Cricket Union sacked their white captain Heath Streak after he had confronted them with the team's grievances, several other players having also resigned by this time. Streak was replaced by the young and untested Tatenda Taibu. Fifteen senior players were involved in a stand-off over this and other selection issues, resulting in their dismissal from Zimbabwean cricket. Following poor performances by a second-string (and almost all black) Zimbabwe team against Sri Lanka, the ZCU and ICC agreed that Zimbabwe would play no Test cricket in 2004, and this self-imposed suspension remained in force from 10 June 2004 to 6 January 2005.

In their first match after the suspension, Zimbabwe lost to Bangladesh at the MA Aziz Stadium in Chittagong by 226 runs. The second and final match in the series was drawn. Bangladesh had until then been generally considered the weakest team in Test cricket, and by beating Zimbabwe, recorded its first ever Test match and series victories. Bangladesh then defeated Zimbabwe in a limited overs series.

In February and March 2005, Zimbabwe toured South Africa to play three ODIs and two Tests. Zimbabwe was completely and hopelessly outclassed, and Wisden 2006 described the tour as "gruesome" and "embarrassing to all who saw it".

Meanwhile, in domestic cricket, the Logan Cup had been played, with just four participants, and had been won as usual by Mashonaland. But it is debatable if the competition should have retained first-class status and there were grave doubts about its future: see 2004–05 Zimbabwean cricket season.

In August 2005, the New Zealand cricket team arrived in Zimbabwe to play two Test matches and duly won both by an innings with embarrassing ease. The tour was inevitably preceded by controversy because of strong feeling in New Zealand about Mugabe. As with the previous England and Australia situations, the New Zealand government advised the team not to go but did not actually bar them from doing so. Since the ICC would not accept any other reason for non-attendance, the New Zealand players turned up and won easily. However, the NZ government did have some fight in them because they effectively banned a return tour by refusing to issue visas to the Zimbabwean party.

During the New Zealand series, Zimbabwe Cricket fired national coach Phil Simmons. The players signed a petition to denounce the decision and Simmons took ZC to court while they tried to have him deported.

In September 2005, the visitors were India; like New Zealand, India was not barred from going to Zimbabwe and decided to go to avert ICC sanctions. In India's case, controversy erupted within its own team on account of arguments between team captain Sourav Ganguly and the new coach Greg Chappell. This row diverted the sport's attention from Zimbabwe and shifted the focus onto India. Despite its problems, the Indian team won both matches easily against sub-standard opposition.

There had been a brief reconciliation with some of the rebel players, Heath Streak and Andy Blignaut having played in some of the 2005 Tests, but then the Simmons affair sparked a wider mutiny under Taibu's leadership. In October 2005, Streak announced his retirement from international cricket and indicated that he would concentrate on a county career with Warwickshire CCC in England. In November 2005, Taibu resigned as captain. He stated that: "If we don't do anything, cricket in Zimbabwe will die within a year". Taibu is now playing as an overseas player for Namibia in South African provincial competition. He, however, was surprisingly a member of the 07/08 squad for the series against Pakistan in Pakistan. Taibu was then a key cog in the national team.

== Hopes fade in 2006 ==
As 2006 began, Mugabe's government replaced the board of Zimbabwe Cricket with an interim committee and this announced a further twelve month withdrawal from Test cricket. Meanwhile, the 2005–06 Logan Cup did not get under way and all the matches were indefinitely postponed. However the 2006–07 Logan Cup did take place.

During 2006, Zimbabwe played a few ODIs only but was soundly beaten by Bangladesh and also lost twice to ICC associate member Kenya.

For more information about the tours since 2005, see :

- New Zealand cricket team in Zimbabwe in 2005-06
- Indian cricket team in Zimbabwe in 2005-06
- Kenyan cricket team in Zimbabwe in 2005-06
- Bangladeshi cricket team in Zimbabwe in 2006
- Bangladeshi cricket team in Zimbabwe in 2006-07

The domestic game seemed to have all but deteriorated and hopes of a return to the promise that Zimbabwe showed in the 1990s looked to be forlorn.

== Cricket resurgence (2007–2011) ==
By late 2007 the Zimbabwean team had defeated Australia in the 2007 ICC World Twenty20 and gradually signs emerged as Zimbabwe began to build on these small blocks and improve their performance bit by bit. By 2010 Zimbabwe Cricket informed the International Cricket Council that they intended to return to Test Cricket after the 2011 Cricket World Cup, the ICC agreed as a result of Zimbabwe's improving performance. In August 2011 Zimbabwe played their first Test Match in 6 years and won comprehensively defeating Bangladesh. Following the victory in the one-off Test Match, Zimbabwe sealed the ODI series 3–2.

During this period of time Zimbabwe Cricket restructured itself domestically and from grassroots levels, new domestic teams emerged and a full-fledged Domestic Twenty20 tournament has seen the country's cricket infrastructure improve. The team also plans to build a stadium near Victoria Falls and has renovated Harare Sports Club along with Queen's Sports Club in Bulawayo.

== Player pay dispute ==
In 2013, another dispute engulfed Zimbabwe Cricket. Players threatened to strike during Zimbabwe's ODI series against Pakistan in August. Negotiations made sure that players went out to play against Pakistan. Surprisingly, the unpaid Zimbabwe players defeated Pakistan in one of the three ODIs.
The first test of the Test series was also under threat of a player strike but ZC made sure a team was fielded for the Test. Brendan Taylor decided not to believe ZC and sat out of the first test. Zimbabwe went on to beat a lacklustre Pakistan side in the second test match, sparking hopes of recovery for Zimbabwean cricket.
These hopes were short-lived as the pay dispute got intense in December 2013, when Zimbabwean players went on strike which led to a suspension of the four- and one-day tournaments that were underway.

== See also ==
- Cricket in Zimbabwe

== External sources ==
- ZimbabweCricket
- CricketArchive – List of Tournaments in Zimbabwe
