= Charles Coventry (Zimbabwean cricketer) =

Zimbabwean cricketer

Personal information
- Full name: Charles Kevin Coventry
- Born: 8 March 1983 (age 43); Kwekwe, Zimbabwe
- Nickname: Choppa
- Batting: Right-handed
- Bowling: Right-arm leg break
- Role: Batsman, occasional wicket-keeper
- Relatives: Charles Coventry (father)

International information
- National side: Zimbabwe (2005–2015)
- Test debut (cap 72): 13 September 2005 v India
- Last Test: 20 September 2005 v India
- ODI debut (cap 74): 6 July 2003 v England
- Last ODI: 31 May 2015 v Pakistan
- ODI shirt no.: 74
- T20I debut (cap 23): 3 May 2010 v Sri Lanka
- Last T20I: 19 July 2015 v India

Domestic team information
- Years: Team
- 1998/99–2005/06: Matabeleland
- 2006/07–2008/09: Westerns
- 2009/10–2012/13: Matabeleland Tuskers
- 2013: Duronto Rajshahi

Career statistics
Competition	Test	ODI	T20I	FC
Matches	2	39	13	64
Runs scored	88	831	127	3,018
Batting average	22.00	24.44	12.70	27.43
100s/50s	0/0	1/3	0/0	5/14
Top score	37	194*	30	116
Balls bowled	–	–	0	210
Wickets	–	–	0	2
Bowling average	–	–	–	77.50
5 wickets in innings	–	–	0	0
10 wickets in match	–	–	0	0
Best bowling	–	–	–	1/26
Catches/stumpings	3/–	19/1	2/0	99/3
- Source: CricketArchive, 23 April 2023

Charles Kevin Coventry (born 8 March 1983) is a Zimbabwean cricketer. He is a right-handed batsman and occasional wicket-keeper.

== Early life ==
Coventry was born on 8 March 1983 at Kwekwe in Zimbabwe. The son of Charles "Chuck" Coventry, one of Zimbabwe's leading umpires, he was born into a cricketing family. His father introduced Charles to cricket from a young age, playing in their back garden and also at the Bulawayo Athletic Club. His father's coaching experience provided a grounding in technique and attitude.

Coventry began playing proper cricket in the third grade at Whitestone School, playing two seasons in the colts team and two in the senior side. His best performance was taking a hat-trick with his leg breaks. In his final two years he represented Matabeleland Primary School's team in the national Primary Schools Cricket Weeks, scoring two half-centuries but not making it into the national age group side. He went to High School at Christian Brothers College, Bulawayo where he also played cricket, and was selected for the national under-14 side, progressing through the under-16 and under-19 teams. His best performance was a score of 94 runs against the South African side Northerns.

Whilst at school, Coventry started playing club cricket for Bulawayo Athletic Club, starting off in the Third XI but progressing quickly into the First XI. He was encouraged to take up wicketkeeping.

== Domestic cricket career ==
Coventry made his Logan Cup debut aged only 15. He had taken his gear along to a match his father was going to umpire "just in case", but due to a mix-up a Matabeleland player failed to arrive on time and Coventry was told he would be playing. He went in to bat fifth in the batting order, with Matabeleland on 66/3, chasing Mashonaland's total of 243. He was immediately hit on the body from the bowling of Andy Blignaut, and faced three other international-quality bowlers, Eddo Brandes, Paul Strang and Everton Matambanadzo. He scored 33 runs from 121 balls before being run out. Coventry paid credit to Guy Whittall for helping him through that innings. Since his debut, Coventry has been a Matabele regular, opening the innings.

In 2002 Coventry applied to and was accepted by the CFX Academy, doing well there before returning to Matabeleland. At this time, he also represented Zimbabwe at Under-19 level and played in eight Youth One Day Internationals during the 2001–02 Under-19 World Cup in New Zealand.

When Zimbabwean cricketers rebelled against the ruling body in 2005, Coventry initially joined the action, but returned along with Gavin Ewing and Barney Rogers. He did not play for Zimbabwe in Bangladesh or South Africa, but his continued domestic form saw him picked as Zimbabwe A's wicket-keeper for the series against Pakistan A. Coventry did not play in either of the four-day matches, with first Neil Ferreira and then Brendan Taylor being preferred, but he did play in the two one-day contests. In the first match he scored just six, but in the second he produced a fine innings that catapulted him into national contention.

Zimbabwe, under the captaincy of Stuart Carlisle, had been put in to bat and fine spells from Najaf Shah and Mohammad Khalil had left Zimbabwe A reeling on 54/4. Coventry proceeded to launch an inspired counter-attack, first with Stuart Matsikenyeri, who scored a gritty 55 at the top of the order, in a partnership of 68, then Blessing Mahwire dug in with Coventry too, Mahwire scoring 41 in a hundred-run stand for the seventh wicket. Coventry finished on 102* off 143 balls. The innings proved to be the match-winning contribution as Pakistan A were all out for 181, well short of Zimbabwe A's 232.

== International career ==
Good domestic form saw Coventry called up for the full national squad to tour England in 2003. He opened the batting in a One Day International against England at Bristol, but struggled, scoring three off 10 balls. He was subsequently dropped for the Australia tour. He did not play again until 2005, when, after scoring a century against Pakistan A, Coventry returned to the side as a supersub against New Zealand. In a match that Zimbabwe lost heavily, Coventry scored an entertaining 25. He subsequently played in the next three ODIs against New Zealand and India scoring 0, 35 and 74.

Later in the summer, Coventry made his Test debut against India at Bulawayo, batting in the lower order with his customary aggression, and did better than many other Zimbabweans, scoring 2, 24, 27 and 35 in two heavy defeats. In 2006 he played in a number of one day matches against Kenya and went on the tour of the West Indies, although after a disciplinary issue he was sent home early. As a result, he found himself out of the side again and subsequently did not play at the international level again until August 2009 when he returned to the Zimbabwean side to play a five-match one-day series against Bangladesh.

On 16 August 2009 in the fourth One Day International against Bangladesh at the Queens Sports Club in Bulawayo, Coventry scored 194 not out, his first century at international level. It also equalled the then-record score set by Saeed Anwar for the highest individual innings in a One Day International and set a record for the highest maiden century in ODIs. As of February 2025 it remains the highest score batting at number three in an ODI.
