= Zimbabwean cricket team in Bangladesh in 2004–05 =

Zimbabwean cricket team in Bangladesh in 2004-05
	Zimbabwe	Bangladesh
- Dates: 6 January – 31 January 2005
Captains	Tatenda Taibu	Habibul Bashar

Test series
- Result: Bangladesh won the 2-match series 1–0
Most runs	Tatenda Taibu (330)	Nafees Iqbal (205)
Most wickets	Douglas Hondo (9)	Enamul Haque jnr (18)
- Player of the series: Enamul Haque jnr (Ban)

One Day International series
- Results: Bangladesh won the 5-match series 3–2
Most runs	Barney Rogers (251)	Aftab Ahmed (179)
Most wickets	Tinashe Panyangara (7)	Manjural Islam Rana (9)
- Player of the series: Barney Rogers (Zim)

The Zimbabwe cricket team toured Bangladesh in January 2005 to play two Test matches and five One Day International matches. Bangladesh won the Test series 1–0 with one match drawn. This was Bangladesh's first win in a Test match and their first Test series victory. They also won the ODI series, by a 3–2 margin.

== Schedule ==
Date	Match	Venue
January
6 January 2005	1st Test	MA Aziz Stadium, Chittagong
14 January 2005	2nd Test	Bangabandhu National Stadium, Dhaka
20 January 2005	1st ODI	Bangabandhu National Stadium, Dhaka
24 January 2005	2nd ODI	MA Aziz Stadium, Chittagong
26 January 2005	3rd ODI	MA Aziz Stadium, Chittagong
29 January 2005	4th ODI	Bangabandhu National Stadium, Dhaka
31 January 2005	5th ODI	Bangabandhu National Stadium, Dhaka

== Squads ==
Zimbabwe Test	Bangladesh Test	Zimbabwe ODI	Bangladesh ODI
Tatenda Taibu (c + wk); Elton Chigumbura; Graeme Cremer; Terry Duffin; Dion Ebrahim; Douglas Hondo; Hamilton Masakadza; Stuart Matsikenyeri; Chris Mpofu; Tawanda Mupariwa; Mluleki Nkala; Tinashe Panyangara; Brendan Taylor; Barney Rogers; Prosper Utseya; Vusi Sibanda	Habibul Bashar (c); Khaled Mashud (wk); Nafees Iqbal; Javed Omar; Mohammad Ashraful; Rajin Saleh; Aftab Ahmed; Mohammad Rafique; Enamul Haque jnr; Tapash Baisya; Mashrafe Mortaza; Talha Jubair; Manjural Islam Rana	Tatenda Taibu (c & wk); Elton Chigumbura; Dion Ebrahim; Douglas Hondo; Hamilton Masakadza; Stuart Matsikenyeri; Chris Mpofu; Tawanda Mupariwa; Mluleki Nkala; Tinashe Panyangara; Brendan Taylor; Barney Rogers; Prosper Utseya; Vusi Sibanda	Habibul Bashar (c); Khaled Mashud (wk); Nafees Iqbal; Mohammad Ashraful; Rajin Saleh; Aftab Ahmed; Enamul Haque jnr; Tapash Baisya; Mashrafe Mortaza; Manjural Islam Rana; Alok Kapali; Khaled Mahmud; Abdur Razzak; Nazmul Hossain

== Test series ==
=== 1st Test ===
6 January 2005
Scorecard

Bangladesh	v	Zimbabwe
488 (149.3 overs); Habibul Bashar 94 (128); Christopher Mpofu 4/109 (29 overs)		312 (131.4 overs); Tatenda Taibu 92 (241); Mohammad Rafique 5/65 (41.4 overs)
204/9 (51.1 overs); Habibul Bashar 55 (80); Elton Chigumbura 5/54 (16.1 overs)		154 (64.2 overs); Hamilton Masakadza 56 (130); Tapash Baisya 2/20 (10 overs)

Bangladesh won by 226 runs.
MA Aziz Stadium, Chittagong
Umpires: Tyron Wijewardene (SL) and Asad Rauf (Pak)
Player of the match: Enamul Haque jnr (Ban)

- Bangladesh won the toss and elected to bat.
- Barney Rogers, Graeme Cremer and Christopher Mpofu (Zim) all made their test debut.
- This win was Bangladesh's first ever test victory.

=== 2nd Test ===
14 January 2005
Scorecard

Bangladesh	v	Zimbabwe
211 (78.4 overs); Mohammad Rafique 56 (79); Douglas Hondo 6/59 (22 overs)		298 (118 overs); Tatenda Taibu 85 (218); Enamul Haque jnr 7/95 (35 overs)
285/5 (142 overs); Nafees Iqbal 121 (355); Tinashe Panyangara 3/28 (21 overs)		286 (103 overs); Tatenda Taibu 153 (292); Enamul Haque jnr 5/105 (37 overs)

Match Drawn
Bangabandhu National Stadium, Dhaka
Umpires: Gamini Silva (SL) and Nadeem Ghauri (Pak)
Player of the match: Tatenda Taibu (Zim)

- Bangladesh won the toss and elected to bat.
- Due to the result of this match Bangladesh won their first ever test series.

== ODI series ==
=== 1st ODI ===
20 January 2005
scorecard

Bangladesh; 229 (48.1 overs)	v	Zimbabwe; 251/8 (50 overs)
Mohammad Ashraful 42 (75); Douglas Hondo 3/36 (10 overs)		Brendan Taylor 58 (74); Nazmul Hossain 2/35 (7 overs)

Zimbabwe won by 22 runs
Bangabandhu National Stadium, Dhaka
Umpires: AFM Akhtaruddin (Ban) and Nadeem Ghauri (Pak)
Player of the match: Douglas Hondo (Zim)

- Zimbabwe won the toss and elected to bat.

=== 2nd ODI ===
24 January 2005
scorecard

Bangladesh; 206 (47.1 overs)	v	Zimbabwe; 237/5 (50 overs)
Nafees Iqbal 58 (81); Christopher Mpofu 2/19 (5.1 overs)		Barney Rogers 66 (85); Enamul Haque jnr 2/37 (10 overs)

Zimbabwe won by 31 runs
MA Aziz Stadium, Chittagong
Umpires: Asad Rauf (Pak) and Mahbubur Rahman (Ban)
Player of the match: Barney Rogers (Zim)

- Zimbabwe won the toss and elected to bat

=== 3rd ODI ===
26 January 2005
scorecard

Bangladesh; 244/9 (50 overs)	v	Zimbabwe; 204 (47.5 overs)
Aftab Ahmed 38 (55); Brendan Taylor 2/23 (5 overs)		Barney Rogers 51 (81); Manjurul Islam 4/34 (10 overs)

Bangladesh won by 40 runs
MA Aziz Stadium, Chittagong
Umpires: Asad Rauf (Pak) and Mahbubur Rahman (Ban)
Player of the match: Manjurul Islam (Ban)

- Bangladesh won the toss and elected to bat
- Enamul Haque jnr made his ODI debut

=== 4th ODI ===
29 January 2005
scorecard

Bangladesh; 247/9 (50 overs)	v	Zimbabwe; 189 (47.2 overs)
Nafees Iqbal 56 (76); Brendan Taylor 3/54 (7 overs)		Stuart Matsikenyeri 50 (69); Manjurul Islam 4/36 (10 overs)

Bangladesh won by 58 runs
Bangabandhu National Stadium, Dhaka
Umpires: AFM Akhtaruddin (Ban) and Asad Rauf (Pak)
Player of the match: Manjurul Islam (Ban)

- Bangladesh won the toss and elected to bat

=== 5th ODI ===
31 January 2005
scorecard

Bangladesh; 202/2 (33overs)	v	Zimbabwe; 198 (49 overs)
Aftab Ahmed 81 (87); Tinashe Panyangara 1/49 (8 overs)		Barney Rogers 84 (120); Mohammad Rafique 2/34 (10 overs)

Bangladesh won by 8 wickets
Bangabandhu National Stadium, Dhaka
Umpires: Mahbubur Rahman (Ban) and Nadeem Ghauri (Pak)
Player of the match: Aftab Ahmed (Ban)

- Zimbabwe won the toss and elected to bat
- As a result of this match Bangladesh recorded their first-ever ODI series victory.
