= Enamul Haque (cricketer, born 1986) =

Bangladeshi cricketer (born 1986)

Personal information
- Full name: Enamul Haque
- Born: 5 December 1986 (age 39); Sylhet, Bangladesh
- Height: 5 ft 9 in (1.75 m)
- Batting: Right-handed
- Bowling: Slow left-arm orthodox
- Role: Bowler

International information
- National side: Bangladesh (2003–2013)
- Test debut (cap 34): 21 October 2003 v England
- Last Test: 17 April 2013 v Zimbabwe
- ODI debut (cap 76): 24 January 2005 v Zimbabwe
- Last ODI: 5 November 2009 v Zimbabwe

Domestic team information
- Years: Team
- 2001–2022: Sylhet Division
- 2012-2013: Chittagong Kings
- 2015: Chittagong Vikings
- 2019–20: Chattogram Challengers

Career statistics
Competition	Test	ODI	FC	LA
Matches	15	10	139	147
Runs scored	59	12	2,247	392
Batting average	5.90	3.00	14.31	7.68
100s/50s	0/0	0/0	0/6	0/0
Top score	13	5	91	37*
Balls bowled	3,549	576	30,446	7,416
Wickets	44	14	510	184
Bowling average	40.61	30.14	30.25	29.41
5 wickets in innings	3	0	35	1
10 wickets in match	1	0	6	0
Best bowling	7/95	3/16	7/47	5/41
Catches/stumpings	3/–	8/–	62/–	40/–
- Source: CricketArchive, 24 December 2025

Enamul Haque (Bengali: এনামুল হক; born 5 December 1986) – also known as Enamul Haque Jr to distinguish him from Enamul Haque, who also played for Bangladesh, but was not related to him – is a Bangladeshi cricketer. He currently plays for his home team, Sylhet Division in National Cricket League and Prime Bank Cricket Club in the Dhaka Premier Division.

He is a right-handed batsman and slow left-arm orthodox bowler. He made his Test debut against England at Dhaka in 2003. In April 2004, the Bangladesh Cricket Board granted Enamul his first six-month rookie contract, with pay below that of senior national players.

== Domestic career ==
During a match against Rajshahi Division in December 2005, Enamul Haque claimed his 100th first-class wicket when he dismissed Rafiqul Islam caught and bowled. Playing against Khulna Division in November 2007, Enamul Haque took his 200th first-class wicket when he had Imrul Kayes stumped.

The Bangladesh Cricket Board founded the six-team Bangladesh Premier League in 2012, a twenty20 tournament to be held in February that year. An auction was held for teams to buy players, and Enamul Haque was bought by the Chittagong Kings for $55,000. He took 13 wickets from 9 matches, and immediately after the tournament was selected in Bangladesh's ODI squad for the 2012 Asia Cup. In November 2019, he was selected to play for the Chattogram Challengers in the 2019–20 Bangladesh Premier League.

Having gone four years without taking more than four wickets in an innings, Enamul Haque took two five-wicket hauls against Dhaka Metropolis in November 2011, to finish with match figures of 10/77, to help his team to victory. On 21 December 2011, he became the first Bangladeshi bowler to achieve his 300th First-Class wicket against Khulna Division with the bowling figures of 5/95. In November 2021, in the 2021–22 National Cricket League, he took his 500th first-class wicket.

== International career ==
Zimbabwe toured Bangladesh in January 2005 for two Tests and five ODIs. The touring Zimbabwe side had suffered due to player disputes which in 2004 had led to the ICC suspending the country from Test cricket. Of Zimbabwe's 16-man squad, only their captain Tatenda Taibu had played more than nine Tests; Bangladesh were the more experienced team. In the first match, Bangladesh secured their maiden victory in Test cricket. Having not taken a wicket in Zimbabwe's first innings, Enamul Haque's haul of 6/45 in the second helped his team to victory and set the record for best bowling figures for Bangladesh in Tests. The second Test ended in a draw, giving Bangladesh their first series win. In one innings Enamul Haque took 7/95, beating his own record for best bowling figures for Bangladesh, and took 12/200 in the match, so that at the age of 18 years and 40 days he became the youngest bowler to take ten wickets in a Test, overtaking Pakistan's Wasim Akram.

Enamul Haque returned to the ODI side in 2009 after a gap of three years when he was selected in the squad to face Zimbabwe in three matches and a tri-series with Sri Lanka and Zimbabwe. He was selected in the absence of first-choice veteran spinner Abdur Razzak and because he had a good record against Zimbabwe. Zimbabwe toured Bangladesh in October for five ODIs. In the fourth match of the series, Enamul Haque recorded his best bowling figures in ODIs (3/16) and took his 50th wicket in list A cricket when he dismissed Elton Chigumbura caught and bowled. In December, Enamul Haque was one of 13 players to be given a one-year central contract with the BCB. When the Board announced the new list of central contracts in November 2010, Enamul Haque's was not renewed.

== Personal life ==
Enamul Haque is married with Nupur Aziz, who is the daughter of Masum Aziz, a famous Bangladeshi Television and Stage Actor. The couple had a baby girl during 2016.

== Current status ==
As of 2026, Enamul Haque is involved with cricket coaching in the London County Cricket Academy in the UK. He is also involved in coaching at Fulham cricket club.
