= Lisa Astle =

New Zealand cricketer

Personal information
- Full name: Lisa Marie Astle
- Born: 17 May 1973 (age 53); Christchurch, New Zealand
- Batting: Right-handed
- Bowling: Right-arm medium
- Role: Batter
- Relatives: Nathan Astle (brother); Robbie Frew (husband)

International information
- National side: New Zealand (1993)
- Only ODI (cap 62): 24 July 1993 v Denmark

Domestic team information
- Years: Team
- 1993/94–2000/01: Canterbury

Career statistics
Competition	WODI	WFC	WLA
Matches	1	17	65
Runs scored	–	533	1,013
Batting average	–	21.32	23.55
100s/50s	–	0/3	0/3
Top score	–	93	86
Balls bowled	–	504	–
Wickets	–	5	–
Bowling average	–	52.00	–
5 wickets in innings	–	0	–
10 wickets in match	–	0	–
Best bowling	–	2/30	–
Catches/stumpings	0/–	14/–	20/–
- Source: CricketArchive, 1 November 2021

Lisa Marie Astle (born 17 May 1973) is a New Zealand former cricketer who played as a right-handed batter. She appeared in a single match for New Zealand, at the 1993 World Cup. She played domestic cricket for Canterbury.

Astle was born in Christchurch. Her only international appearance came at the 1993 World Cup in England, aged 20, when she played against Denmark. She neither batted nor bowled in the match. Astle's brother, Nathan Astle, also played internationally, and she is married to Robbie Frew, who played first-class cricket for Canterbury.
