= Ryan Higgins =

Ryan Higgins may refer to:

- Ryan Higgins (cricketer, born 1988), Zimbabwean cricketer
- Ryan Higgins (cricketer, born 1995), English cricketer
- Ryan T. Higgins, American children's book author
