= Kenyan cricket team in Zimbabwe in 2005–06 =

Kenyan cricket team in Zimbabwe in 2005-06
	Zimbabwe	Kenya
- Dates: 25 February – 4 March 2006
Captains	Terry Duffin	Steve Tikolo

One Day International series
- Results: 5-match series drawn 2–2
Most runs	Piet Rinke (168)	Kennedy Otieno (169)
Most wickets	Ryan Higgins (7)	Peter Ongondo (11)
- Player of the series: Thomas Odoyo (Ken)

Kenya toured Zimbabwe for a series of five One Day Internationals in February and March 2006. Before this tour, Kenya had only played five One Day Internationals since reaching the semi-final of the 2003 World Cup, all of which they had lost. They were keen to acquire more international experience before the 2007 World Cup. Zimbabwe had suffered a series of player disputes and poor results amid continuing political troubles in that country, leading to their self-suspension from Test cricket.

The series ended in a 2–2 draw, with one match abandoned. Kenya had never previously drawn or won a One Day International series.

== ODI series ==
=== 1st ODI ===
25 February 2006
Scorecard

Kenya; 227/9 (50 overs)	v	Zimbabwe; 231/2 (43.3 overs)
Kennedy Otieno 74 (112); Hamilton Masakadza 2/26 (4 overs)		Brendan Taylor 60* (58); Peter Ongondo 1/37 (8 overs)

Zimbabwe won by 8 wickets
Queens Sports Club, Bulawayo
Umpires: Kevan Barbour (Zim) and Tyron Wijewardene (SL)
Player of the match: Terry Duffin (Zim)

- Kenya won the toss and elected to bat.
- Terry Duffin, Keegan Meth, Piet Rinke, Gregory Strydom (Zim), Tanmay Mishra and Nehemiah Odhiambo (Ken) all made their ODI debuts.

=== 2nd ODI ===
26 February 2006
Scorecard

Kenya; 284/7 (50 overs)	v	Zimbabwe; 205 (46.2 overs)
Steve Tikolo 98 (83); Anthony Ireland 3/46 (10 overs)		Keegan Meth 53 (80); Peter Ongondo 3/26 (7 overs)

Kenya won by 79 runs
Queens Sports Club, Bulawayo
Umpires: Russell Tiffin (Zim) and Tyron Wijewardene (SL)
Player of the match: Steve Tikolo (Ken)

- Zimbabwe won the toss and elected to field.
- Ryan Higgins (Zim) made his ODI debut.

=== 3rd ODI ===
1 March 2006
Scorecard

Kenya; 134 (42.5 overs)	v	Zimbabwe; 69 (22.5 overs)
David Obuya 22 (44); Ed Rainsford 3/16 (9 overs)		Brendan Taylor 33 (50); Peter Ongondo 4/14 (5.5 overs)

Kenya won by 65 runs
Harare Sports Club, Harare
Umpires: Russell Tiffin (Zim) and Tyron Wijewardene (SL)
Player of the match: Thomas Odoyo (Ken)

- Kenya won the toss and elected to bat.

=== 4th ODI ===
3 March 2006
Scorecard

Zimbabwe; 231/9 (44 overs)	v	Kenya; 122 (36.5 overs)
Piet Rinke 72 (83); Peter Ongondo 3/32 (9 overs)		Kennedy Otieno 69 (94); Ryan Higgins 4/21 (9 overs)

Zimbabwe won by 109 runs
Harare Sports Club, Harare
Umpires: Russell Tiffin (Zim) and Tyron Wijewardene (SL)
Player of the match: Ryan Higgins (Zim)

- Zimbabwe won the toss and elected to bat.

=== 5th ODI ===
4 March 2006
Scorecard

Zimbabwe	v	Kenya

Match abandoned
Harare Sports Club, Harare
Umpires: Kevan Barbour (Zim) and Tyron Wijewardene (SL)

- No toss.
- The match was reduced to 44 overs per side due to overnight rain.
