= Kudzai =

Kudzai is a given name. Notable people with the name include:

- Kudzai Maunze (born 1991), Zimbabwean cricketer
- Kudzai Sauramba (born 1992), Zimbabwean cricketer
- Kudzai Taibu (born 1984), Zimbabwean cricketer
