= Kian Blignaut =

Zimbabwean cricketer (born 2008)

Personal information
- Full name: Kian Hendrik Blignaut
- Born: 18 June 2008 (age 18); Harare, Zimbabwe
- Batting: Right-handed
- Role: All rounder
- Relatives: Andy Blignaut (father)

Domestic team information
- Years: Team
- 2025: Takashinga
- LA debut: 2025 Zimbabwe A v Scotland

Career statistics
Competition	List A cricket
Matches	1
Runs scored	47
Batting average	47.00
100s/50s	0/0
Top score	47
Catches/stumpings	0/0
- Source: Cricinfo, 26 January 2026 2025

Kian Hendrik Blignaut (born 18 June 2008) is a Zimbabwean cricketer. An all-rounder, he is a right-handed batter and left arm spin bowler.

== Career ==
Blignaut made his debut for the Zimbabwe under-19 cricket team on 3 April 2025, in a youth one-day international against Ireland. His twin brother, Michael, made his debut for Zimbabwe U19 in the same match. In a match during that series on April 5, he top scored for Zimbabwe with 68 from 98 balls whilst batting at No.3. Later that month, he made his list-A cricket debut for Zimbabwe A against Scotland, scoring 47.

Blignaut and his twin brother became the first set of twins for Harare based Takashinga Cricket Club in June 2025.

He was named in the Zimbabwe U19 team for the 2026 Under-19 Men's Cricket World Cup at the age of 17 years-old. In a warm-up match for the tournament, he scored an unbeaten 110 which included a century partnership with his twin brother, Michael, against Mid West Rhinos.

== Personal life ==
He is the son of former international cricketer Andy Blignaut. His twin brother Michael is also a cricketer. He attended Cornwall Hill College in South Africa.
