= History of cricket in Zimbabwe from 1992 =

This article describes the history of cricket in Zimbabwe from the 1992–93 season when the country was promoted to full membership of the International Cricket Council (ICC).

== Events ==
Zimbabwe was elected to full membership of the ICC in 1992, and played its inaugural Test match versus India at the Harare Sports Club on 18–22 October 1992. The match was drawn, and thus Zimbabwe became the first team to avoid losing its inaugural Test match since Australia beat England in the very first Test in 1877.

The main domestic competition is the Logan Cup which has a long history but which did not acquire first-class status until the 1993–94 season.

Cricket in Zimbabwe was severely impacted by the country's political situation in the early years of the 21st century and the situation has become critical since 2005. See: Zimbabwean cricket crisis.

== National championships ==
Winners of the Logan Cup from 1993 have been:

- 1992–93 – not a first-class competition
- 1993–94 – Mashonaland Under-24
- 1994–95 – Mashonaland
- 1995–96 – Matabeleland
- 1996–97 – Mashonaland
- 1997–98 – Mashonaland
- 1998–99 – Matabeleland
- 1999–00 – Mashonaland
- 2000–01 – Mashonaland
- 2001–02 – Mashonaland
- 2002–03 – Mashonaland
- 2003–04 – Mashonaland
- 2004–05 – Mashonaland

== Leading players by season ==
The lists below give the leading runscorers and wicket-takers in each domestic season.

=== Batsmen ===
- 1992–93 – KJ Arnott – 281 @ 56.20 (HS 101*)
- 1993–94 – A Flower – 620 @ 68.88 (HS 215)
- 1994–95 – GW Flower – 983 @ 57.82 (HS 201*)
- 1995–96 – DL Houghton – 599 @ 85.57 (HS 160)
- 1996–97 – GW Flower – 477 @ 53.00 (HS 243*)
- 1997–98 – GW Flower – 742 @ 74.20 (HS 156*)
- 1998–99 – A Flower – 469 @ 156.33 (HS 194*)
- 1999–00 – GJ Rennie – 666 @ 47.57 (HS 152)
- 2000–01 – GJ Whittall – 532 @ 88.66 (HS 188*)
- 2001–02 – BB Sijapati – 692 @ 230.66 (HS 199*)
- 2002–03 – MA Vermeulen – 696 @ 49.71 (HS 153)
- 2003–04 – GM Strydom – 681 @ 61.90 (HS 216)
- 2004–05 – DD Ebrahim – 710 @ 54.61 (HS 188)

=== Bowlers ===
- 1992–93 – AJ Traicos – 11 @ 34.18 (BB 5-86)
- 1993–94 – JA Rennie – 23 @ 28.30 (BB 6-34)
- 1994–95 – HH Streak – 49 @ 19.77 (BB 6-90)
- 1995–96 – BC Strang – 36 @ 21.41 (BB 6-96)
- 1996–97 – PA Strang – 36 @ 25.16 (BB 5-45)
- 1997–98 – AG Huckle – 22 @ 31.31 (BB 6-109)
- 1998–99 – AR Whittall – 16 @ 27.31 (BB 4-49)
- 1999–00 – GB Brent – 30 @ 17.86 (BB 6-84)
- 2000–01 – BT Watambwa – 34 @ 17.82 (BB 5-36)
- 2001–02 – RW Price – 36 @ 22.63 (BB 8-35)
- 2002–03 – RW Price – 32 @ 33.18 (BB 8-78)
- 2003–04 – RW Price – 42 @ 21.30 (BB 6-73)
- 2004–05 – NB Mahwire – 45 @ 18.33 (BB 7-64)

== International tours of Zimbabwe from 1992-93 to 2005-06 ==
=== India 1992-93 ===
- 1st Test at Harare Sports Club – match drawn

=== New Zealand 1992-93 ===
- 1st Test at Bulawayo Athletic Club – match drawn
- 2nd Test at Harare Sports Club – New Zealand won by 177 runs

=== Pakistan 1994-95 ===
- 1st Test at Harare Sports Club – Zimbabwe won by an innings and 64 runs
- 2nd Test at Queens Sports Club, Bulawayo – Pakistan won by 8 wickets
- 3rd Test at Harare Sports Club – Pakistan won by 99 runs

=== South Africa 1995-96 ===
- 1st Test at Harare Sports Club – South Africa won by 7 wickets

=== England 1996-97 ===
- 1st Test at Queens Sports Club, Bulawayo – match drawn
- 2nd Test at Harare Sports Club – match drawn

=== India 1996-97 ===
The Indian team played three limited overs internationals only, out of which India lost all 3 of them at the Harare Sporting Club. The team members included Eddo Brandes, Paul Strang, Alistair Campbell, Andy Flower, Grant Flower, Anthony Ireland, Heath Streak, Guy Whittal, Craig Wishart, Andy Blignaut, A Huckle, G Rennie and M Mbangwa.

=== New Zealand 1997-98 ===
- 1st Test at Harare Sports Club – match drawn
- 2nd Test at Queens Sports Club, Bulawayo – match drawn

=== Pakistan 1997-98 ===
- 1st Test at Queens Sports Club, Bulawayo – match drawn
- 2nd Test at Harare Sports Club – Pakistan won by 3 wickets

=== India 1998-99 ===
- 1st Test at Harare Sports Club – Zimbabwe won by 61 runs

=== Australia 1999-2000 ===
- 1st Test at Harare Sports Club – Australia won by 10 wickets

=== England 1999-2000 ===
The England team played a series of four limited overs internationals only

=== South Africa 1999-2000 ===
- 1st Test at Harare Sports Club – South Africa won by an innings and 219 runs

=== Sri Lanka 1999-2000 ===
- 1st Test at Queens Sports Club, Bulawayo – match drawn
- 2nd Test at Harare Sports Club – Sri Lanka won by 6 wickets
- 3rd Test at Harare Sports Club – match drawn

=== Bangladesh 2000-01 ===
- 1st Test at Queens Sports Club, Bulawayo – Zimbabwe won by an innings and 43 runs
- 2nd Test at Harare Sports Club – Zimbabwe won by 8 wickets

=== New Zealand 2000-01 ===
- 1st Test at Queens Sports Club, Bulawayo – New Zealand won by 7 wickets
- 2nd Test at Harare Sports Club – New Zealand won by 8 wickets

=== India 2001 ===
- 1st Test at Queens Sports Club, Bulawayo – India won by 8 wickets
- 2nd Test at Harare Sports Club – Zimbabwe won by 4 wickets

=== West Indies 2001 ===
- 1st Test at Queens Sports Club, Bulawayo – West Indies won by an innings and 176 runs
- 2nd Test at Harare Sports Club – match drawn

=== South Africa 2001-02 ===
- 1st Test at Harare Sports Club – South Africa won by 9 wickets
- 2nd Test at Queens Sports Club, Bulawayo – match drawn

=== England 2001-02 ===
The England team played a series of five limited overs internationals only

=== Australia 2002 ===
The tour was cancelled for security reasons

- 1st Test at Harare Sports Club – game abandoned
- 2nd Test at Queens Sports Club, Bulawayo – game abandoned

=== Pakistan 2002-03 ===
- 1st Test at Harare Sports Club – Pakistan won by 119 runs
- 2nd Test at Queens Sports Club, Bulawayo – Pakistan won by 10 wickets

=== Bangladesh 2003-04 ===
- 1st Test at Harare Sports Club – Zimbabwe won by 183 runs
- 2nd Test at Queens Sports Club, Bulawayo – match drawn

=== West Indies 2003-04 ===
- 1st Test at Harare Sports Club – match drawn
- 2nd Test at Queens Sports Club, Bulawayo – West Indies won by 128 runs

=== Sri Lanka 2004 ===
- 1st Test at Harare Sports Club – Sri Lanka won by an innings and 240 runs
- 2nd Test at Queens Sports Club, Bulawayo – Sri Lanka won by an innings and 254 runs

=== Australia 2004 ===
The Australians played a series of three limited overs internationals only

=== England 2004-05 ===
The England team played a series of five limited overs internationals only

=== New Zealand 2005-06 ===
- 1st Test at Harare Sports Club – New Zealand won by an innings and 294 runs
- 2nd Test at Queens Sports Club, Bulawayo – New Zealand won by an innings and 46 runs

=== India 2005-06 ===
- 1st Test at Queens Sports Club, Bulawayo – India won by an innings and 90 runs
- 2nd Test at Harare Sports Club – India won by 10 wickets

== Bibliography ==
- Wisden Cricketers Almanack 2006

== External sources ==
- ZimbabweCricket
- CricketArchive – List of Tournaments in Zimbabwe
