= Nathan Astle =

New Zealand cricketer

Nathan Astle MNZM
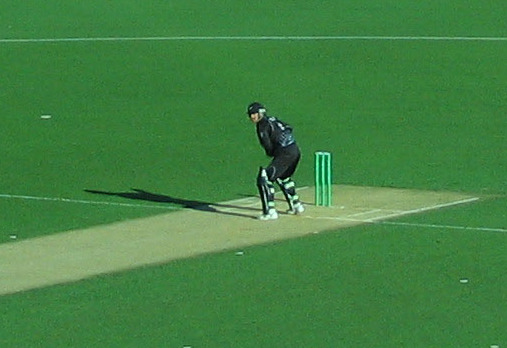
- Astle batting against Australia in 2006

Personal information
- Full name: Nathan John Astle
- Born: 15 September 1971 (age 55); Christchurch, New Zealand
- Batting: Right-handed
- Bowling: Right-arm medium
- Role: Batsman
- Relatives: Lisa Astle (sister); Robbie Frew (brother-in-law)

International information
- National side: New Zealand (1995–2007)
- Test debut (cap 197): 13 January 1996 v Zimbabwe
- Last Test: 15 December 2006 v Sri Lanka
- ODI debut (cap 93): 22 January 1995 v West Indies
- Last ODI: 23 January 2007 v England
- ODI shirt no.: 9
- T20I debut (cap 12): 21 October 2005 v South Africa
- Last T20I: 26 December 2006 v Sri Lanka

Domestic team information
- Years: Team
- 1991/92–2006/07: Canterbury
- 1997: Nottinghamshire
- 2005: Durham
- 2006: Lancashire

Career statistics
Competition	Test	ODI	FC	LA
Matches	81	223	171	377
Runs scored	4,702	7,090	9,321	11,635
Batting average	37.02	34.92	37.58	35.58
100s/50s	11/24	16/41	19/50	26/64
Top score	222	145*	223	145*
Balls bowled	5,688	4,850	13,441	10,884
Wickets	51	99	150	244
Bowling average	42.01	38.47	32.64	30.31
5 wickets in innings	0	0	2	0
10 wickets in match	0	0	0	0
Best bowling	3/27	4/43	6/22	4/14
Catches/stumpings	70/–	83/–	134/–	146/–
Medal record
Men's cricket
Representing New Zealand
ICC Champions Trophy
Winner	2000 Kenya
Commonwealth Games
Third place	1998 Kuala Lumpur
- Source: ESPNcricinfo, 11 November 2008

Nathan John Astle MNZM (born 15 September 1971) is a former New Zealand cricketer, who played all formats of the game. A right-handed batsman who played as an opener in One Day Internationals (ODI), while batting in the middle order in Test matches. In a career that spanned 12 years, Astle played 81 Tests and 223 ODIs accumulating 4,702 and 7,090 runs respectively. As of 2022, he is New Zealand's fourth-most prolific run scorer. Astle collected 154 wickets with his medium-paced bowling at the international level. He holds two records – scoring the fastest double century in Test cricket and the second highest individual score in the fourth innings of a Test match. Both the records were achieved when he made 222 against England in Christchurch in 2002. Astle was a member of the New Zealand team that won the 2000 ICC KnockOut Trophy. His innings of 145 not out was the highest individual score by a batsman in the ICC Champions Trophy, which he scored in the 2004 tournament until it was broken by Ben Duckett in 2025 against Australia when he scored 165.

Astle has played county cricket in England for Derbyshire, Durham and Nottinghamshire, and played domestically for Canterbury.

== Personal life ==
Astle was born in Christchurch, New Zealand, where he is still based; he is married to Kelly Astle and has two children. Astle and his wife Kelly run a childcare centre for which he is the director. His sister, Lisa Astle, represented the New Zealand women's team at the 1993 World Cup, and later married another first-class cricketer, Robbie Frew.

== Domestic career ==
Born in 1971 at Christchurch, Astle joined the East Christchurch-Shirley Cricket Club, a cricket club that would produce cricketers like Bruce Taylor, Craig McMillan and Michael Papps. He used to bat at number 6, and played as a batsman who could bowl medium pace. During the 1990–91 season, Astle was selected to play for "New Zealand Young Cricketers" against "England Young Cricketers". Astle managed just 127 runs at an average of 31.75 in the three match series. The following year, Astle made his First-class debut for Canterbury against Central Districts. He hardly managed to score runs at the end of the first three seasons. During the 1994–95 season he aggregated 663 runs at an average of 55.25. He played three important innings during the season – 96 against Auckland, 175 against Northern Districts and 191 against Wellington. Following impressive performances in the season, he was noticed by the New Zealand selectors.

On 31 May 2006, Lancashire announced that Astle would be a short-term overseas replacement for Australian player Brad Hodge. In 2007 he played for Longton C.C in Staffordshire. He was a part of the Mumbai Champs team in the inaugural 20/20 Tournament of the now defunct Indian Cricket League (ICL).

== International career ==
=== Debut years ===
Astle was selected for the ODI series against West Indies in 1995. He was again selected for the series against Sri Lanka where's he scored 95 in one of the matches thus enabling New Zealand level the series and ending their losing streak after 13 matches. It was under the insistence of Glenn Turner, then coach of New Zealand, Astle was selected for the Test side and started playing as an opener in ODIs. He was again selected for a five match ODI series in India. In the first four matches, he failed to score, but in the final match he recorded his first ODI century scoring 114 off 128 balls. New Zealand won the match and Astle was declared "man of the match", in spite of New Zealand losing the series 3–2. The following year Astle made his Test debut against Zimbabwe at Trust Bank Park, Hamilton. In the ODI series, Astle scored a century in the first match and was named "man of the match". All in all, he scored 168 runs in the series averaging 56.00. Following that, Astle was named in the New Zealand squad for the 1996 Cricket World Cup that was held in India, Pakistan and Sri Lanka. He scored his first World Cup hundred in new Zealand's opening match, against England, of the tournament. However, Astle failed to score runs in the rest of the tournament, eventually ended up with 111 runs at an average of 18.5.

Following his dismal performance at the World Cup, Astle was selected for the two match Test series in West Indies. This was his second series after the one against Zimbabwe at home. Until then, he managed just 77 runs in four innings at an average of 19.25, In the first Test at Kensington Oval, he scored 54 (48 balls) and 125 in both innings of the Test. In the second innings he was involved in a partnership of 144 runs with Justin Vaughan for the fifth wicket, a record for New Zealand then. In spite of his performance in the match, New Zealand lost the match by ten wickets. He continued his good form with the bat as he scored 103 in the second Test, enabling New Zealand draw the match, although they lost the series 1–0. In the following year, Astle scored 106 against England in the 1st Test of the three–match series. He was involved in a partnership of 106 for the tenth wicket with Danny Morrison, a New Zealand record. His partnership with Morrison helped New Zealand secure a draw and prevented England from winning the test match.

=== Successful opener in ODIs ===
Astle was New Zealand's top run scorer in the 1997 Pepsi Independence Cup, a quadrangular tournament that also included India, Sri Lanka and Pakistan. In the first match against Pakistan, he scored 117 and took a career-best figure of four wickets for 43 runs; New Zealand won the match by 22 runs while Astle was named Man of the match. He followed that with 92 against India, a match which New Zealand lost. Although, New Zealand did not progress to the finals, Astle ended up as the fourth-most prolific run scorer with 218 runs at an average of 72.66. He was equally successful with the ball as he captured seven wickets at an average of 15.00. Astle also passed Martin Crowe's record number of one-day hundreds for New Zealand (four) during the tournament.

Astle's success as opener in ODIs continued throughout the season. In a home series against Zimbabwe, he was more consistent, scoring 351 runs including a century. He made scores exceeding 60 in four consecutive matches and was ultimately named "man of the series". Astle performed well in the subsequent series' such as the Singer-Akai Nidahas Trophy (1998) and the home series against South Africa accumulating close to 600 runs.

=== 1999 World Cup failure ===
Although, Astle was consistent till 1999, he failed in the 1999 Cricket World Cup that took place in England. He managed just 79 runs in nine matches at an average of 8.77. he scored well in the Test series against England including a century. At the end of the century, Astle established himself as one of the key players in New Zealand.

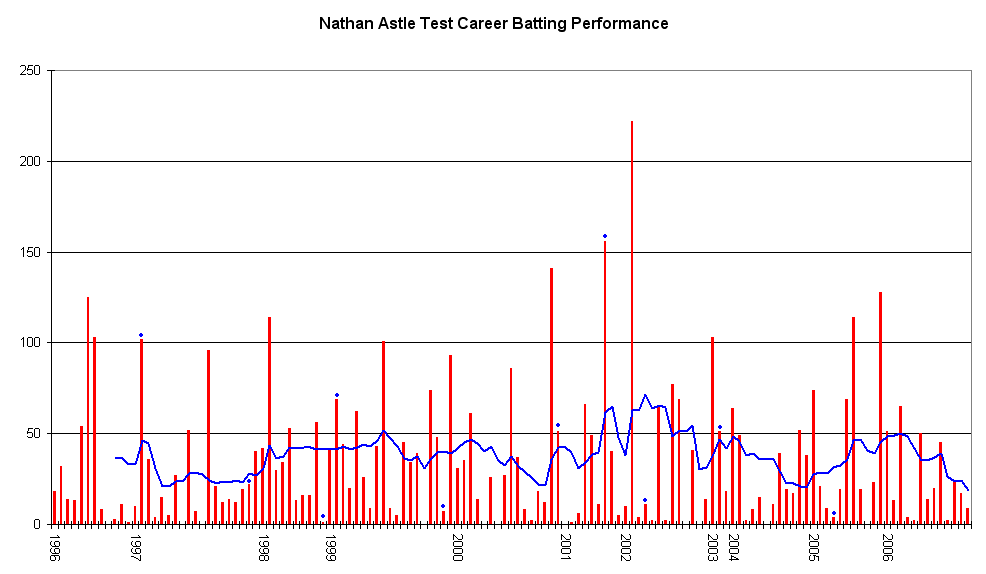
An innings-by-innings breakdown of Astle's Test match batting career, showing runs scored (red bars) and the average of the last ten innings (blue line).

At the end of 2000, New Zealand suffered heavy losses in the Test series against South Africa. Astle made a strong comeback in the ODI series against Pakistan, scoring 240 runs. In the final match of the series, he made 119 off 116 balls that contained 21 fours. During the innings he was involved in a record stand of 193 for the first wicket with captain Stephen Fleming. It helped New Zealand win the series. In the rain-affected 2001–02 Trans-Tasman Trophy against Australia, Astle scored moderately in the first two Tests and came back with a valiant 156 not out in the third Test. Though New Zealand had their upper hand throughout the series, it ended in a draw. In the tour he made a career best First-class score of 223 against Queensland. Following that, England visited New Zealand to play five ODIs and three Test matches. In the ODI series, he fared well scoring 221 runs in five innings at an average of 73.66 including a century in the last match. In the first Test, chasing a target of 550 runs, Astle batted at number five went on to make 222, his highest Test score. he set the record for the fastest double-century when he reached the landmark in 153 balls. He took 168 balls hitting 28 fours and 11 sixes before being the last man to be dismissed. During the innings he was involved in a partnership of 118 runs with injured Chris Cairns. Despite this New Zealand lost the match by 98 runs. As of 2013, it remains the second highest score by a player in the fourth innings of a Test match.

=== 2003 World Cup and return ===
Astle made a remarkable comeback to the 2003 World Cup after disastrous performances in the previous two editions that appeared. He scored a century, second in World Cups, against Zimbabwe and finished the tournament with 213 runs from seven matches at an average of 42.60. Immediately following the World Cup, New Zealand toured India to play two Test matches. In the first Test at Ahmedabad, Astle scored 103, when New Zealand were struggling thus helping them save the match. The following year Astle went on to record his highest ODI score when he made 145 not out against USA at the ICC Champions Trophy 2004. By this time, his Test average dipped down; he went on to make only two more hundreds till the end of his career, including one against Zimbabwe. However, he continued his good form in ODIs. In August 2005, he made an unbeaten 115 against India at the final of the Videocon Tri-Series that was held in Zimbabwe. New Zealand won the tournament and Astle was adjudged "player of the match".

During the 2005 Chappell–Hadlee Series and the preceding tour to South Africa, Astle incurred media criticism along with fellow New Zealand cricket team teammates Craig McMillan, Hamish Marshall and James Marshall, for a slump in form. As a result of this, he was dropped from the national team. However he returned to the side in 2006 for the home series against West Indies. He scored 118 not out at Christchurch, and ended up as New Zealand's leading run scorer of the tournament. Over the New Zealand summer, he scored 690 ODI runs from 11 matches at an average of 54.2. He received the "2005–2006 Walter Hadlee Trophy for Best New Zealand One-Day International batsman".

=== Retirement ===
While expected to make his fourth World Cup appearance, Astle announced his retirement from international cricket, while he was playing in the Commonwealth Bank Series, on 26 January 2007. He cited lack of motivation and his "patchy form" in the recent matches as reasons for retiring.

"I have been fighting this day for about eight months. I so desperately wanted to go to my fourth World Cup, but deep down inside I knew that I was lacking motivation and the enjoyment levels were just not there."

— Astle on his retirement from international cricket.

He played his last One-Day International on 23 January 2007 against England at the Adelaide Oval.

== Playing style and influences ==
Astle has been described as the best ODI batsman New Zealand has ever produced. Apart from his role as a batsman, he was also an occasional partnership-breaking medium-pace bowler and a competent slip fielder. Because of this multi-utility option, he always enjoyed selection in the team, but his laid-back attitude resulted in him never being considered for the captaincy, despite his seniority.

== Outside cricket ==
Astle has also been a competent soccer player, playing for Rangers A.F.C. in Christchurch, a club which also at one time had fellow cricketer Sir Richard Hadlee among its players. Astle also took up Auto racing in early 2010, competing predominantly at Woodford Glen Speedway, Christchurch, driving a Modified Sprint. Astle moved to full-sized Sprintcars after two seasons in a Modified Sprint, and has since competed in numerous speedway events across New Zealand.

== Honours and awards ==
The New Zealand Cricket Almanack named him the "Player of the Year" on three occasions – 1995, 1996 and 2002. For his efforts, Astle received the "Player of the Year" award in 1998. He was also named New Zealand's "One-Day International Batsman of the Year" in 2006. In the 2007 Queen's Birthday Honours, Astle was appointed a Member of the New Zealand Order of Merit, for services to cricket.

== Coaching career ==
In 2009, Astle announced his intentions to make a career of coaching, and was appointed the head coach role of the Burnside West Christchurch University Cricket Club, a senior club in the Christchurch Metropolitan league, playing under the Canterbury Cricket Association.
