= Sajjadul Hasan =

Bangladeshi cricketer (1978–2007)

Personal information
- Full name: Mohammad Sajjadul Hasan
- Born: 25 September 1978; Khulna, Bangladesh
- Died: 16 March 2007 (aged 28); Kartikdanga, Bangladesh
- Nickname: Setu

Domestic team information
- Years: Team
- 2000–2007: Khulna Division

Career statistics
Competition	First-class	List A
Matches	50	39
Runs scored	2,443	680
Batting average	28.08	18.37
100s/50s	3/12	1/2
Top score	147	106 not out
Balls bowled	444	690
Wickets	4	17
Bowling average	56.50	30.64
5 wickets in innings	–	0
10 wickets in match	–	n/a
Best bowling	2/45	4/17
Catches/stumpings	25/1	18/–
- Source: CricketArchive, 5 September 2009

Mohammad Sajjadul Hasan (25 September 1978 – 16 March 2007) was a Bangladeshi first-class cricketer.

Nicknamed 'Setu', he was an opening or top-order batsman for Khulna Division. Hasan was the leading runscorer in the 2002–03 Bangladeshi domestic season with 447 runs at 40.63.

He captained Khulna Division on two occasions in the first-class format, against Rajshahi Division and Chittagong Division, but lost both games. He also has a stumping to his name, claimed during Khulna Division's match against Chittagong Division in 2005.

He died aged 28 in a road accident alongside his Khulna Division teammate and Bangladesh Test cricketer Manjural Islam Rana. In his 50-game career he made 2443 runs at 28.08 with 3 hundreds.
