= Manjural Islam Rana =

Bangladeshi cricketer (1984–2007)

Personal information
- Full name: Qazi Manjural Islam
- Born: 4 May 1984; Mujgunni, Khulna, Bangladesh
- Died: 16 March 2007 (aged 22); Kartikdanga, Khulna, Bangladesh
- Nickname: Rana
- Batting: Left-handed
- Bowling: Left-arm orthodox spin

International information
- National side: Bangladesh (2003–2006)
- Test debut (cap 35): 19 February 2004 v Zimbabwe
- Last Test: 20 December 2004 v India
- ODI debut (cap 69): 7 November 2003 v England
- Last ODI: 25 March 2006 v Kenya
- ODI shirt no.: 96

Domestic team information
- Years: Team
- 2000/01–2006/07: Khulna Division

Career statistics
Competition	Test	ODI	FC	LA
Matches	6	25	46	65
Runs scored	257	331	2,466	869
Batting average	25.70	20.68	36.26	19.75
100s/50s	0/1	0/1	4/8	0/3
Top score	69	63	151	76*
Balls bowled	749	996	8,164	2,944
Wickets	5	23	127	85
Bowling average	80.20	29.95	25.97	21.72
5 wickets in innings	0	0	7	0
10 wickets in match	0	0	1	0
Best bowling	3/84	4/34	7/82	4/9
Catches/stumpings	3/–	6/–	32/–	21/–
- Source: Cricinfo, 16 March 2007

Manjural Islam Rana (4 May 1984 – 16 March 2007), also known as Qazi Manjural Islam, was a Bangladeshi cricketer who played six Tests and 25 One Day Internationals for Bangladesh. Born in Khulna, he was a slow left-arm orthodox spin bowler. He played for Khulna Division at domestic level and made his One Day International (ODI) debut in November 2003 against England. Three months later, Rana played his first Test against Zimbabwe. On 16 March 2007, he died of severe head injuries sustained in a road accident in Khulna at the age of 22.

== Cricket career ==
=== Early career ===
Rana made his first-class debut on 22 November 2000, playing for Khulna Division against Barisal Division. His first wicket was that of Towhid Hossain, bowled, but he did not bat in the match. In his next first-class match, against Dhaka Metropolis for Khulna, Rana batted for the first time; he scored 8 and 18 not out. In the match, 19 other players made their first-class debut as this was the first match for both Khulna and Dhaka in Bangladesh's new National Cricket League. Rana made his one-day debut the same month; on 25 November 2000, he played for Khulna against Barisal Division. He scored 22 runs in the match and took three wickets for 20 runs. Once again, Rana was one of 20 people to debut in the match in the new Ispahani Mirzapore Tea One-Day League. In his first season with Khulna, Rana played 10 first-class matches, scoring 299 runs at 24.91 and taking 35 wickets at 20.14. He also played the same number of one-day matches, scoring 70 runs at 11.66 and taking 10 wickets at 26.00.

In the 2001–02 season, Rana played just two first-class and two one-day matches, with little success compared to the previous year. He experienced more success in 2002–03, playing in six first-class and one-day matches respectively. Rana scored 390 runs at 48.75 in the former, including four half-centuries. He took 27 wickets at 20.00 with the ball and in the latter one-day matches, Rana scored 28 runs at 5.60 and took 18 wickets at 9.55. During the 2003 English cricket season, he represented the Old Mid-Whitgiftians in the Surrey Championship. Rana was chosen to be part of the Bangladesh A squad that toured Pakistan in 2003–04.

=== International breakthrough ===
Between 30 January 2003 and 8 February 2005, Rana played no domestic cricket. Rana made his ODI debut against England in Chittagong on 7 November 2003, in the first match of a three-match ODI series. Filling in for fellow spinner Mohammad Rafique, he dismissed Michael Vaughan with just his third ball of the match and became the first Bangladeshi to take a wicket in his first international over. Rana played in all three matches as Bangladesh lost the series 3–0; the wicket in his first over of international cricket was his only one of the series and he scored 46 runs at an average of 23.00.

In December 2003, Rana was part of the Bangladesh A squad that toured in Pakistan, playing in both the Pakistan Cricket Board (PCB) Patron's Cup and the PCB Patron's Trophy. Rana made his Test debut on 19 February 2004, playing against Zimbabwe as part of Bangladesh's tour of the country. He bowled 20.2 overs in the match, taking two wickets for 66 runs. His first Test wicket was that of Sean Ervine, caught by Tapash Baisya. Rana batted twice in the match, making scores of 35 not out and 32. Bangladesh lost the match by 183 runs and Rana stayed in the team for the second match. He batted once, scoring 39 and bowled just six overs in a match curtailed by the weather. The result of the Test was a draw, ensuring Bangladesh lost the series 1–0 to Zimbabwe. Rana finished the series as Bangladesh's leading batsman, with the most runs (105) and the highest batting average (52.50) for the team.

In April 2004, Rana was given a "rookie contract" with the Bangladesh Cricket Board (BCB); the six-month contract provided him with a basic salary, lower than that of senior players. When Bangladesh toured the West Indies in May–June 2004, he took 3/21 in 10 overs in an ODI in Kingstown, Saint Vincent. In the match, Rana opened the batting and ran out the West Indian wicket-keeper Ridley Jacobs as Bangladesh lost by one wicket. He played in all the matches of the three-match series and topped the batting averages for Bangladesh, with 40 runs at an average of 40.00. He also took five wickets at 14.00, putting him second in Bangladesh's bowling averages. On the same tour, Rana played his third Test match for Bangladesh. In the match, which the West Indies won by an innings and 99 runs, Rana made scores of 7 and 35, taking no wickets while conceding 100 runs.

=== Dropped from the Test team ===
When Zimbabwe toured Bangladesh in January 2005, Rana was twice man of the match in the ODI series. In the fourth match of the series, he took his career-best figures of 4/34. He played in four matches of the five match series, scoring 37 runs at 18.50 and taking 9 wickets at 15.22, finishing as Bangladesh's lead wicket-taker for the series.

Although he would later represent Khulna in first-class matches, Rana's last one-day match for them was on 9 March 2006.

=== Return to domestic cricket ===
After playing his last ODI in March 2006, Rana played four more one-day matches, all for Bangladesh A. At the same time, he continued to represent Khulna Division in first-class cricket. In the Bangladesh 2006–07 cricket season, Rana played 10 first-class matches, in which he scored 571 runs at 35.68, made two centuries and took 34 wickets at 18.85. The 10 first-class matches included one fixture in which he represented Bangladesh A against Zimbabwe A. The last match Rana played was a first-class match against Dhaka Division. He captained his side in the match, which Khulna lost, although he took 9 wickets in the match.

== Death ==
Two months before his death, Rana was involved in a motorcycle crash from which he emerged unharmed. Aged 22, Rana died in an accident on 16 March 2007 in Dumuria Upazila, Khulna, while the Bangladesh cricket team were in the Caribbean for the 2007 Cricket World Cup. The accident happened when his motorcycle collided with a microbus and then hit an electrical pole at the side of the road. Sajjadul Hasan, who was a cricketer for Khulna Division, was also killed in the accident. The then Bangladesh captain, Habibul Bashar, said "It's shocking news for all of us, he was a friend and a team-mate. The boys are very upset."

Prior to their first World Cup match, the Bangladesh team declared that they would play in memory of Rana and held a one-minute silence in his memory before the start of play. They wore black arm bands during the match, in which they picked up an unexpected five-wicket victory over India. Bangladesh captain Habibul Bashar dedicated the win to Rana. At the end of the match he walked around the ground, holding a picture of Rana and acknowledged the Bangladeshi spectators. Rana's death at the age of 22 years, 316 days makes him the youngest ever Test cricketer to die. Additionally, he and Bashar formerly held the record for the highest fourth-wicket partnership for Bangladesh in Tests when on 4 June 2004, they posted a 120-run stand against the West Indies cricket team.

In 2009, the BCB set up a welfare trust for current and former players, as well as staff and officials associated with it. As part of the scheme, all the proceeds from the ticket sales for the first ODI between Bangladesh and Zimbabwe in 2009 were given to Rana's family.

On 4 May 2021, Bangladesh Cricket Board received backlash and criticism for its bizarre tweet by mentioning Manjural Islam Rana as the youngest ever Test cricketer to die at the age of 22 on his birthday anniversary.
