= Kudzai Taibu =

Zimbabwean cricketer

Personal information
- Full name: Kudzai James Taibu
- Born: November 20, 1984; Harare, Zimbabwe
- Batting: Right-handed
- Role: Batsman
- Relatives: Tatenda Taibu (brother)

Domestic team information
- Years: Team
- 2001/02: Mashonaland
- 2003/04: Manicaland

Career statistics
Competition	FC
Matches	6
Runs scored	103
Batting average	11.44
100s/50s	0/0
Top score	40*
Catches/stumpings	4/1
- Source: Cricket Archive, 5 December 2025

Kudzai James Taibu (born 20 November 1984) is a former Zimbabwean cricketer who represented Mashonaland and Manicaland in Zimbabwean domestic cricket. He played as a right-handed top-order batsman and occasional wicket-keeper.

Taibu was born in Harare. His older brother, Tatenda Taibu, captained the Zimbabwean national team. Taibu himself represented Zimbabwe at under-15 level. He made his first-class debut for Mashonaland in February 2002, aged 17, playing against Matabeleland in the 2001–02 Logan Cup. He played one more match during that season, and then played twice for Manicaland in the 2003–04 Logan Cup. In 2006, during the Zimbabwean cricket crisis, Taibu played two matches for Zimbabwe A against Bangladesh A. Those were his final first-class appearances.
