= Mahbubur Rahman (cricketer) =

Bangladeshi cricketer (born 1969)

Personal information
- Born: 1 February 1969 (age 57); Mymensingh, East Pakistan (present-day Bangladesh)
- Batting: Right-handed
- Bowling: -

International information
- National side: Bangladesh
- Only ODI (cap 47): 25 March 1999 v Zimbabwe
- Source: ESPNcricinfo, 13 February 2006

Mahbubur Rahman (born 1 February 1969) is a former Bangladeshi cricketer who played in one One Day International in 1999. In the 1980s Mymensingh was a great hub for producing cricketing talent in Bangladesh. Mahbubur Rahman, also known as Selim, was one of the finest talents to come from there. A right-handed middle order batsman, he occasionally bowled spin as well. In the 1989 Under-19 Asia Cup, he scored 40 against Sri Lanka and 28 against Pakistan. Unfortunately he took too long to make the transformation to the senior team. Thus he played in only one ODI, against Zimbabwe, at Dhaka in 1999.
