= List of Namibia national cricket captains =

This is a list of all cricketers who have captained Namibia in an official international match. This includes the ICC Trophy, Under-19 games and One Day Internationals. The article is correct as of 26 June 2023.

== One Day Internationals ==
Namibia played their first ODI on February 10, 2003.

Namibian ODI Captains
Number	Name	Year	Played	Won	Tied	Lost	No Result
1	Deon Kotze	2003	6	0	0	6	0
2	Gerhard Erasmus	2019–2023	40	22	0	17	1
3	JJ Smit	2021	2	1	0	1	0
Overall			48	23	0	24	1

== Twenty20 Internationals ==
Namibia played their first T20I on May 20, 2019.

Namibian T20I Captains
Number	Name	Year	Played	Won	Tied	Lost	No Result
1	Stephan Baard	2019	1	1	0	0	0
2	Gerhard Erasmus	2019	40	26	0	14	0
3	JJ Smit	2024	4	1	0	2	1
3	Jan Nicol Loftie-Eaton	2024	1	0	0	0	0
Overall			45	28	0	16	1

== ICC Trophy ==
Namibia debuted in the ICC Trophy in the 1993/94 tournament

Namibian ICC Trophy Captains
Number	Name	Year	Played	Won	Tied	Lost	No Result
1	Lennie Louw	1994	8	5	0	3	0
2	Ian Stevenson	1997	3	1	0	2	0
3	Daniel Keulder	1997–2001	11	8	0	3	0
4	Stephan Swanepoel	2001	1	1	0	0	0
5	Deon Kotze	2005	7	3	0	4	0
6	Louis Burger	2009	10	3	0	7	0
7	Sarel Burger	2014	7	3	0	4	0
Overall			47	24	0	23	0

== Youth One-Day International captains ==
This is a list of Namibian cricketers who have captained their country in an Under-19's ODI.

Namibian Under 19's Captains
Number	Name	Year	Played	Won	Tied	Lost	No Result
1	Duane Viljoen	1998	9	0	0	5	0
2	Jan-Berrie Burger	2000	6	0	1	5	0
3	Stephan Swanepoel	2002	7	3	0	4	0
4	Stephanus Ackermann	2006	5	1	0	4	0
5	Dawid Botha	2008	4	1	0	3	0
6	Louis van der Westhuizen	2008	1	0	0	1	0
7	Stephan Baard	2012	6	0	0	6	0
8	Gerhard Erasmus	2014	6	1	0	5	0
9	Zane Green	2016	6	3	0	3	0
10	Lo-handre Louwrens	2018	6	1	0	5	0
Overall			53	10	1	42	0
