= Robbie Frew =

New Zealand cricketer (born 1970)

Personal information
- Born: 28 December 1970 (age 55); Darfield, New Zealand
- Source: Cricinfo, 15 October 2020

Robert Mathew Frew (born 28 December 1970) is a New Zealand former cricketer. He played in 35 first-class and 10 List A matches for Canterbury from 1995 to 2003.

== See also ==
- List of Canterbury representative cricketers
