= Barney Rogers =

Zimbabwean cricketer

Personal information
- Full name: Barney Guy Rogers
- Born: 20 August 1982 (age 44); Harare, Zimbabwe
- Batting: Left-handed
- Bowling: Right-arm off-break

International information
- National side: Zimbabwe (2002–2005)
- Test debut (cap 69): 6 January 2005 v Bangladesh
- Last Test: 11 March 2005 v South Africa
- ODI debut (cap 71): 23 November 2002 v Pakistan
- Last ODI: 2 March 2005 v South Africa

Career statistics
Competition	Test	ODI	FC	LA
Matches	4	15	36	47
Runs scored	90	478	1,980	1,097
Batting average	11.25	31.86	33.00	26.75
100s/50s	0/0	0/5	3/12	0/8
Top score	29	84	141	84*
Balls bowled	18	324	1,924	859
Wickets	0	6	33	21
Bowling average	–	53.50	36.93	39.14
5 wickets in innings	–	0	0	0
10 wickets in match	–	0	0	0
Best bowling	–	2/55	4/34	3/36
Catches/stumpings	1/–	7/–	23/–	15/–
- Source: Cricinfo, 11 October 2017

Barney Guy Rogers (born 20 August 1982) is a Zimbabwean former international cricketer. He played four Test matches and 15 One Day Internationals (ODIs) for the Zimbabwe national cricket team between 2002 and 2005 and first-class cricket in Zimbabwean domestic competitions. He played as a left-handed batsman who bowled occasional off-spin. Rogers was good enough at field hockey to play at under-20 level for Zimbabwe.

== Early career ==
Rogers was born at Harare into a cricketing family and was coached by his father from an early age. He is naturally right-handed but his father felt that the stronger hand should be used at the top of the handle and he coached Rogers to bat right-handed. He attended Brydon Country School and played in their 1st XI as an all-rounder alongside future international Sean Ervine. His secondary education was at St. John's College where he was captain of the 1st XI. He played in Zimbabwe under-13 and under-19 teams.

Rogers was admitted to the CFX Academy in 2001 and impressed head coach David Houghton, making his first-class cricket debut for the team playing as an opening batsman in the Logan Cup, scoring four fifties in five games.

== International career ==
His domestic form for Mashonaland led to Rogers making his ODI debut against Pakistan in November 2002. He was selected to tour England in 2003 but did not play well, scoring only 11 runs in the three first-class matches in which he played. He played ODIs against West Indies and Bangladesh in 2003 and 2004, scoring a pair of half-centuries against Bangladesh.

A dispute with the Zimbabwe Cricket Union meant that he played no part in the team for a period of time. He was one of the first players to settle agree terms with the Board and was selected to tour Bangladesh in 2005. He looked out of touch in the Test series but showed his quality in the ODI series, scoring three fifties and taking three wickets as Zimbabwe unluckily lost 2–3 after being two up. He was named as player of the series and went on to tour South Africa, his best score being 47 in the second ODI.

Another dispute over contracts led to Rogers having his contract cancelled by the ZCU in September 2005, Rogers being told that he had been "retired". He did not play any further international cricket and after the 2004/05 domestic season played in only three List A matches for Mashonaland Eagles in 2009.
