= Ryan Higgins (cricketer, born 1988) =

Zimbabwean cricketer

Personal information
- Full name: Ryan Shaun Higgins
- Born: 24 March 1988 (age 38); Harare, Zimbabwe
- Batting: Right-handed
- Bowling: Right-arm leg break
- Role: Spin bowler

International information
- National side: Zimbabwe
- ODI debut (cap 94): 26 February 2006 v Kenya
- Last ODI: 30 November 2006 v Bangladesh

Domestic team information
- Years: Team
- 2004–2005: Manicaland

Career statistics
Competition	ODI	FC	LA
Matches	11	3	14
Runs scored	15	40	22
Batting average	2.50	10.00	3.14
100s/50s	0/0	0/0	0/0
Top score	7*	20	7*
Balls bowled	544	336	671
Wickets	13	3	15
Bowling average	29.23	67.00	31.60
5 wickets in innings	0	0	0
10 wickets in match	0	0	0
Best bowling	4/21	2/99	4/21
Catches/stumpings	5/–	3/–	6/–
- Source: ESPNcricinfo, 7 July 2017

Ryan Shaun Higgins (born 24 March 1988) is a former Zimbabwean cricketer. He played 11 One Day Internationals for Zimbabwe in 2006, highlights include the wicket of Brian Lara and best bowling figures of 4/21 from 10 overs. Ryan Higgins retired from international cricket in 2007 at the age of 18. Higgins is now based in the Cotswolds and is now managing director of Gecko Cricket, the company he founded in 2012.
