= Gavin Ewing =

Zimbabwean cricketer (born 1981)

Personal information
- Full name: Gavin Mackie Ewing
- Born: 21 January 1981 (age 45); Harare, Zimbabwe
- Batting: Right-handed
- Bowling: Right-arm offbreak
- Role: All-rounder

International information
- National side: Zimbabwe
- Test debut (cap 58): 17 October 2003 v Australia
- Last Test: 13 September 2005 v India
- ODI debut (cap 85): 1 December 2004 v England
- Last ODI: 4 September 2005 v India

Domestic team information
- Years: Team
- 2002–2005: Matabeleland
- 2009–2013: Matabeleland Tuskers

Career statistics
Competition	Test	ODI	FC	LA
Matches	3	7	56	62
Runs scored	108	97	3,288	1,281
Batting average	18.00	13.85	40.09	27.25
100s/50s	0/1	0/0	7/19	1/6
Top score	71	46	212	106
Balls bowled	426	312	7,123	2,160
Wickets	2	5	98	43
Bowling average	130.00	47.20	34.25	35.16
5 wickets in innings	0	0	4	0
10 wickets in match	0	0	0	0
Best bowling	1/27	3/31	7/64	3/8
Catches/stumpings	1/–	3/–	26/–	22/–
- Source: ESPNcricinfo, 11 June 2015

Gavin Mackie Ewing (born 21 January 1981) is a Zimbabwean former cricketer. He is a right-handed batsman and bowls a right-arm offbreak. As a teenager, he spent a short time at Potchefstroom Boys High in South Africa before returning to Zimbabwe to complete his schooling at Falcon College in Esigodini.

He plays for Zimbabwe and Matabeleland. His current Test high batting score is 71, with an average of 18. He was initially called up for the 2003–04 tour in Australia, having previously played in the 1999 Under-19 World Cup and finished in the list of the top ten wicket players. He is a confident and aggressive middle-order batsman, and amongst the list of fifteen cricketers who had a coming together with the country's Cricket Union in 2004. He returned to the side in November of that year. In 2009, he spent a season playing cricket in Devon for Paignton CC, having a reasonable season before returning to Zimbabwe.
