= Keith Dabengwa =

Zimbabwean cricketer (born 1980)

Personal information
- Full name: Keith Mbusi Dabengwa
- Born: 17 August 1980 (age 46); Bulawayo, Zimbabwe
- Batting: Left-handed
- Bowling: Slow left-arm orthodox

International information
- National side: Zimbabwe
- Test debut (cap 71): 15 August 2005 v New Zealand
- Last Test: 20 September 2005 v India
- ODI debut (cap 89): 4 September 2005 v India
- Last ODI: 12 December 2010 v Bangladesh

Domestic team information
- Years: Team
- 1999/00–2005/06: Matabeleland (Westerns)
- 2000/01: CFX Academy
- 2006/07–2008/09: Westerns
- 2009/10–2015/16: Matabeleland Tuskers
- 2016/17: Bulawayo Metropolitan Tuskers

Career statistics
Competition	Test	ODI	FC	LA
Matches	3	37	109	123
Runs scored	90	514	4,944	1,811
Batting average	15.00	19.03	28.91	20.12
100s/50s	0/0	0/0	8/22	0/3
Top score	35	45	161	82*
Balls bowled	438	1,109	11,370	3,672
Wickets	5	23	148	99
Bowling average	49.80	40.69	39.72	28.88
5 wickets in innings	0	0	5	1
10 wickets in match	0	0	1	0
Best bowling	3/127	3/15	7/1	5/19
Catches/stumpings	1/–	12/–	104/–	52/–
- Source: CricInfo, 24 April 2020

Keith Mbusi Dabengwa (born 17 August 1980) is a Zimbabwean cricketer. He was appointed head coach of the Denmark national cricket team in October 2021.

Dabengwa is an all-rounder who made his First class debut for Matabeleland in 2000, taking 5 for 76, he then spent a season at the CFX Academy. He continued without many spectacular performances but in 2004/05 he got selected in Zimbabwe A squad for their tours of Namibia and Bangladesh. In the first match against Bangladesh A he took five wickets and scored 50 not out.

In 2005 Dabengwa scored his highest first class score of 161 against Midlands, his only century to date. Following this, he gained a place in the national squad and made his test debut against New Zealand in Bulawayo taking two wickets for 87 runs and scoring 21 runs starting his test account by scoring a six. He played in Zimbabwe's next two tests against India. Between those games there was a tri series with India and New Zealand in this Dabengwa made his ODI debut against India in Harare.

In one Logan Cup match in 2007 he took his career best innings figures of 7 for 1. They are the best bowling figures of anyone in first class history to have taken seven wickets in an innings. The record was previously held by Fred Spofforth who took 7 for 3. However, there have been inaccuracies in the scoreboards provided by Zimbabwe Cricket and thus a question mark exists over Dadengwa's feat.

Dabengwa played for Lymington Cricket Club for the 2006 season.

Dabengwa signed for Scottish team Ferguslie for the 2013 season. After a successful season helping them win the CricHQ40 cup he returned in the summer of 2014. This season was personally more successful for Dabengwa as he scored over 700 league runs including a high score of 184 vs Greenock. He also helped Ferguslie win the WDCU CSL First Division title.
