= Blessing Mahwire =

Zimbabwean cricketer (born 1982)

Personal information
- Full name: Ngonidzashe Blessing Mahwire
- Born: 31 July 1982 (age 44); Bikita, Masvingo, Zimbabwe
- Batting: Right-handed
- Bowling: Right-arm medium

International information
- National side: Zimbabwe
- Test debut: 9 November 2002 v Pakistan
- Last Test: 20 September 2005 v India
- ODI debut: 29 January 2004 v Australia
- Last ODI: 3 December 2006 v Bangladesh

Career statistics
Competition	Test	ODI	FC	LA
Matches	10	23	77	81
Runs scored	147	117	1,800	627
Batting average	13.36	10.63	17.14	15.67
100s/50s	0/1	0/0	1/4	0/3
Top score	50*	22*	115	85
Balls bowled	1,287	885	11,035	3,314
Wickets	18	21	199	83
Bowling average	50.83	36.90	30.24	32.44
5 wickets in innings	0	0	5	0
10 wickets in match	0	0	0	0
Best bowling	4/92	3/29	7/64	4/23
Catches/stumpings	1/–	6/–	29/–	15/–
- Source: ESPNcricinfo, 10 June 2015

Ngonidzashe Blessing Mahwire (born 31 July 1982) is a Zimbabwean cricketer who plays first-class cricket for Mashonaland and has also made appearances for the Zimbabwean cricket team in both the Test match and One Day International forms of the game. He is a right-handed batsman and medium-pace bowler.

His introduction to the game came as somewhat of a relief not only because he is a competent all-round cricketer, but also because he comes from a province in Zimbabwe called Masvingo, in which few cricketing roots can be found.

His highest score at school was 154 in Harare. He considers himself to be a "batsman who bowls", and is mainly used as a frontline bowler.
