= Tatenda Taibu =

Zimbabwean cricketer

Personal information
- Full name: Tatenda Taibu
- Born: 14 May 1983 (age 43); Harare, Zimbabwe
- Nickname: Tibbly
- Height: 5 ft 5 in (165 cm)
- Batting: Right-handed
- Bowling: Right-arm medium
- Role: Wicket-keeper
- Relatives: Kudzai Taibu (brother)

International information
- National side: Zimbabwe (2001–2012)
- Test debut (cap 52): 19 July 2001 v West Indies
- Last Test: 26 January 2012 v New Zealand
- ODI debut (cap 64): 23 June 2001 v West Indies
- Last ODI: 9 February 2012 v New Zealand
- ODI shirt no.: 44
- T20I debut (cap 14): 12 September 2007 v Australia
- Last T20I: 14 February 2012 v New Zealand

Domestic team information
- Years: Team
- 2000/01–2004/05: Mashonaland
- 2006/07: Namibia
- 2007/08–2008/09: Northerns
- 2008: Kolkata Knight Riders
- 2009/10: Mountaineers
- 2010/11–2011/12: Southern Rocks
- 2018/19: Badureliya Sports Club

Career statistics
Competition	Test	ODI	FC	LA
Matches	28	150	119	231
Runs scored	1,546	3,393	7,015	5,426
Batting average	30.31	29.25	37.71	30.82
100s/50s	1/12	2/22	12/50	5/35
Top score	153	107*	175*	121*
Balls bowled	48	84	972	569
Wickets	1	2	25	14
Bowling average	27.00	30.50	18.20	30.71
5 wickets in innings	0	0	1	0
10 wickets in match	0	0	0	0
Best bowling	1/27	2/42	8/43	4/25
Catches/stumpings	57/5	114/33	311/31	196/55
- Source: ESPNcricinfo, 14 September 2017

Tatenda Taibu (born 14 May 1983) is a Zimbabwean former cricketer who captained the Zimbabwe national cricket team. He is a wicket-keeper-batsman. From 6 May 2004 to 5 September 2019, he held the record for being the youngest test captain in history when he captained his team against Sri Lanka until Rashid Khan of Afghanistan claimed the record. Taibu is currently serving as Head Coach for Cricket PNG and its national men's team, known as the PNG Barramundis.

In July 2012 Taibu, aged only 29, decided to retire from cricket to focus on his work in church. In December 2018, it was reported that he was making a return to cricket. Later the same month, he played first-class cricket for Badureliya Sports Club in the 2018–19 Premier League Tournament in Sri Lanka.

== International career ==
Taibu made his first-class debut at the age of 16, and his debut for Zimbabwe national team in 2001, aged 18. In 2003, he was appointed vice-captain to Heath Streak on the team's tour of England, and was made national captain in April 2004, making him the youngest Test captain in history then, until Rashid Khan of Afghanistan claimed the record in 2019. Rashid Khan was 8 days younger than Taibu when he captained Afghanistan against Bangladesh.

He took a two-year break for Zimbabwe in from 2005 to 2007 when he played a season as the captain of Namibia and another season for the Cape Cobras in South Africa.

He made his return to the Zimbabwean side in a series against India A in July 2007, registering a century. The following month Zimbabwe hosted South Africa for a three-game ODI series and in the final game Taibu scored a career best 107 not out. It was the first ODI century by a Zimbabwean against South Africa.

During 2010 Taibu's form continued and he scored 73 against South Africa as Zimbabwe were all out for 268. The South Africans chased down the total comfortably with Hashim Amla and AB de Villiers scoring centuries.

He scored 98 for his side in 2011 World Cup as their team won by 175 runs against Canada in Nagpur. Taibu played an important innings in must-win situation of World Cup.

When Zimbabwe returned to Test cricket in 2011, Taibu was selected to play in their one-off Tests against Bangladesh, Pakistan and New Zealand despite making critical remarks of the country's cricket administration. He scored half-centuries in each of the three Tests.

Taibu became the 5th Zimbabwean to score 3,000 runs during his innings of 53 (74) against Kenya at Eden Gardens, Kolkata during the 2011 World Cup on 20 March 2011. He along with Stuart Matsikenyeri set the record partnership in ODIs for the sixth wicket for Zimbabwe(188)

== Retirement ==
On 10 July 2012, Taibu called time on his career aged 29. He said he would only do work for the church. Taibu told Zimeye: “I just feel that my true calling now lies in doing the Lord’s work, and although I am fortunate and proud to have played for my country, the time has come for me to put my entire focus on that part of my life.”

He scored 1,546 runs in Tests with 57 catches and five stumpings, while making 3,393 runs in ODIs with 114 catches and 33 stumpings. He finishes as Zimbabwe's fourth highest run-scorer in ODIs with the second most dismissals as a wicketkeeper, behind Andy Flower.

== Beyond cricket ==
After his retirement Taibu moved to Liverpool, England. He joined Hightown St. Mary's Cricket Club in 2016 as a player-coach-development-officer in the second-division of the Liverpool & District Cricket Competition. While writing his autobiography he realised that he would have to return to Zimbabwe. In June 2016 he accepted a role as Zimbabwe Cricket's convener of selectors and development officer, with the encouragement of Peter Chingoka. Brendan Taylor and Kyle Jarvis left county deals in September 2017 to play again for Zimbabwe, fruit of Taibu's efforts to entice them back.

In 2019, Taibu wrote a book titled 'Keeper of Faith', in which he discusses socio-political situation in Zimbabwe, his childhood beatings, perception after witnessing privileged white cricketers and threats by receiving photos of dead bodies.

Preceded by Heath Streak	Zimbabwean Test captain 2003/04–2005	Succeeded by Terrence Duffin
Preceded by Louis Burger	Namibia List A captain 2006	Succeeded by Louis Burger
