= Andy Blignaut =

Zimbabwean cricketer (born 1978)

Personal information
- Full name: Arnoldus Mauritius Blignaut
- Born: 1 August 1978 (age 48); Salisbury, Rhodesia
- Batting: Left-handed
- Bowling: Right-arm medium-fast
- Role: All-rounder

International information
- National side: Zimbabwe (1999–2010)
- Test debut (cap 48): 19 April 2001 v Bangladesh
- Last Test: 20 September 2005 v India
- ODI debut (cap 56): 2 September 1999 v West Indies
- Last ODI: 3 June 2010 v India
- ODI shirt no.: 99
- Only T20I (cap 25): 4 May 2010 v New Zealand

Career statistics
Competition	Test	ODI	FC	LA
Matches	19	54	57	80
Runs scored	886	626	2,375	915
Batting average	26.84	18.96	27.61	17.59
100s/50s	0/6	0/5	2/15	0/6
Top score	92	63*	194	63*
Balls bowled	3,173	2,348	8,112	3,341
Wickets	53	50	133	70
Bowling average	37.05	41.26	36.55	42.47
5 wickets in innings	3	0	3	0
10 wickets in match	0	0	0	0
Best bowling	5/73	4/43	5/73	4/43
Catches/stumpings	13/–	11/–	40/–	17/–
- Source: ESPNcricinfo, 2 September 2017

Arnoldus Mauritius Blignaut (born 1 August 1978) is a Zimbabwean former cricketer, who played all formats of the game. He was a right-arm fast-medium bowler, also known as a hard-hitting batsman in ODIs, where he frequently scored a fast rate; though he was seldom able to sustain this form and keeping his wicket intact through many overs. He more often played ODIs, where many runs in a short time are desired, than Tests.

== International career ==
On his Test debut, he took five wickets in the first innings against Bangladesh in Bulawayo in 2001. Blignaut took a hat-trick against Bangladesh in a Test match at Harare on 22 February 2004. He is the only bowler to take a Test hat-trick for Zimbabwe.

Like Travis Friend and Henry Olonga before him, Blignaut was one of the few Zimbabwean bowlers who could exceed 90 mph. In a land full of medium-fast bowlers, Blignaut (on his day) formed a lethal opening combination with the dependable Heath Streak, often rushing the batsmen for pace off the wicket. In an ODI against England at Durham in 2003, he bowled a 93 mph thunderbolt to England allrounder Andrew Flintoff. In the same game, however, he went at 10 runs an over, getting neither his line nor his length right. He remained Zimbabwe's wild card, especially in the shorter formats, with the ability to either win or lose a game in a matter of overs.

After playing the series against New Zealand and India in 2005, he withdrew from Zimbabwe selection over not being paid.

His ODI strike-rate is over 100, with a high score of 63 not out, and an average of just 19. His bowling average is just above 41, with best bowling figures of 4/43, and an economy of 5.34. He was also a fine fielder.

He made a brief comeback after his initial retirement and made his T20I debut for Zimbabwe in the 2010 T20 World Cup, which was his final international appearance.

== Domestic career ==
In the Australian season 2004–05, Blignaut was contracted to play for Tasmania. Injury and poor form prevented him from playing all but a couple of games for the state. He even struggled to make an impact at club level. Eventually he returned to Zimbabwe to re-join the Test team. The second year of his contract with Tasmania was cancelled.

He signed a contract with South African domestic team Highveld Lions for 2006 season. After 2006, he disappeared from cricket for a few years before returning in 2010 for a few matches for Zimbabwe.

== After cricket ==
His twin sons Kian and Michael are also cricketers. He works in the family business in Zimbabwe, and has been coaching cricket in the country.
