= List of Bangladesh One Day International cricket records =

One Day International (ODI) cricket records from Bangladesh

One Day International (ODI) cricket is played between international cricket teams who are full members of the International Cricket Council (ICC) as well as the top four associate members. Unlike Test matches, ODIs consist of one inning per team, having a limit in the number of overs, currently 50 overs per innings – although in the past this has been 55 or 60 overs. ODI cricket is List-A cricket, so statistics and records set in ODI matches also count toward List-A records. The earliest match recognized as an ODI was played between England and Australia in January 1971; since when there have been over 4,000 ODIs played by 28 teams. This is a list of Bangladeshi Cricket team's One Day International records. It is based on the List of One Day International cricket records, but concentrates solely on records dealing with the Bangladeshi cricket team. Bangladesh played its first-ever ODI in 1986.

== Key ==
The top five records are listed for each category, except for the team wins, losses, draws and ties, all round records and the partnership records. Tied records for fifth place are also included. Explanations of the general symbols and cricketing terms used in the list are given below. Specific details are provided in each category where appropriate. All records include matches played for Bangladesh only, and are correct as of March 2026.

Key
| Symbol | Meaning |
|---|---|
| † | Player or umpire is currently active in ODI cricket |
| ‡ | Even took place during a Cricket World Cup |
| * | Player remained not out or partnership remained unbroken |
| ♠ | One Day International cricket record |
| Date | Starting date of the match |
| Innings | Number of innings played |
| Matches | Number of matches played |
| Opposition | The team Bangladesh was playing against |
| Period | The time period when the player was active in ODI cricket |
| Player | The player involved in the record |
| Venue | One Day International cricket ground where the match was played |

== Team records ==
=== Overall record ===
| Matches | Won | Lost | Tied | NR | Win % |
|---|---|---|---|---|---|
| 461 | 167 | 283 | 1 | 10 | 36.15 |
Last Updated: 24 March 2026

=== Team wins, losses, draws and ties ===
As of June 2026, Bangladesh has played 461 ODI matches resulting in 167 victories, 283 defeats and 10 no results for an overall winning percentage of 36.15

| Opponent | Matches | Won | Lost | Tied | No result | % won | First | Last |
|---|---|---|---|---|---|---|---|---|
Full members
| Afghanistan | 22 | 11 | 11 | 0 | 0 | 50.00 | 2014 | 2025 |
| Australia | 25 | 3 | 21 | 0 | 1 | 12.00 | 1990 | 2026 |
| England | 25 | 5 | 20 | 0 | 0 | 20.00 | 2000 | 2023 |
| India | 42 | 8 | 33 | 0 | 1 | 19.04 | 1988 | 2025 |
| Ireland | 16 | 11 | 2 | 0 | 3 | 68.75 | 2007 | 2023 |
| New Zealand | 46 | 11 | 34 | 0 | 1 | 23.91 | 1990 | 2025 |
| Pakistan | 43 | 7 | 35 | 0 | 0 | 16.28 | 1986 | 2026 |
| South Africa | 25 | 6 | 19 | 0 | 0 | 24.00 | 2002 | 2023 |
| Sri Lanka | 60 | 13 | 45 | 0 | 2 | 22.41 | 1986 | 2025 |
| West Indies | 50 | 23 | 24 | 1 | 2 | 47.91 | 1999 | 2025 |
| Zimbabwe | 81 | 51 | 30 | 0 | 0 | 62.96 | 1997 | 2022 |
Associate members
| Bermuda | 2 | 2 | 0 | 0 | 0 | 100.00 | 2007 | 2007 |
| Canada | 2 | 1 | 1 | 0 | 0 | 50.00 | 2003 | 2007 |
| Hong Kong | 1 | 1 | 0 | 0 | 0 | 100.00 | 2004 | 2004 |
| Kenya | 14 | 8 | 6 | 0 | 0 | 57.14 | 1997 | 2006 |
| Netherlands | 3 | 1 | 2 | 0 | 0 | 33.33 | 2010 | 2023 |
| Scotland | 4 | 4 | 0 | 0 | 0 | 100.00 | 1999 | 2015 |
| United Arab Emirates | 1 | 1 | 0 | 0 | 0 | 100.00 | 2008 | 2008 |
| Total | 461 | 167 | 283 | 1 | 10 | 36.15 | 1986 | 2026 |
Statistics are correct as of Bangladesh vsPakistan at Sher-e-Bangla National Cricket Stadium, Mirpur, 15 March 2026

=== First bilateral ODI series wins ===
| Opponent | Home – year [win margin (no. of matches)] | Away – year [win margin (no. of matches)] |
|---|---|---|
Full members
| Afghanistan | 2016 [2–1 (3)] | YTP |
| Australia | 2026 [ 2–0 (Note: Series in progress, though Bangladesh have an unassailable lead) (3)] | – |
| England | – | – |
| India | 2015 [2–1 (3)] | YTP |
| Ireland | 2008 [3–0 (3)] | 2023 [2–0 (3)] |
| New Zealand | 2010 [4–0 (5)] | – |
| Pakistan | 2015 [3–0 (3)] | – |
| South Africa | 2015 [2–1 (3)] | 2022 [2–1 (3)] |
| Sri Lanka | 2021 [2–1 (3)] | – |
| West Indies | 2012 [3–2 (5)] | 2009 [3–0 (3)] |
| Zimbabwe | 2005 [3–2 (5)] | 2007 [3–1 (4)] |
Associate members
| Kenya | 2006 [4–0 (4)] | 2006 [3–0 (3)] |
| Netherlands | YTP | – |
| Scotland | 2006 [2–0 (2)] | – |
Last updated: 11 June 2026

=== First ODI match wins ===
| Opponent | Home | | Away / neutral | |
| Opponent | Venue | Year | Venue | Year |
|---|---|---|---|---|
Full members
| Afghanistan | Mirpur | 2016 | Canberra | 2015 ‡ |
| Australia | Mirpur | 2026 | Cardiff | 2005 |
| England | Chittagong | 2011 ‡ | Bristol | 2010 |
| India | Dhaka | 2004 | Port of Spain | 2007 ‡ |
| Ireland | Mirpur | 2008 | Belfast | 2010 |
| New Zealand | Mirpur | 2008 | Dublin | 2017 |
| Pakistan | Mirpur | 2015 | Northampton | 1999 ‡ |
| South Africa | Mirpur | 2015 | Providence | 2007 ‡ |
| Sri Lanka | Bogra | 2006 | Pallekele | 2013 |
| West Indies | Chittagong | 2011 | Roseau | 2009 |
| Zimbabwe | Chittagong | 2005 | Harare | 2004 |
Associate members
| Bermuda | YTP | YTP | St John's | 2007 |
| Canada | YTP | YTP | St John's | 2007 |
| Hong Kong | YTP | YTP | Colombo (SSC) | 2004 |
| Kenya | Bogra | 2006 | Hyderabad | 1998 |
| Netherlands | Chittagong | 2011 ‡ | – | – |
| Scotland | Chittagong | 2006 | Edinburg | 1999 ‡ |
| United Arab Emirates | YTP | YTP | Lahore | 2008 |
Last updated: 14 November 2024

=== Winning every match in a series ===
In a bilateral series winning all matches is referred to as whitewash. First such event occurred when West Indies toured England in 1976. Bangladesh have recorded 14 such series victories.

| Opposition | Matches | Host | Season |
|---|---|---|---|
| Kenya | 4 | Bangladesh | 2005/06 |
| Kenya | 3 | Kenya | 2006 |
| Zimbabwe | 5 | Bangladesh | 2006/07 |
| Ireland | 3 | Bangladesh | 2007/08 |
| West Indies | 3 | West Indies | 2009 |
| New Zealand | 4 | Bangladesh | 2010/11 |
| New Zealand | 3 | Bangladesh | 2013/14 |
| Zimbabwe | 5 | Bangladesh | 2014/15 |
| Pakistan | 3 | Bangladesh | 2014 |
| Zimbabwe | 3 | Bangladesh | 2015/16 |
| Zimbabwe | 3 | Bangladesh | 2018/19 |
| Zimbabwe | 3 | Bangladesh | 2019/20 |
| West Indies | 3 | Bangladesh | 2020/21 |
| Zimbabwe | 3 | Zimbabwe | 2021 |
| West Indies | 3 | West Indies | 2022 |
Last updated: 14 November 2024

=== Losing every match in a series ===
Bangladesh have also suffered such whitewash 29 times.

| Opposition | Matches | Host | Season |
|---|---|---|---|
| Zimbabwe | 3 | Zimbabwe | 2000/01 |
| Zimbabwe | 3 | Bangladesh | 2001/02 |
| Pakistan | 3 | Bangladesh | 2001/02 |
| Sri Lanka | 3 | Sri Lanka | 2002 |
| South Africa | 3 | South Africa | 2002/03 |
| Australia | 3 | Australia | 2003 |
| Pakistan | 5 | Pakistan | 2003 |
| England | 3 | Bangladesh | 2003/04 |
| West Indies | 3 | West Indies | 2004 |
| New Zealand | 3 | Bangladesh | 2004/05 |
| Sri Lanka | 3 | Sri Lanka | 2005 |
| Australia | 3 | Bangladesh | 2005/06 |
| Sri Lanka | 3 | Sri Lanka | 2007 |
| New Zealand | 3 | New Zealand | 2007/08 |
| South Africa | 3 | Bangladesh | 2007/08 |
| Pakistan | 5 | Pakistan | 2007/08 |
| Australia | 3 | Australia | 2008 |
| New Zealand | 3 | New Zealand | 2009/10 |
| England | 3 | Bangladesh | 2009/10 |
| Australia | 3 | Bangladesh | 2011 |
| Pakistan | 3 | Bangladesh | 2011/12 |
| Sri Lanka | 3 | Bangladesh | 2013/14 |
| West Indies | 3 | West Indies | 2014 |
| New Zealand | 3 | New Zealand | 2016/17 |
| South Africa | 3 | South Africa | 2017/18 |
| New Zealand | 3 | New Zealand | 2018/19 |
| Sri Lanka | 3 | Sri Lanka | 2019 |
| New Zealand | 3 | New Zealand | 2020/21 |
| West Indies | 3 | West Indies | 2024/25 |
| Afghanistan | 3 | United Arab Emirates | 2025/26 |
Last updated: 13 March 2026

=== Team scoring records ===
==== Highest runs in an innings ====
The highest innings total scored in ODIs came in the match played between England and the Netherlands in June, 2022. Playing in the first ODI at VRA Cricket Ground in Amstelveen, the visiting team posted a total of 498/4. The game against Ireland in March, 2023 saw Bangladesh set their highest innings total of 338/8. Bangladesh broke that record as well by scoring 349/6 in the very next ODI match against Ireland on 20 March 2023 at the Sylhet International Cricket Stadium.

| Rank | Score | Opposition | Venue | Date | Scorecard |
|---|---|---|---|---|---|
| 1 | 349/6 | Ireland | Sylhet International Cricket Stadium, Sylhet, Bangladesh | 20 March 2023 | Scorecard |
| 2 | 338/8 | Ireland | Sylhet International Cricket Stadium, Sylhet, Bangladesh | 18 March 2023 | Scorecard |
| 3 | 334/5 | Afghanistan | Gaddafi Stadium, Lahore, Pakistan | 3 September 2023 | Scorecard |
| 4 | 333/8 | Australia | Trent Bridge, Nottingham, England | 20 June 2019 ‡ | Scorecard |
| 5 | 330/6 | South Africa | The Oval, London, England | 2 June 2019 ‡ | Scorecard |
| Last updated: 14 November 2024 | | | | | |

==== Fewest runs in an innings ====
The lowest innings total scored in ODIs has been scored twice. Zimbabwe were dismissed for 35 by Sri Lanka during the third ODI in Sri Lanka's tour of Zimbabwe in April 2004 and USA were dismissed for same score by Nepal in the sixth ODI of the 2020 ICC Cricket World League 2 in Nepal in February 2020. The lowest score in ODI history for Bangladesh is 58 scored twice, once against West Indies in the 2011 Cricket World Cup and against India in June 2014.

| Rank | Score | Opposition | Venue | Date | Scorecard |
|---|---|---|---|---|---|
| 1 | 58 | West Indies | Sher-e-Bangla National Cricket Stadium, Mirpur, Bangladesh | 4 March 2011 ‡ | Scorecard |
| 1 | 58 | India | Sher-e-Bangla National Cricket Stadium, Mirpur, Bangladesh | 17 June 2014 | Scorecard |
| 3 | 70 | West Indies | National Cricket Stadium, St. George's, Grenada | 22 August 2014 | Scorecard |
| 4 | 74 | Australia | Marrara Oval, Darwin, Australia | 30 August 2008 | Scorecard |
| 5 | 76 | Sri Lanka | Sinhalese Sports Club Ground, Colombo, Sri Lanka | 5 August 2002 | Scorecard |
| 5 | 76 | India | National Stadium, Dhaka, Bangladesh | 11 April 2003 | Scorecard |
Last updated: 14 November 2024

==== Most runs conceded an innings ====
Bangladesh conceded that the most runs against India in 2022 in the third ODI is 409 runs.

| Rank | Score | Opposition | Venue | Date | Scorecard |
|---|---|---|---|---|---|
| 1 | 409/8 | India | Bir Shrestho Flight Lieutenant Matiur Rahman Cricket Stadium, Chattogram, Bangladesh | 10 December 2022 | Scorecard |
| 2 | 391/4 | England | Trent Bridge, Nottingham, England | 21 June 2005 | Scorecard |
| 3 | 386/6 | England | SWALEC Stadium, Cardiff, England | 8 June 2019 ‡ | Scorecard |
| 4 | 385/7 | Pakistan | Rangiri Dambulla International Stadium, Dambulla, Sri Lanka | 21 June 2010 | Scorecard |
| 5 | 382/5 | South Africa | Wankhede Stadium, Mumbai, India | 24 October 2023 ‡ | Scorecard |
Last updated: 14 November 2024

==== Fewest runs conceded in an innings ====
The lowest score conceded by Bangladesh for a full inning is 44 scored by Zimbabwe in the fourth ODI of the 2009 series.

| Rank | Score | Opposition | Venue | Date | Scorecard |
|---|---|---|---|---|---|
| 1 | 44 | Zimbabwe | Bir Shrestho Flight Lieutenant Matiur Rahman Cricket Stadium, Chittagong, Bangladesh | 3 November 2009 | Scorecard |
| 2 | 61 | West Indies | Bir Shrestho Flight Lieutenant Matiur Rahman Cricket Stadium, Chittagong, Bangladesh | 18 October 2011 | Scorecard |
| 3 | 98 | New Zealand | McLean Park, Napier, New Zealand | 23 December 2023 | Scorecard |
| 4 | 101 | Ireland | Sylhet International Cricket Stadium, Sylhet, Bangladesh | 23 March 2023 | Scorecard |
| 5 | 105 | India | Sher-e-Bangla National Cricket Stadium, Mirpur, Bangladesh | 17 June 2014 | Scorecard |
| 5 | 105 | Hong Kong | Sinhalese Sports Club Ground, Colombo, Sri Lanka | 16 July 2004 | Scorecard |
Last updated: 14 November 2024

==== Most runs aggregate in a match ====
The highest match aggregate scored in ODIs came in the match between South Africa and Australia in the fifth ODI of March 2006 series at Wanderers Stadium, Johannesburg when South Africa scored 438/9 in response to Australia's 434/4. The 2019 Cricket World Cup game against Australia in Trent Bridge, Nottingham saw a total of 714 runs being scored.

| Rank | Aggregate | Scores | Venue | Date | Scorecard |
|---|---|---|---|---|---|
| 1 | 714/13 | Australia (381/5) v Bangladesh (333/8) | Trent Bridge, Nottingham, England | 20 June 2019 ‡ | Scorecard |
| 2 | 666/16 | England (386/6) v Bangladesh (280) | SWALEC Stadium, Cardiff, England | 8 June 2019 ‡ | Scorecard |
| 3 | 656/14 | Australia (361/8) v Bangladesh (295/6) | Sher-e-Bangla National Cricket Stadium, Mirpur, Bangladesh | 13 April 2011 | Scorecard |
| 4 | 655/10 | Bangladesh (326/3) v Pakistan (329/7) | Sher-e-Bangla National Cricket Stadium, Mirpur, Bangladesh | 4 March 2014 | Scorecard |
| 5 | 653/13 | India (370/4) v Bangladesh (283/9) | Sher-e-Bangla National Cricket Stadium, Mirpur, Bangladesh | 19 February 2011 ‡ | Scorecard |
Last updated: 14 November 2024

==== Fewest runs aggregate in a match ====
The lowest match aggregate in ODIs is 71 when USA were dismissed for 35 by Nepal in the sixth ODI of the 2020 ICC Cricket World League 2 in Nepal in February 2020. The lowest match aggregate in ODI history for Bangladesh is 127 scored ninth match of the 1980–81 Australia Tri-Nation Series against Australia, which is the joint 11th lowest of all time.

| Rank | Aggregate | Scores | Venue | Date | Scorecard |
|---|---|---|---|---|---|
| 1 | 93/14 | Zimbabwe (44) v Bangladesh (49/4) | Bir Shrestho Flight Lieutenant Matiur Rahman Cricket Stadium, Chittagong, Bangladesh | 3 November 2009 | Scorecard |
| 2 | 117/11 | Bangladesh (58) v West Indies (59/1) | Sher-e-Bangla National Cricket Stadium, Mirpur, Bangladesh | 4 March 2011 ‡ | Scorecard |
| 3 | 123/12 | West Indies (61) v Bangladesh (62/2) | Bir Shrestho Flight Lieutenant Matiur Rahman Cricket Stadium, Chittagong, Bangladesh | 18 October 2011 | Scorecard |
| 4 | 153/12 | Bangladesh (76) v Sri Lanka (77/2) | Sinhalese Sports Club Ground, Colombo, Sri Lanka | 5 August 2002 | Scorecard |
| 5 | 163/20 | India (105) v Bangladesh (58) | Sher-e-Bangla National Cricket Stadium, Mirpur, Bangladesh | 17 June 2014 | Scorecard |
Last updated: 14 November 2024

=== Result records ===
An ODI match is won when one side has scored more runs than the total runs scored by the opposing side during their innings. If both sides have completed both their allocated innings and the side that fielded last has the higher aggregate of runs, it is known as a win by runs. This indicates the number of runs that they had scored more than the opposing side. If the side batting last wins the match, it is known as a win by wickets, indicating the number of wickets that were still to fall.

==== Greatest win margins (by runs) ====
The greatest winning margin by runs in ODIs was England's victory over South Africa by 342 runs in the third and final ODI of South Africa's 2025 tour of England. The largest victory recorded by Bangladesh was over Ireland by 183 runs.

| Rank | Margin | Target | Opposition | Venue | Date |
|---|---|---|---|---|---|
| 1 | 183 runs | 339 | Ireland | Sylhet International Cricket Stadium, Sylhet, Bangladesh | 18 March 2023 |
| 2 | 169 runs | 322 | Zimbabwe | Sylhet International Cricket Stadium, Sylhet, Bangladesh | 1 March 2020 |
| 3 | 163 runs | 321 | Sri Lanka | Sher-e-Bangla National Cricket Stadium, Mirpur, Bangladesh | 19 January 2018 |
| 4 | 160 runs | 293 | West Indies | Sheikh Abu Naser Stadium, Khulna, Bangladesh | 2 December 2012 |
| 5 | 155 runs | 277 | Zimbabwe | Harare Sports Club, Harare, Zimbabwe | 16 July 2021 |
Last updated: 14 November 2024

==== Greatest win margins (by balls remaining) ====
The greatest winning margin by balls remaining in ODIs was England's victory over Canada by 8 wickets with 277 balls remaining in the 1979 Cricket World Cup. The largest victory recorded by Bangladesh is during the Zimbabwe's tour in 2009 when they won by 6 wickets with 229 balls remaining.

| Rank | Balls remaining | Margin | Opposition | Venue | Date |
|---|---|---|---|---|---|
| 1 | 229 | 6 wickets | Zimbabwe | Bir Shrestho Flight Lieutenant Matiur Rahman Cricket Stadium, Chittagong, Bangladesh | 3 November 2009 |
| 2 | 221 | 10 wickets | Ireland | Sylhet International Cricket Stadium, Sylhet, Bangladesh | 23 March 2023 |
| 3 | 209 | 9 wickets | New Zealand | McLean Park, Napier, New Zealand | 23 December 2023 |
| 4 | 209 | 8 wickets | Pakistan | Sher-e-Bangla National Cricket Stadium, Dhaka, Bangladesh | 13 March 2026 |
| 5 | 180 | 8 wickets | West Indies | Bir Shrestho Flight Lieutenant Matiur Rahman Cricket Stadium, Chittagong, Bangladesh | 18 October 2011 |
Last updated: 13 March 2026

==== Greatest win margins (by wickets) ====
A total of 55 matches have ended with chasing team winning by 10 wickets with West Indies winning by such margins a record 10 times. Bangladesh have won ODI match by this margin 1 time.

| Rank | Margin | Opposition | Most recent venue | Date |
|---|---|---|---|---|
| 1 | 10 wickets | Ireland | Sylhet International Cricket Stadium | 23 March 2023 |
| 2 | 9 wickets | Kenya | Sheikh Abu Naser Stadium, Khulna, Bangladesh | 20 March 2006 |
| 2 | 9 wickets | Zimbabwe | Sheikh Abu Naser Stadium, Khulna, Bangladesh | 30 November 2006 |
| 2 | 9 wickets | South Africa | Bir Shrestho Flight Lieutenant Matiur Rahman Cricket Stadium, Chittagong, Bangladesh | 15 July 2015 |
| 2 | 9 wickets | South Africa | SuperSport Park, Centurion, South Africa | 24 March 2022 |
| 2 | 9 wickets | West Indies | Providence Stadium, Guyana | 14 July 2022 |
| 2 | 9 wickets | New Zealand | McLean Park, Napier, New Zealand | 23 December 2023 |
Last updated: 14 November 2024

==== Highest successful run chases ====
South Africa holds the record for the highest successful run chase which they achieved when they scored 438/9 in response to Australia's 434/9. Bangladesh's highest innings total while chasing is 322/3 in a successful run chase against West Indies at Taunton, England during the 2019 Cricket World Cup.

| Rank | Score | Target | Opposition | Venue | Date |
|---|---|---|---|---|---|
| 1 | 322/3 | 322 | West Indies | The Cooper Associates County Ground, Taunton, England | 17 June 2019 ‡ |
| 2 | 320/7 | 320 | Ireland | County Ground, Chelmsford, England | 12 May 2023 |
| 3 | 322/4 | 319 | Scotland | Saxton Oval, Nelson, New Zealand | 5 March 2015 ‡ |
| 4 | 313/6 | 313 | Zimbabwe | Queens Sports Club, Bulawayo, Zimbabwe | 16 August 2009 |
| 5 | 309/6 | 308 | New Zealand | Fatullah Osmani Stadium, Fatullah, Bangladesh | 3 November 2013 |
Last updated: 14 November 2024

==== Narrowest win margins (by runs) ====
The narrowest run margin victory is by 1 run which has been achieved in 31 ODI's with Australia winning such games a record 6 times. Bangladesh's has not achieved any victory by 1 run.

| Rank | Margin | Opposition | Venue | Date |
|---|---|---|---|---|
| 1 | 3 runs | New Zealand | Sher-e-Bangla National Cricket Stadium, Mirpur, Bangladesh | 17 October 2010 |
| 1 | 3 runs | Afghanistan | Sheikh Zayed Cricket Stadium, Abu Dhabi, United Arab Emirates | 23 September 2018 |
| 3 | 4 runs | Zimbabwe | Sylhet International Cricket Stadium, Sylhet, Bangladesh | 3 March 2020 |
| 4 | 5 runs | England | Bristol County Ground, Bristol, England | 10 July 2010 |
| 4 | 5 runs | India | Sher-e-Bangla National Cricket Stadium, Mirpur, Bangladesh | 7 December 2022 |
Last updated: 14 November 2024

==== Narrowest win margins (by balls remaining) ====
The narrowest winning margin by balls remaining in ODIs is by winning of the last ball which has been achieved 36 times with both South Africa winning seven times. Bangladesh has not yet achieved a victory by this margin.

| Rank | Balls remaining | Margin | Opposition | Venue | Date |
|---|---|---|---|---|---|
| 1 | 3 | 3 wickets | Ireland | County Ground, Chelmsford, England | 12 May 2023 |
| 2 | 4 | 5 wickets | Australia | SWALEC Stadium, Cardiff, England | 18 June 2005 |
| 2 | 4 | 5 wickets | India | Sher-e-Bangla National Cricket Stadium, Mirpur, Bangladesh | 16 March 2012 |
| 2 | 4 | 4 wickets | New Zealand | Fatullah Osmani Stadium, Fatullah, Bangladesh | 3 November 2013 |
| 5 | 5 | 3 wickets | Zimbabwe | Harare Sports Club, Harare, Zimbabwe | 18 July 2021 |
Last updated: 13 March 2026

==== Narrowest win margins (by wickets) ====
The narrowest margin of victory by wickets is 1 wicket which has settled 55 such ODIs. Both West Indies and New Zealand have recorded such victory on eight occasions. Bangladesh has won the match by a margin of one wicket on three occasions.

| Rank | Margin | Opposition | Venue | Date |
|---|---|---|---|---|
| 1 | 1 wicket | Zimbabwe | Harare Sports Club, Harare, Zimbabwe | 10 February 2007 |
| 1 | 1 wicket | Zimbabwe | Bir Shrestho Flight Lieutenant Matiur Rahman Cricket Stadium, Chittagong, Bangladesh | 5 November 2009 |
| 1 | 1 wicket | India | Sher-e-Bangla National Cricket Stadium, Mirpur, Bangladesh | 7 December 2022 |
| 4 | 2 wickets | Kenya | Gymkhana Club Ground, Nairobi, Kenya | 13 August 2006 |
| 4 | 2 wickets | England | Bir Shrestho Flight Lieutenant Matiur Rahman Cricket Stadium, Chittagong, Bangladesh | 11 March 2011 ‡ |
| 4 | 2 wickets | West Indies | Sher-e-Bangla National Cricket Stadium, Mirpur, Bangladesh | 8 December 2012 |
Last updated: 14 November 2024

==== Greatest loss margins (by runs) ====
Bangladesh's biggest defeat by runs was against Pakistan in the 2000 Asia Cup against Pakistan at National Stadium, Bangladesh.

| Rank | Margin | Opposition | Venue | Date |
|---|---|---|---|---|
| 1 | 233 runs | Pakistan | National Stadium, Dhaka, Bangladesh | 2 June 2000 |
| 2 | 227 runs | India | Bir Shrestho Flight Lieutenant Matiur Rahman Cricket Stadium, Chattogram, Bangladesh | 10 December 2022 |
| 3 | 206 runs | South Africa | Sher-e-Bangla National Cricket Stadium, Mirpur, Bangladesh | 19 March 2011 ‡ |
| 4 | 200 runs | India | National Stadium, Dhaka, Bangladesh | 11 April 2003 |
| 4 | 200 runs | South Africa | Buffalo Park, East London, South Africa | 22 October 2017 |
Last updated: 14 November 2024

==== Greatest loss margins (by balls remaining) ====
The greatest winning margin by balls remaining in ODIs was England's victory over Canada by 8 wickets with 277 balls remaining in the 1979 Cricket World Cup. The largest defeat suffered by Bangladesh was against New Zealand in New Zealand when they lost by 10 wickets with 264 balls remaining.

| Rank | Balls remaining | Margin | Opposition | Venue | Date |
|---|---|---|---|---|---|
| 1 | 264 | 10 wickets | New Zealand | Queenstown Events Centre, Queenstown, New Zealand | 31 December 2007 |
| 2 | 229 | 10 wickets | Sri Lanka | Sher-e-Bangla National Cricket Stadium, Mirpur, Bangladesh | 25 January 2018 |
| 3 | 228 | 10 wickets | South Africa | Goodyear Park, Bloemfontein, South Africa | 22 February 2003 ‡ |
| 4 | 226 | 9 wickets | West Indies | Sher-e-Bangla National Cricket Stadium, Mirpur, Bangladesh | 4 March 2011 ‡ |
| 5 | 206 | 8 wickets | Sri Lanka | Sinhalese Sports Club Ground, Colombo, Sri Lanka | 5 August 2002 |
Last updated: 14 November 2024

==== Greatest loss margins (by wickets) ====
Bangladesh have lost an ODI match by a margin of 10 wickets on 12 occasions with the most recent being during the sixth match of the Tri-Series in Bangladesh in January 2018.

| Rank | Margins | Opposition | Most recent venue | Date |
|---|---|---|---|---|
| 1 | 10 wickets | South Africa | Willowmoore Park, Benoni, South Africa | 6 October 2002 |
| 1 | 10 wickets | Sri Lanka | City Oval, Pietermaritzburg, South Africa | 14 February 2003 ‡ |
| 1 | 10 wickets | South Africa | Goodyear Park, Bloemfontein, South Africa | 22 February 2003 ‡ |
| 1 | 10 wickets | Sri Lanka | Ranasinghe Premadasa Stadium, Colombo, Sri Lanka | 23 July 2004 |
| 1 | 10 wickets | England | The Oval, London, England | 16 June 2005 |
| 1 | 10 wickets | Australia | Old Trafford, Manchester, England | 25 June 2005 |
| 1 | 10 wickets | West Indies | Sawai Mansingh Stadium, Jaipur, India | 11 October 2006 |
| 1 | 10 wickets | Australia | Sir Vivian Richards Stadium, Antigua, Antigua & Barbuda | 31 March 2007 ‡ |
| 1 | 10 wickets | New Zealand | Queenstown Events Centre, Queenstown, New Zealand | 31 December 2007 |
| 1 | 10 wickets | Pakistan | National Stadium, Karachi, Pakistan | 4 July 2008 |
| 1 | 10 wickets | South Africa | De Beers Diamond Oval, Kimberley, South Africa | 15 October 2017 |
| 1 | 10 wickets | Sri Lanka | Sher-e-Bangla National Cricket Stadium, Mirpur, Bangladesh | 25 January 2018 |
Last updated: 14 November 2024

==== Narrowest loss margins (by runs) ====
The narrowest loss of Bangladesh in terms of runs is by 2 runs suffered against Pakistan in the final of the 2012 Asia Cup.

| Rank | Margin | Opposition | Venue | Date |
|---|---|---|---|---|
| 1 | 2 runs | Pakistan | Sher-e-Bangla National Cricket Stadium, Mirpur, Bangladesh | 22 March 2012 |
| 2 | 3 runs | West Indies | Providence Stadium, Providence, West Indies | 25 July 2018 |
| 3 | 5 runs | Zimbabwe | Harare Sports Club, Harare, Zimbabwe | 16 August 2011 |
| 4 | 9 runs | Zimbabwe | Sher-e-Bangla National Cricket Stadium, Mirpur, Bangladesh | 1 December 2010 |
| 5 | 11 runs | India | MA Aziz Stadium, Chittagong, Bangladesh | 23 December 2004 |
Last updated: 14 November 2024

==== Narrowest loss margins (by balls remaining) ====
The narrowest winning margin by balls remaining in ODIs is by winning of the last ball which has been achieved 36 times with both South Africa winning seven times. Bangladesh has suffered loss by this margin two times, one being the 2018 Asia Cup Final.

| Rank | Balls remaining | Margin | Opposition | Venue | Date |
|---|---|---|---|---|---|
| 1 | 0 | 2 wickets | Zimbabwe | Harare Sports Club, Harare, Zimbabwe | 2 August 2006 |
| 1 | 0 | 3 wickets | India | Dubai International Cricket Stadium, Dubai, United Arab Emirates | 28 September 2018 |
| 3 | 1 | 5 wickets | Pakistan | Rawalpindi Cricket Stadium, Rawalpindi, Pakistan | 18 September 2003 |
| 3 | 1 | 3 wickets | Pakistan | Sher-e-Bangla National Cricket Stadium, Mirpur, Bangladesh | 4 March 2014 |
| 5 | 2 | 2 wickets | Afghanistan | Sher-e-Bangla National Cricket Stadium, Mirpur, Bangladesh | 28 September 2016 |
| 5 | 2 | 4 wickets | West Indies | Sher-e-Bangla National Cricket Stadium, Mirpur, Bangladesh | 11 December 2018 |
Last updated: 14 November 2024

==== Narrowest loss margins (by wickets) ====
Bangladesh has suffered defeat by 1 wicket only once.

| Rank | Margin | Opposition | Venue | Date |
|---|---|---|---|---|
| 1 | 1 wicket | West Indies | Arnos Vale Stadium, Kingstown, Saint Vincent & the Grenadines | 15 May 2004 |
| 2 | 2 wickets | Zimbabwe | Harare Sports Club, Harare, Zimbabwe | 29 July 2006 |
| 2 | 2 wickets | Zimbabwe | Harare Sports Club, Harare, Zimbabwe | 2 August 2006 |
| 2 | 2 wickets | Sri Lanka | Sher-e-Bangla National Cricket Stadium, Mirpur, Bangladesh | 16 January 2009 |
| 2 | 2 wickets | Zimbabwe | Sher-e-Bangla National Cricket Stadium, Mirpur, Bangladesh | 19 January 2009 |
| 2 | 2 wickets | England | Sher-e-Bangla National Cricket Stadium, Mirpur, Bangladesh | 2 March 2010 |
| 2 | 2 wickets | Afghanistan | Sher-e-Bangla National Cricket Stadium, Mirpur, Bangladesh | 28 September 2016 |
| 2 | 2 wickets | New Zealand | The Oval, London, England | 5 June 2019 ‡ |
Last updated: 14 November 2024

== Batting Records ==
=== Most career runs ===
A run is the basic means of scoring in cricket. A run is scored when the batsman hits the ball with his bat and with his partner runs the length of 22 yards (20 m) of the pitch. India's Sachin Tendulkar has scored the most runs in ODIs with 18,426. Second is Kumar Sangakkara of Sri Lanka with 14,234 ahead of Ricky Ponting from Australia in third with 13,704. Tamim Iqbal is the leading Bangladeshi on this list.

| Rank | Runs | Player | Matches | Innings | Average | 100 | 50 | Period |
|---|---|---|---|---|---|---|---|---|
| 1 | 8,357 | Tamim Iqbal | 243 | 240 | 36.65 | 14 | 56 | 2007–2023 |
| 2 | 7,795 | Mushfiqur Rahim | 274 | 256 | 36.42 | 9 | 49 | 2006–2025 |
| 3 | 7,570 | Shakib Al Hasan | 247 | 234 | 37.29 | 9 | 56 | 2006–2023 |
| 4 | 5,689 | Mahmudullah | 239 | 209 | 36.46 | 4 | 32 | 2007–2025 |
| 5 | 3,468 | Mohammad Ashraful | 175 | 168 | 22.37 | 3 | 20 | 2001–2013 |
| 6 | 2,572 | Litton Das† | 96 | 95 | 29.90 | 5 | 12 | 2015–2026 |
| 7 | 2,434 | Imrul Kayes | 78 | 78 | 32.02 | 4 | 16 | 2008–2018 |
| 8 | 2,338 | Soumya Sarkar† | 79 | 74 | 33.40 | 3 | 14 | 2014–2025 |
| 9 | 2,201 | Shahriar Nafees | 75 | 75 | 31.44 | 4 | 13 | 2005–2011 |
| 10 | 2,168 | Habibul Bashar | 111 | 105 | 21.68 | 0 | 14 | 1995–2007 |
Last updated: 13 March 2026

=== Fastest runs getter ===
| Runs | Batsman | Match | Innings | Record date | Ref |
|---|---|---|---|---|---|
| 1000 | Shahriar Nafees | 29 | 29 | 30 November 2006 | |
| 1000 | Anamul Haque | 32 | 29 | 19 January 2018 | |
| 2000 | Soumya Sarkar | 68 | 64 | 15 March 2024 ‡ | |
| 3000 | Tamim Iqbal | 102 | 102 | 19 August 2011 | |
| 4000 | Shakib Al Hasan | 142 | 136 | 18 February 2015 ‡ | |
| 5000 | Tamim Iqbal | 159 | 158 | 12 October 2016 | |
| 6000 | Tamim Iqbal | 177 | 175 | 23 January 2018 | |
| 7000 | Tamim Iqbal | 206 | 204 | 3 March 2020 | |
| 8000 | Tamim Iqbal | 229 | 227 | 5 August 2022 | |

=== Most runs in each batting position ===
| Batting position | Batsman | Innings | Runs | Average | Career span | Ref |
|---|---|---|---|---|---|---|
| Opener | Tamim Iqbal | 240 | 8,357 | 36.65 | 2007–2023 | |
| Number 3 | Shakib Al Hasan | 36 | 1,539 | 49.64 | 2014–2022 | |
| Number 4 | Mushfiqur Rahim | 118 | 4,372 | 42.03 | 2007–2023 | |
| Number 5 | Shakib Al Hasan | 132 | 4,077 | 35.14 | 2006–2023 | |
| Number 6 | Mahmudullah | 75 | 2,201 | 37.30 | 2008–2025 | |
| Number 7 | Mahmudullah | 73 | 1,663 | 34.64 | 2007–2023 | |
| Number 8 | Mehidy Hasan Miraz† | 34 | 662 | 24.51 | 2017–2023 | |
| Number 9 | Mashrafe Mortaza | 71 | 688 | 11.86 | 2001-2020 | |
| Number 10 | Abdur Razzak | 46 | 358 | 16.27 | 2004–2014 | |
| Number 11 | Mustafizur Rahman† | 36 | 87 | 6.69 | 2015–2025 | |
Last updated: 6 March 2025.

=== Most runs against each team ===
| Opposition | Runs | Batsman | Innings | Average | Career span | Ref |
|---|---|---|---|---|---|---|
| Afghanistan | 481 | Mehidy Hasan Miraz | 14 | 43.72 | 2018–2025 | |
| Australia | 343 | Tamim Iqbal | 9 | 38.11 | 2007–2019 | |
| Bermuda | 116 | Shahriar Nafees | 2 | 116.00 | 2007–2007 | |
| Canada | 134 | Shakib Al Hasan | 1 | 134.00 | 2007–2007 | |
| England | 626 | Mushfiqur Rahim | 16 | 41.73 | 2007–2023 | |
| Hong Kong | 68 | Javed Omar | 1 | 68.00 | 2004–2004 | |
| India | 751 | Shakib Al Hasan | 21 | 37.55 | 2007–2023 | |
| Ireland | 665 | Tamim Iqbal | 16 | 47.50 | 2007-2023 | |
| Kenya | 239 | Shahriar Nafees | 7 | 34.14 | 2006–2006 | |
| Netherlands | 125 | Imrul Kayes | 2 | 125.00 | 2010–2011 | |
| New Zealand | 794 | Mushfiqur Rahim | 33 | 26.46 | 2007–2025 | |
| Pakistan | 684 | Tamim Iqbal | 17 | 42.75 | 2008–2019 | |
| Scotland | 118 | Aftab Ahmed | 2 | 59.00 | 2006–2006 | |
| South Africa | 493 | Shakib Al Hasan | 17 | 32.86 | 2007–2023 | |
| Sri Lanka | 1,207 | Mushfiqur Rahim | 37 | 35.50 | 2007-2024 | |
| United Arab Emirates | 109 | Mohammad Ashraful | 1 | 109.00 | 2008–2008 | |
| West Indies | 1,208 | Tamim Iqbal | 32 | 43.14 | 2007–2022 | |
| Zimbabwe | 1,947 | Tamim Iqbal | 47 | 43.26 | 2007-2022 | |
Last updated: 6 March 2025

=== Highest individual score ===
The fourth ODI of the Sri Lanka's tour of India in 2014 saw Rohit Sharma score the highest Individual score. Liton Das holds the Bangladeshi record when he scored 176 against Zimbabwe in the third ODI of the 2020 series.

| Rank | Runs | Player | Opposition | Venue | Date |
|---|---|---|---|---|---|
| 1 | 176 | Litton Das | Zimbabwe | Sylhet International Cricket Stadium, Sylhet, Bangladesh | 6 March 2020 |
| 2 | 169 | Soumya Sarkar | New Zealand | Saxton Oval, Nelson, New Zealand | 20 December 2023 |
| 3 | 158 | Tamim Iqbal | Zimbabwe | Sylhet International Cricket Stadium, Sylhet, Bangladesh | 3 March 2020 |
| 4 | 154 | Tamim Iqbal | Zimbabwe | Queens Sports Club, Bulawayo, Zimbabwe | 16 August 2009 |
| 5 | 144 | Mushfiqur Rahim | Sri Lanka | Dubai International Cricket Stadium, Dubai, United Arab Emirates | 15 September 2018 |
| 5 | 144 | Imrul Kayes | Zimbabwe | Sher-e-Bangla National Cricket Stadium, Mirpur, Bangladesh | 21 October 2018 |
Last updated: 14 November 2024

=== Highest individual score – progression of record ===
| Runs | Player | Opponent | Venue | Season |
|---|---|---|---|---|
| 37 | Shaheedur Rahman | Pakistan | Tyronne Fernando Stadium, Moratuwa, Sri Lanka | 1985-86 |
| 40 | Minhajul Abedin | Sri Lanka | Asgiriya Stadium, Kandy, Sri Lanka | 1985-86 |
| 54 | Azhar Hossain | New Zealand | Sharjah Cricket Stadium, Sharjah, United Arab Emirates | 1990 |
| 57 | Faruk Ahmed | India | Sector 16 Stadium, Chandigarh, India | 1990-91 |
| 78* | Athar Ali Khan | Sri Lanka | Eden Gardens, Kolkata, India | 1990-91 |
| 82* | Athar Ali Khan | Sri Lanka | Ranasinghe Premadasa Stadium, Colombo, Sri Lanka | 1997 |
| 95 | Shahriar Hossain | Kenya | National Stadium, Dhaka, Bangladesh | 1998–99 |
| 101 | Mehrab Hossain | Zimbabwe | National Stadium, Dhaka, Bangladesh | 1998–99 |
| 108* | Rajin Saleh | Kenya | Fatullah Osmani Stadium, Fatullah, Bangladesh | 2005–06 |
| 118* | Shahriar Nafees | Zimbabwe | Harare Sports Club, Harare, Zimbabwe | 2006 |
| 123* | Shahriar Nafees | Zimbabwe | Sawai Mansingh Stadium, Jaipur, India | 2006-07 |
| 134* | Shakib Al Hasan | Canada | Antigua Recreation Ground, St. John's, Antigua & Barbuda | 2006-07 |
| 154 | Tamim Iqbal | Zimbabwe | Queens Sports Club, Bulawayo, Zimbabwe | 2009 |
| 158 | Tamim Iqbal | Zimbabwe | Sylhet International Cricket Stadium, Sylhet, Bangladesh | 2019-20 |
| 176 | Liton Das | Zimbabwe | Sylhet International Cricket Stadium, Sylhet, Bangladesh | 2019-20 |
Last updated: 1 July 2020

=== Highest score against each opponent ===
| Opposition | Runs | Player | Venue | Date | Ref |
|---|---|---|---|---|---|
| Afghanistan | 136 | Liton Das | Bir Shrestho Flight Lieutenant Matiur Rahman Cricket Stadium, Chittagong, Bangladesh | 25 September 2022 | |
| Australia | 102* | Mushfiqur Rahim | Trent Bridge, Nottingham, England | 20 June 2019 ‡ | |
| Bermuda | 104* | Shahriar Nafees | Antigua Recreation Ground, St. John's, Antigua and Barbuda | 25 February 2007 | |
| Canada | 134 | Shakib Al Hasan | Antigua Recreation Ground, St. John's, Antigua and Barbuda | 28 February 2007 | |
| England | 128 | Tamim Iqbal | The Oval, London, England | 1 June 2017 | |
| Hong Kong | 68 | Javed Omar | Sinhalese Sports Club Ground, Colombo, Sri Lanka | 16 July 2004 | |
| India | 121 | Liton Das | Dubai International Cricket Stadium, Dubai, UAE | 15 September 2018 | |
| Ireland | 129 | Tamim Iqbal | Sher-e-Bangla National Cricket Stadium, Mirpur, Bangladesh | 22 March 2008 | |
| Kenya | 108* | Rajin Saleh | Fatullah Osmani Stadium, Fatullah, Bangladesh | 25 March 2006 | |
| Netherlands | 73* | Imrul Kayes | Bir Shrestho Flight Lieutenant Matiur Rahman Cricket Stadium, Chittagong, Bangladesh | 14 March 2011 ‡ | |
| New Zealand | 169 | Soumya Sarkar | Saxton Oval, Nelson, New Zealand | 20 December 2023 | |
| Pakistan | 132 | Tamim Iqbal | Sher-e-Bangla National Cricket Stadium, Mirpur, Bangladesh | 17 April 2015 | |
| Scotland | 95 | Tamim Iqbal | Saxton Oval, Nelson, New Zealand | 5 March 2015 ‡ | |
| South Africa | 110* | Mushfiqur Rahim | De Beers Diamond Oval, Kimberley, South Africa | 15 October 2017 | |
| Sri Lanka | 144 | Mushfiqur Rahim | Dubai International Cricket Stadium, Dubai, UAE | 15 September 2018 | |
| United Arab Emirates | 109 | Mohammad Ashraful | Gaddafi Stadium, Lahore, Pakistan | 24 June 2008 | |
| West Indies | 130* | Tamim Iqbal | Providence Stadium, Providence, Guyana | 22 July 2018 | |
| Zimbabwe | 176 | Liton Das | Sylhet International Cricket Stadium, Sylhet, Bangladesh | 6 March 2020 | |
Last updated: 14 November 2024

=== Highest career average ===
A batsman's batting average is the total number of runs they have scored divided by the number of times they have been dismissed.

| Rank | Average | Player | Innings | Runs | Not out | Period |
|---|---|---|---|---|---|---|
| 1 | 37.29 | Shakib Al Hasan | 234 | 7,570 | 31 | 2006–2023 |
| 2 | 36.65 | Tamim Iqbal | 240 | 8,357 | 12 | 2007–2023 |
| 3 | 36.46 | Mahmudullah | 209 | 5,689 | 53 | 2007–2025 |
| 4 | 36.42 | Mushfiqur Rahim | 256 | 7,795 | 42 | 2006–2024 |
| 5 | 34.18 | Towhid Hridoy† | 40 | 1,265 | 3 | 2023–2025 |
Qualification: 20 innings. Last updated: 13 March 2026

=== Highest Average in each batting position ===
| Batting position | Batsman | Innings | Runs | Average | Career span | Ref |
|---|---|---|---|---|---|---|
| Opener | Tamim Iqbal | 240 | 8,357 | 36.65 | 2007–2023 | |
| Number 3 | Shakib Al Hasan | 36 | 1,539 | 49.64 | 2014–2022 | |
| Number 4 | Mahmudullah | 20 | 770 | 51.33 | 2011–2022 | |
| Number 5 | Shakib Al Hasan | 132 | 4,077 | 35.14 | 2006–2023 | |
| Number 6 | Mahmudullah | 75 | 2,201 | 37.30 | 2008–2025 | |
| Number 7 | Mahmudullah | 73 | 1,663 | 34.64 | 2007-2023 | |
| Number 8 | Naeem Islam | 26 | 440 | 25.88 | 2008–2011 | |
| Number 9 | Abdur Razzak | 38 | 368 | 14.15 | 2004–2014 | |
| Number 10 | Mashrafe Mortaza | 21 | 268 | 15.76 | 2003–2019 | |
| Number 11 | Rubel Hossain | 29 | 75 | 6.25 | 2009–2019 | |
Last updated: 13 March 2026. Qualification: Min 20 innings batted at position

=== Most half-centuries ===
A half-century is a score of between 50 and 99 runs. Statistically, once a batsman's score reaches 100, it is no longer considered a half-century but a century.

Sachin Tendulkar of India has scored the most half-centuries in ODIs with 96. He is followed by the Sri Lanka's Kumar Sangakkara on 93, South Africa's Jacques Kallis on 86 and India's Rahul Dravid and Pakistan's Inzamam-ul-Haq on 83.Tamim Iqbal is the leading Bangladeshi in this list with 56 half-centuries.

| Rank | Half centuries | Player | Innings | Runs | Period |
|---|---|---|---|---|---|
| 1 | 56 | Shakib Al Hasan | 234 | 7,570 | 2006–2023 |
| 1 | 56 | Tamim Iqbal | 240 | 8,357 | 2007–2023 |
| 3 | 49 | Mushfiqur Rahim | 256 | 7,795 | 2006–2024 |
| 4 | 32 | Mahmudullah | 209 | 5,689 | 2007–2024 |
| 5 | 20 | Mohammad Ashraful | 168 | 3,468 | 2001–2013 |
Last updated: 6 March 2025

=== Most centuries ===
A century is a score of 100 or more runs in a single inning.

Virat Kohli has scored the most centuries in ODIs with 50. Bangladesh's Tamim Iqbal has the most centuries for Bangladesh.

| Rank | Centuries | Player | Innings | Runs | Period |
|---|---|---|---|---|---|
| 1 | 14 | Tamim Iqbal | 240 | 8,357 | 2007–2023 |
| 2 | 9 | Shakib Al Hasan | 234 | 7,570 | 2006–2023 |
| 2 | 9 | Mushfiqur Rahim | 256 | 7,795 | 2006–2025 |
| 4 | 5 | Litton Das† | 93 | 2,569 | 2015–2024 |
| 5 | 4 | Shahriar Nafees | 75 | 2,201 | 2005–2011 |
| 5 | 4 | Imrul Kayes | 78 | 2,434 | 2008–2018 |
| 5 | 4 | Mahmudullah | 209 | 5,689 | 2007–2025 |
Last updated: 6 March 2025

=== Most Sixes ===
| Rank | Sixes | Player | Innings | Runs | Period |
|---|---|---|---|---|---|
| 1 | 107 | Mahmudullah | 209 | 5,689 | 2007–2025 |
| 2 | 103 | Tamim Iqbal | 240 | 8,357 | 2007–2023 |
| 3 | 100 | Mushfiqur Rahim | 256 | 7,795 | 2006–2024 |
| 4 | 62 | Mashrafe Mortaza | 158 | 1,787 | 2001–2020 |
| 5 | 57 | Soumya Sarkar | 74 | 2,338 | 2014–2025 |
Last updated: 13 March 2026

=== Most Fours ===
| Rank | Fours | Player | Innings | Runs | Period |
|---|---|---|---|---|---|
| 1 | 925 | Tamim Iqbal | 240 | 8,357 | 2007–2023 |
| 2 | 699 | Shakib Al Hasan | 234 | 7,570 | 2006–2023 |
| 3 | 617 | Mushfiqur Rahim | 256 | 7,795 | 2006–2025 |
| 4 | 425 | Mahmudullah | 209 | 5,689 | 2007–2025 |
| 5 | 354 | Mohammad Ashraful | 168 | 3,468 | 2001–2013 |
Last updated: 6 March 2025

=== Highest strike rates ===
Andre Russell of West Indies holds the record for highest strike rate, with minimum 500 balls faced qualification, with 130.22.Soumya Sarkar is the Bangladeshi with the highest strike rate.

| Rank | Strike rate | Player | Runs | Balls faced | Period |
|---|---|---|---|---|---|
| 1 | 103.47 | Tanzid Hasan† | 625 | 604 | 2023–2026 |
| 2 | 94.92 | Soumya Sarkar | 2,338 | 2,463 | 2014–2025 |
| 3 | 91.23 | Sabbir Rahman | 1,333 | 1,461 | 2014–2019 |
| 4 | 88.57 | Afif Hossain† | 667 | 753 | 2020–2026 |
| 5 | 87.72 | Mashrafe Mortaza | 1,773 | 2,021 | 2001–2020 |
Qualification: 500 balls faced. Last updated: 13 March 2026

=== Highest strike rates in an inning ===
James Franklin of New Zealand's strike rate of 387.50 during his 31* off 8 balls against Canada during 2011 Cricket World Cup is the world record for highest strike rate in an innings. Mashrafe Mortaza and Shakib Al Hasan are the highest rated Bangladeshi's on this list.

| Rank | Strike rate | Player | Runs | Balls faced | Opposition | Venue | Date |
|---|---|---|---|---|---|---|---|
| 1 | 278.57 | Rishad Hossain† | 39* | 14 | West Indies | Sher-e-Bangla National Cricket Stadium, Mirpur, Bangladesh | 21 October 2025 |
| 2 | 275.00 | Mashrafe Mortaza | 44* | 16 | Kenya | Shaheed Chandu Stadium, Bogra, Bangladesh | 17 March 2006 |
| 3 | 275.00 | Shakib Al Hasan | 44* | 16 | Pakistan | Sher-e-Bangla National Cricket Stadium, Mirpur, Bangladesh | 4 March 2014 |
| 4 | 272.72 | Mushfiqur Rahim | 30 | 11 | West Indies | Providence Stadium, Providence, Guyana | 22 July 2018 |
| 5 | 266.66 | Rishad Hossain† | 48* | 18 | Sri Lanka | Bir Shrestho Flight Lieutenant Matiur Rahman Cricket Stadium, Chattogram, Bangladesh | 18 March 2024 |
Last updated: 13 March 2026

=== Most runs in a calendar year ===
Tendulkar holds the record for most runs scored in a calendar year with 1894 runs scored in 1998.Shahriar Nafees scored 1033 runs in 2006, the most for a Bangladesh batsman in a year.

| Rank | Runs | Player | Matches | Innings | Year |
|---|---|---|---|---|---|
| 1 | 1,033 | Shahriar Nafees | 28 | 28 | 2006 |
| 2 | 992 | Najmul Hossain Shanto | 27 | 26 | 2023 |
| 3 | 867 | Imrul Kayes | 27 | 27 | 2010 |
| 4 | 846 | Mushfiqur Rahim | 29 | 26 | 2023 |
| 5 | 807 | Tamim Iqbal | 26 | 26 | 2006 |
Last updated:14 November 2024

=== Most runs in a series ===
The 1980-81 Benson & Hedges World Series Cup in Australia saw Greg Chappell set the record for the most runs scored in a single series scoring 685 runs. He is followed by Sachin Tendulkar with 673 runs scored in the 2003 Cricket World Cup. Shakib Al Hasan has scored the most runs in a series for a Bangladesh batsman, when he scored 606 runs in the 2019 Cricket World Cup.

| Rank | Runs | Player | Matches | Innings | Series |
|---|---|---|---|---|---|
| 1 | 606 | Shakib Al Hasan | 8 | 8 | 2019 Cricket World Cup |
| 2 | 367 | Mushfiqur Rahim | 8 | 8 | 2019 Cricket World Cup |
| 3 | 365 | Mahmudullah | 6 | 6 | 2015 Cricket World Cup |
| 4 | 349 | Imrul Kayes | 3 | 3 | Zimbabwean cricket team in Bangladesh in 2018-19 |
| 5 | 328 | Mahmudullah | 8 | 7 | 2023 Cricket World Cup |
Last updated: 14 November 2024

=== Most ducks ===
A duck refers to a batsman being dismissed without scoring a run. Sanath Jayasuriya has scored the equal highest number of ducks in ODIs with 34 such knocks. Tamim Iqbal and hold this dubious record for Bangladesh.

| Rank | Ducks | Player | Matches | Innings | Period |
|---|---|---|---|---|---|
| 1 | 19 | Tamim Iqbal | 243 | 240 | 2007–2023 |
| 2 | 18 | Habibul Bashar | 111 | 105 | 1995–2007 |
| 3 | 16 | Litton Das† | 95 | 94 | 2015–2025 |
| 4 | 15 | Mohammad Rafique | 123 | 104 | 1995–2007 |
| 4 | 15 | Mashrafe Mortaza | 218 | 156 | 2001–2020 |
| 5 | 13 | Mohammad Ashraful | 172 | 168 | 2001-2013 |
Last updated: 8 July 2025

== Bowling records ==
=== Most career wickets ===
A bowler takes the wicket of a batsman when the form of dismissal is bowled, caught, leg before wicket, stumped or hit wicket. If the batsman is dismissed by run out, obstructing the field, handling the ball, hitting the ball twice or timed out the bowler does not receive credit.

Shakib Al Hasan is the leading Bangladesh bowler on the list of leading ODI wicket-takers when he overtook Mashrafe Mortaza in the first ODI of the tour of Zimbabwe in July 2021.

| Rank | Wickets | Player | Matches | Innings | Average | SR | 4 | 5 | Period |
|---|---|---|---|---|---|---|---|---|---|
| 1 | 317 | Shakib Al Hasan | 247 | 241 | 29.52 | 39.66 | 10 | 4 | 2006–2023 |
| 2 | 269 | Mashrafe Mortaza | 218 | 218 | 32.65 | 40.2 | 7 | 1 | 2001–2020 |
| 3 | 207 | Abdur Razzak | 153 | 152 | 29.29 | 38.4 | 5 | 4 | 2004–2014 |
| 4 | 178 | Mustafizur Rahman† | 117 | 115 | 26.96 | 31.33 | 6 | 5 | 2015–2026 |
| 5 | 129 | Rubel Hossain | 104 | 102 | 34.31 | 36.2 | 7 | 1 | 2009–2021 |
| 6 | 124 | Mehidy Hasan Miraz† | 115 | 112 | 35.90 | 45.30 | 5 | 0 | 2017–2026 |
| 7 | 119 | Mohammad Rafique | 123 | 122 | 38.75 | 52.8 | 2 | 1 | 1995–2007 |
| 8 | 118 | Taskin Ahmed† | 84 | 82 | 29.85 | 33.42 | 6 | 2 | 2014–2025 |
| 9 | 82 | Mahmudullah | 239 | 153 | 46.45 | 53.41 | 0 | 0 | 2007–2025 |
| 10 | 70 | Shafiul Islam | 60 | 60 | 36.11 | 36.2 | 4 | 0 | 2010–2020 |
Last updated: 13 March 2026

=== Fastest wicket taker ===
| Wickets | Bowler | Match | Record date | Reference |
|---|---|---|---|---|
| 50 | Mustafizur Rahman | 27 | 27 January 2018 | |
| 100 | Mustafizur Rahman | 54 | 5 July 2019 ‡ | |
| 150 | Mustafizur Rahman | 91 | 15 September 2023 | |
| 200 | Abdur Razzak | 141 | 28 March 2013 | |
| 250 | Mashrafe Mortaza | 194 | 23 September 2018 | |
| 300 | Shakib Al Hasan | 227 | 6 March 2023 | |
Last updated: 6 March 2023

=== Most career wickets against each team ===
| Opposition | Wickets | Player | Matches | Innings | Average | Period | Ref |
|---|---|---|---|---|---|---|---|
| Afghanistan | 30 | Shakib Al Hasan | 15 | 15 | 18.56 | 2015–2023 | |
| Australia | 15 | Mashrafe Mortaza | 16 | 16 | 45.73 | 2003–2019 | |
| Bermuda | 4 | Abdur Razzak | 2 | 2 | 13.00 | 2007–2007 | |
| Canada | 3 | Abdur Razzak | 1 | 1 | 17.00 | 2007–2007 | |
| England | 21 | Shakib Al Hasan | 18 | 18 | 41.00 | 2007–2023 | |
| Hong Kong | 3 | Abdur Razzak | 1 | 1 | 5.66 | 2004–2019 | |
| India | 29 | Shakib Al Hasan | 22 | 22 | 32.65 | 2007–2023 | |
| Ireland | 13 | Shakib Al Hasan | 15 | 11 | 32.92 | 2007–2023 | |
| Kenya | 19 | Mohammad Rafique | 14 | 14 | 42.00 | 1997–2006 | |
| Kenya | 19 | Mashrafe Mortaza | 7 | 7 | 18.46 | 2006–2006 | |
| Netherlands | 4 | Shakib Al Hasan | 3 | 3 | 27.75 | 2010–2023 | |
| New Zealand | 38 | Shakib Al Hasan | 23 | 23 | 26.36 | 2007–2023 | |
| Pakistan | 21 | Shakib Al Hasan | 18 | 18 | 36.23 | 2008–2023 | |
| Scotland | 6 | Abdur Razzak | 2 | 2 | 6.5 | 2006–2006 | |
| South Africa | 17 | Shakib Al Hasan | 18 | 18 | 46.94 | 2007–2023 | |
| Sri Lanka | 28 | Taskin Ahmed | 15 | 15 | 26.39 | 2015–2025 | |
| United Arab Emirates | 3 | Abdur Razzak | 1 | 1 | 6.33 | 2008–2008 | |
| West Indies | 30 | Mashrafe Mortaza | 19 | 19 | 26.03 | 2006–2019 | |
| Zimbabwe | 82 | Shakib Al Hasan | 48 | 48 | 20.48 | 2006–2021 | |
Last updated: 13 March 2026

=== Best figures in an innings ===
Bowling figures refers to the number of the wickets a bowler has taken and the number of runs conceded. Sri Lanka's Chaminda Vaas holds the world record for best figures in an innings when he took 8/19 against Zimbabwe in December 2001 at Colombo (SSC). Mortaza and Rubel Hossain hold the Bangladeshi record for best bowling figures.

| Rank | Figures | Player | Opposition | Venue | Date |
|---|---|---|---|---|---|
| 1 | 6/26 | Mashrafe Mortaza | Kenya | Gymkhana Club Ground, Nairobi, Kenya | 15 August 2006 |
| 1 | 6/26 | Rubel Hossain | New Zealand | Sher-e-Bangla National Cricket Stadium, Mirpur, Bangladesh | 29 October 2013 |
| 3 | 6/35 | Rishad Hossain | West Indies | Sher-e-Bangla National Cricket Stadium, Mirpur, Bangladesh | 18 October 2025 |
| 4 | 6/43 | Mustafizur Rahman | India | Sher-e-Bangla National Cricket Stadium, Mirpur, Bangladesh | 21 June 2015 |
| 5 | 6/48 | Shoriful Islam | Australia | Sher-e-Bangla National Cricket Stadium, Mirpur, Bangladesh | 14 June 2026 |
Last updated: 13 March 2026

=== Best figures in an innings – progression of record ===
| Figures | Player | Opposition | Venue | Date |
|---|---|---|---|---|
| 2/23 | Jahangir Shah | Pakistan | Tyronne Fernando Stadium, Moratuwa, Sri Lanka | 1985–86 |
| 4/36 | Saiful Islam | Sri Lanka | Sharjah Cricket Stadium, Sharjah, United Arab Emirates | 1995 |
| 4/19 | Khaled Mahmud | Zimbabwe | Harare Sports Club, Harare, Zimbabwe | 2003–04 |
| 4/16 | Tapash Baisya | West Indies | Arnos Vale Stadium, Kingstown, Saint Vincent & the Grenadines | 2004 |
| 5/31 | Aftab Ahmed | New Zealand | National Stadium, Dhaka, Bangladesh | 2004–05 |
| 6/26 | Mashrafe Mortaza | Kenya | Gymkhana Club Ground, Nairobi, Kenya | 2006 |
| 6/26 | Rubel Hossain | New Zealand | Sher-e-Bangla National Cricket Stadium, Mirpur, Bangladesh | 2013–14 |
Last updated: 1 July 2020

=== Best Bowling Figure against each opponent ===
| Opposition | Figures | Player | Venue | Date | Ref |
|---|---|---|---|---|---|
| Afghanistan | 5/29 | Shakib Al Hasan | Rose Bowl, Southampton, England | 24 June 2019 ‡ | |
| Australia | 6/48 | Shoriful Islam | Shere Bangla National Stadium, Mirpur, Bangladesh | 14 June 2026 | |
| Bermuda | 3/20 | Abdur Razzak | Queens Sports Club, Port of Spain, Trinidad & Tobago | 25 March 2007 ‡ | |
| Canada | 3/51 | Abdur Razzak | Antigua Recreation Ground, St. John's, Antigua and Barbuda | 28 February 2007 | |
| England | 4/29 | Mashrafe Mortaza | Sher-e-Bangla National Cricket Stadium, Mirpur, Bangladesh | 9 October 2016 | |
| Hong Kong | 3/17 | Abdur Razzak | Sinhalese Sports Club Ground, Colombo, Sri Lanka | 16 July 2004 | |
| India | 6/43 | Mustafizur Rahman | Sher-e-Bangla National Cricket Stadium, Mirpur, Bangladesh | 21 June 2015 | |
| Ireland | 5/32 | Hasan Mahmud | Sher-e-Bangla National Cricket Stadium, Mirpur, Bangladesh | 23 March 2023 | |
| Kenya | 6/25 | Mashrafe Mortaza | Gymkhana Club Ground, Nairobi, Kenya | 15 August 2006 | |
| Netherlands | 3/29 | Abdur Razzak | Bir Shrestho Flight Lieutenant Matiur Rahman Cricket Stadium, Chittagong, Bangladesh | 14 March 2011 ‡ | |
| New Zealand | 6/26 | Rubel Hossain | Sher-e-Bangla National Cricket Stadium, Mirpur, Bangladesh | 29 October 2013 | |
| Pakistan | 5/24 | Nahid Rana | Sher-e-Bangla National Cricket Stadium, Mirpur, Bangladesh | 11 March 2026 | |
| Scotland | 4/23 | Abdur Razzak | Sher-e-Bangla National Cricket Stadium, Mirpur, Bangladesh | 17 December 2006 | |
| South Africa | 5/35 | Taskin Ahmed | Supersports Park, Centurion, South Africa | 23 March 2022 | |
| Sri Lanka | 5/39 | Tanvir Islam | R. Premadasa Stadium, Colombo, Sri Lanka | 5 July 2025 | |
| United Arab Emirates | 3/22 | Abdur Razzak | Gaddafi Stadium, Lahore, Pakistan | 24 June 2008 | |
| West Indies | 6/35 | Rishad Hossain | Sher-e-Bangla National Cricket Stadium, Mirpur, Bangladesh | 18 October 2025 | |
| Zimbabwe | 5/29 | Abdur Razzak | Sher-e-Bangla National Cricket Stadium, Mirpur, Bangladesh | 9 October 2009 | |
Last updated: 13 March 2026.

=== Best career average ===
A bowler's bowling average is the total number of runs they have conceded divided by the number of wickets they have taken. Nepal's Sandeep Lamichhane holds the record for the best career average in ODIs with 15.57. Mustafizur Rahman of Bangladesh is the highest-ranked Bangladeshi when the qualification of 2000 balls bowled is followed.

| Rank | Average | Player | Wickets | Runs | Balls | Period |
|---|---|---|---|---|---|---|
| 1 | 26.96 | Mustafizur Rahman† | 178 | 4,800 | 5,577 | 2015–2026 |
| 2 | 29.29 | Abdur Razzak | 207 | 6,065 | 7,965 | 2004–2014 |
| 3 | 29.52 | Shakib Al Hasan | 317 | 9,360 | 12,575 | 2006–2023 |
| 4 | 29.85 | Taskin Ahmed† | 118 | 3,523 | 3,944 | 2014–2026 |
| 5 | 32.65 | Mashrafe Mortaza | 269 | 8,785 | 10,827 | 2001–2020 |
Qualification: 2,000 balls. Last updated: 13 March 2026

=== Best career economy rate ===
A bowler's economy rate is the total number of runs they have conceded divided by the number of overs they have bowled. West Indies' Joel Garner, holds the ODI record for the best career economy rate with 3.09. Bangladesh's Mohammad Rafique, with a rate of 4.39 runs per over conceded over his 123-match ODI career, is the highest Bangladeshi on the list.

| Rank | Economy rate | Player | Wickets | Runs | Balls | Period |
|---|---|---|---|---|---|---|
| 1 | 4.39 | Mohammad Rafique | 119 | 4,612 | 6,294 | 1995–2007 |
| 2 | 4.46 | Shakib Al Hasan | 317 | 9,360 | 12,575 | 2006–2023 |
| 3 | 4.56 | Abdur Razzak | 207 | 6,065 | 7,965 | 2004–2014 |
| 4 | 4.63 | Syed Rasel | 61 | 2,051 | 2,657 | 2005–2010 |
| 5 | 4.75 | Mehidy Hasan Miraz† | 124 | 4,452 | 5,618 | 2017–2026 |
Qualification: 2,000 balls. Last updated: 13 March 2026

=== Best career strike rate ===
A bowler's strike rate is the total number of balls they have bowled divided by the number of wickets they have taken. The top bowler with the best ODI career strike rate is South Africa's Lungi Ngidi with strike rate of 23.2 balls per wicket. Bangladesh's Mustafizur Rahman is the highest-ranked Bangladeshi in this list.

| Rank | Strike rate | Player | Wickets | Runs | Balls | Period |
|---|---|---|---|---|---|---|
| 1 | 31.33 | Mustafizur Rahman† | 178 | 4,800 | 5,577 | 2015–2026 |
| 2 | 33.42 | Taskin Ahmed† | 118 | 3,523 | 3,944 | 2014–2026 |
| 3 | 36.26 | Rubel Hossain | 129 | 4,427 | 4,678 | 2009–2021 |
| 4 | 36.28 | Shafiul Islam | 70 | 2,529 | 2,540 | 2010–2020 |
| 5 | 38.47 | Abdur Razzak | 207 | 6,065 | 7,965 | 2004–2014 |
Qualification: 2,000 balls. Last updated: 13 March 2026

=== Most four-wickets (& over) hauls in an innings ===
Shakib Al Hasan is joint-24th on the list of most four-wicket hauls with Pakistan's Waqar Younis, Sri Lanka's Muttiah Muralitharan and Australia's Brett Lee leading this list in ODIs.

| Rank | Four-wicket hauls | Player | Innings | Balls | Wickets | Period |
|---|---|---|---|---|---|---|
| 1 | 14 | Shakib Al Hasan | 241 | 12,575 | 317 | 2006–2023 |
| 2 | 11 | Mustafizur Rahman† | 108 | 5,279 | 174 | 2015–2025 |
| 3 | 9 | Abdur Razzak | 152 | 7,965 | 207 | 2004–2014 |
| 4 | 8 | Rubel Hossain | 102 | 4,678 | 129 | 2009–2021 |
| 4 | 8 | Mashrafe Mortaza | 218 | 10,827 | 269 | 2001–2020 |
| 4 | 8 | Taskin Ahmed | 78 | 3,782 | 115 | 2014-2025 |
Last updated: 8 July 2025

=== Most five-wicket hauls in a match ===
A five-wicket haul refers to a bowler taking five wickets in a single innings. Mustafizur Rahman is the highest ranked Bangladeshi on the list of most five-wicket hauls which is headed by Pakistan's Waqar Younis with 13 such hauls.

| Rank | Five-wicket hauls | Player | Matches | Innings | Wickets | Period |
|---|---|---|---|---|---|---|
| 1 | 5 | Mustafizur Rahman† | 109 | 108 | 174 | 2015–2025 |
| 2 | 4 | Abdur Razzak | 153 | 152 | 207 | 2004–2014 |
| 2 | 4 | Shakib Al Hasan | 247 | 241 | 317 | 2006–2023 |
| 4 | 2 | Taskin Ahmed† | 79 | 77 | 111 | 2014–2025 |
| 5 | 1 | Tanvir Islam | 9 | 9 | 16 | 2025-2025 |
| 5 | 1 | Rishad Hossain | 15 | 15 | 22 | 2023-2026 |
| 5 | 1 | Abu Jayed | 2 | 2 | 5 | 2019-2019 |
| 5 | 1 | Ziaur Rahman | 13 | 11 | 10 | 2013–2014 |
| 5 | 1 | Taijul Islam† | 20 | 20 | 31 | 2014-2014 |
| 5 | 1 | Hasan Mahmud† | 26 | 25 | 31 | 2021–2024 |
| 5 | 1 | Aftab Ahmed | 85 | 30 | 12 | 2004–2010 |
| 5 | 1 | Farhad Reza | 34 | 32 | 22 | 2006–2011 |
| 5 | 1 | Rubel Hossain | 104 | 102 | 129 | 2009–2021 |
| 5 | 1 | Mohammad Rafique | 123 | 122 | 119 | 1995–2007 |
| 5 | 1 | Mashrafe Mortaza | 218 | 218 | 269 | 2001–2020 |
Last updated: 13 March 2026

=== Best economy rates in an inning ===
The best economy rate in an inning, when a minimum of 30 balls are delivered by the player, is West Indies player Phil Simmons economy of 0.30 during his spell of 3 runs for 4 wickets in 10 overs against Pakistan at Sydney Cricket Ground in the 1991–92 Australian Tri-Series. Shakib Al Hasan holds the Bangladeshi record during his spell in first ODI against Zimbabwe at Mirpur, Dhaka.

| Rank | Economy | Player | Overs | Runs | Wickets | Opposition | Venue | Date |
|---|---|---|---|---|---|---|---|---|
| 1 | 1.09 | Shakib Al Hasan | 7.2 | 8 | 4 | West Indies | Bir Shrestho Flight Lieutenant Matiur Rahman Cricket Stadium, Chittagong, Bangladesh | 20 January 2021 |
| 2 | 1.10 | Shakib Al Hasan | 10 | 11 | 3 | Zimbabwe | Sher-e-Bangla National Cricket Stadium, Mirpur, Bangladesh | 19 January 2009 |
| 3 | 1.16 | Mahmudullah † | 6 | 7 | 1 | Zimbabwe | Sher-e-Bangla National Cricket Stadium, Mirpur, Bangladesh | 19 January 2009 |
| 4 | 1.17 | Shakib Al Hasan | 6.5 | 8 | 3 | Zimbabwe | Bir Shrestho Flight Lieutenant Matiur Rahman Cricket Stadium, Chittagong, Bangladesh | 3 November 2009 |
| 5 | 1.30 | Shakib Al Hasan | 10 | 13 | 1 | Scotland | Bir Shrestho Flight Lieutenant Matiur Rahman Cricket Stadium, Chittagong, Bangladesh | 15 December 2006 |
Qualification: 30 balls bowled. Last updated: 14 November 2024

=== Best strike rates in an inning ===
The best strike rate in an inning, when a minimum of 4 wickets are taken by the player, is shared by Sunil Dhaniram of Canada, Paul Collingwood of England and Virender Sehwag of Bangladesh when they achieved a strike rate of 4.2 balls per wicket. Rubel Hossain during his spell of 6/26 achieved the best strike rate for a Bangladeshi bowler.

| Rank | Strike rate | Player | Wickets | Runs | Balls | Opposition | Venue | Date |
|---|---|---|---|---|---|---|---|---|
| 1 | 5.8 | Rubel Hossain | 6 | 26 | 35 | New Zealand | Sher-e-Bangla National Cricket Stadium, Mirpur, Bangladesh | 29 October 2013 |
| 2 | 6.7 | Rajin Saleh | 4 | 16 | 27 | Zimbabwe | Harare Sports Club, Harare, Zimbabwe | 6 August 2006 |
| 3 | 7.5 | Tapash Baisya | 4 | 16 | 30 | West Indies | Arnos Vale Stadium, Kingstown, Saint Vincent & the Grenadines | 16 May 2004 |
| 3 | 7.5 | Shakib Al Hasan | 4 | 16 | 30 | West Indies | Bir Shrestho Flight Lieutenant Matiur Rahman Cricket Stadium, Chittagong, Bangladesh | 18 October 2011 |
| 5 | 8.0 | Mustafizur Rahman | 4 | 17 | 32 | Zimbabwe | Harare Sports Club, Harare, Zimbabwe | 10 August 2022 |
Last updated: 14 November 2024

=== Worst figures in an innings ===
The worst figures in an ODI came in the 5th One Day International between South Africa at home to Australia in 2006. Australia's Mick Lewis returned figures of 0/113 from his 10 overs in the second innings of the match. The worst figures by a Bangladeshi is 0/87 that came off the bowling of Tapash Baisya in the 2005 Natwest Series game against England at Nottingham.

| Rank | Figures | Player | Overs | Opposition | Venue | Date |
|---|---|---|---|---|---|---|
| 1 | 0/87 | Tapash Baisya | 7 | England | Trent Bridge, Nottingham, England | 21 June 2005 |
| 2 | 0/85 | Nasum Ahmed† | 10 | Australia | Maharashtra Cricket Association Stadium, Pune, India | 11 November 2023‡ |
| 3 | 0/83 | Rubel Hossain | 9 | Australia | Trent Bridge, Nottingham, England | 20 June 2019 ‡ |
| 4 | 0/82 | Mohammad Rafique | 10 | Zimbabwe | National Stadium, Dhaka, Bangladesh | 25 November 2001 |
| 4 | 0/82 | Taskin Ahmed† | 10 | Sri Lanka | Melbourne Cricket Ground, Melbourne, Australia | 26 February 2015 ‡ |
| 4 | 0/82 | Mashrafe Mortaza | 10 | South Africa | Boland Park, Paarl, South Africa | 18 October 2017 |
Last updated: 14 November 2024

=== Most runs conceded in a match ===
Mick Lewis also holds the dubious distinction of most runs conceded in an ODI during the aforementioned match. The top two Bangladeshi records in ODIs are held by Shafiul Islam.

| Rank | Figures | Player | Overs | Opposition | Venue | Date |
|---|---|---|---|---|---|---|
| 1 | 2/97 | Shafiul Islam | 9 | England | Edgbaston, Birmingham, England | 12 July 2010 |
| 2 | 3/95 | Shafiul Islam | 10 | Pakistan | Rangiri Dambulla International Stadium, Dambulla, Sri Lanka | 21 June 2010 |
| 3 | 2/93 | Mustafizur Rahman† | 10 | New Zealand | University Oval, Dunedin, New Zealand | 20 February 2019 |
| 4 | 2/89 | Taskin Ahmed† | 9 | India | Bir Shrestho Flight Lieutenant Matiur Rahman Cricket Stadium, Chattogram, Bangladesh | 10 December 2022 |
| 5 | 1/88 | Abdur Razzak | 9 | South Africa | Willowmoore Park, Benoni, South Africa | 9 November 2008 |
Last updated: 14 November 2024

=== Most wickets in a calendar year ===
Pakistan's Saqlain Mushtaq holds the record for most wickets taken in a year when he took 69 wickets in 1997 in 36 ODIs. Bangladesh's Mashrafe Mortaza is the highest Bangladeshi on the list having taken 49 wickets in 2006.

| Rank | Wickets | Player | Matches | Year |
|---|---|---|---|---|
| 1 | 49 | Mashrafe Mortaza | 27 | 2006 |
| 2 | 46 | Shakib Al Hasan† | 27 | 2010 |
| 3 | 45 | Abdur Razzak | 26 | 2006 |
| 4 | 34 | Mohammad Rafique | 26 | 2006 |
| 4 | 34 | Mustafizur Rahman† | 16 | 2019 |
Last updated: 14 November 2024

=== Most wickets in a series ===
1998–99 Carlton and United Series involving Australia, England and Sri Lanka and the 2019 Cricket World Cup saw the records set for the most wickets taken by a bowler in an ODI series when Australian pacemen Glenn McGrath and Mitchell Starc achieved a total of 27 wickets during the series, respectively. Bangladesh's Mustafizur Rahman is joint 26th with his 20 wickets taken during the 2019 Cricket World Cup.

| Rank | Wickets | Player | Matches | Series |
|---|---|---|---|---|
| 1 | 20 | Mustafizur Rahman† | 8 | 2019 Cricket World Cup |
| 2 | 15 | Abdur Razzak | 5 | Zimbabwean cricket team in Bangladesh in 2009–10 |
| 3 | 13 | Abdur Razzak | 4 | Zimbabwean cricket team in Bangladesh in 2010–11 |
| 3 | 13 | Mustafizur Rahman† | 3 | Indian cricket team in Bangladesh in 2015 |
| 3 | 13 | Abdur Razzak | 9 | 2007 Cricket World Cup |
| 3 | 13 | Mohammad Saifuddin | 7 | 2019 Cricket World Cup |
Last updated: 13 March 2026

=== Hat-trick ===
In cricket, a hat-trick occurs when a bowler takes three wickets with consecutive deliveries. The deliveries may be interrupted by an over bowled by another bowler from the other end of the pitch or the other team's innings, but must be three consecutive deliveries by the individual bowler in the same match. Only wickets attributed to the bowler count towards a hat-trick; run outs do not count. In ODIs history there have been just 49 hat-tricks, the first achieved by Jalal-ud-Din for Pakistan against Australia in 1982.

| No. | Bowler | Against | Dismissals | Venue | Date | Ref. |
|---|---|---|---|---|---|---|
| 1 | Shahadat Hossain | Zimbabwe | • Tafadzwa Mufambisi (c †Khaled Mashud) • Elton Chigumbura (lbw) • Tawanda Mupariwa (c †Khaled Mashud) | (Zimbabwe) Harare Sports Club, Harare | 2 August 2006 | |
| 2 | Abdur Razzak | Zimbabwe | • Prosper Utseya (c Naeem Islam) • Ray Price (lbw) • Christopher Mpofu (lbw) | (Bangladesh) Sher-e-Bangla National Cricket Stadium, Mirpur | 3 December 2010 | |
| 3 | Rubel Hossain | New Zealand | • Corey Anderson (b) • Brendon McCullum (c Shamsur Rahman (sub)) • Jimmy Neesham (c †Mushfiqur Rahim) | (Bangladesh) Sher-e-Bangla National Cricket Stadium, Mirpur | 29 October 2013 | |
| 4 | Taijul Islam | Zimbabwe | • Tinashe Panyangara (b) • John Nyumbu (lbw) • Tendai Chatara (b) | (Bangladesh) Sher-e-Bangla National Cricket Stadium, Mirpur | 1 December 2014 | |
| 5 | Taskin Ahmed | Sri Lanka | • Asela Gunaratne (c Soumya Sarkar) • Suranga Lakmal (c Mustafizur Rahman) • Nuwan Pradeep (b) | (Sri Lanka) Rangiri Dambulla International Stadium, Dambulla | 28 March 2017 | |

== Wicket-keeping records ==
The wicket-keeper is a specialist fielder who stands behind the stumps being guarded by the batsman on strike and is the only member of the fielding side allowed to wear gloves and leg pads.

=== Most career dismissals ===
A wicket-keeper can be credited with the dismissal of a batsman in two ways, caught or stumped. A fair catch is taken when the ball is caught fully within the field of play without it bouncing after the ball has touched the striker's bat or glove holding the bat, Laws 5.6.2.2 and 5.6.2.3 state that the hand or the glove holding the bat shall be regarded as the ball striking or touching the bat while a stumping occurs when the wicket-keeper puts down the wicket while the batsman is out of his ground and not attempting a run. Bangladesh's Mushfiqur Rahim is eight in taking most dismissals in ODIs as a designated wicket-keeper with Sri Lanka's Kumar Sangakkara and Australian Adam Gilchrist heading the list.

| Rank | Dismissals | Player | Matches | Innings | Catches | Stumping | Dis/inn | Period |
|---|---|---|---|---|---|---|---|---|
| 1 | 297 | Mushfiqur Rahim | 274 | 258 | 241 | 56 | 1.151 | 2006–2025 |
| 2 | 126 | Khaled Mashud | 126 | 126 | 91 | 35 | 1.000 | 1995–2006 |
| 3 | 17 | Litton Das† | 96 | 16 | 17 | 4 | 1.312 | 2015–2026 |
| 4 | 10 | Nurul Hasan† | 13 | 13 | 12 | 5 | 1.307 | 2016–2025 |
| 5 | 13 | Dhiman Ghosh | 14 | 14 | 9 | 4 | 0.928 | 2008-2008 |
Last updated: 13 March 2026

=== Most career catches ===
Rahim is 11th in taking most catches in ODIs as a designated wicket-keeper.

| Rank | Catches | Player | Matches | Innings | Period |
|---|---|---|---|---|---|
| 1 | 241 | Mushfiqur Rahim | 274 | 258 | 2006–2025 |
| 2 | 91 | Khaled Mashud | 126 | 126 | 1995–2006 |
| 3 | 17 | Litton Das† | 96 | 16 | 2015–2026 |
| 4 | 12 | Nurul Hasan | 13 | 13 | 2016–2025 |
| 5 | 9 | Dhiman Ghosh | 14 | 14 | 2008-2008 |
Last updated: 13 March 2026

=== Most career stumpings ===
Dhoni holds the record for the most stumpings in ODIs with 123 followed by Sri Lankans Sangakkara and Romesh Kaluwitharana.

| Rank | Stumpings | Player | Matches | Innings | Period |
|---|---|---|---|---|---|
| 1 | 56 | Mushfiqur Rahim | 274 | 258 | 2006–2025 |
| 2 | 35 | Khaled Mashud | 126 | 126 | 1995–2006 |
| 3 | 5 | Nurul Hasan | 13 | 13 | 2016–2025 |
| 4 | 4 | Liton Das† | 18 | 16 | 2015–2026 |
| 4 | 4 | Dhiman Ghosh | 14 | 14 | 2008–2008 |
Last updated: 13 March 2026

=== Most dismissals in an innings ===
Ten wicket-keepers on 15 occasions have taken six dismissals in a single innings in an ODI. Adam Gilchrist of Australia alone has done it six times.

The feat of taking 5 dismissals in an innings has been achieved by 49 wicket-keepers on 87 occasions including 2 Bangladeshis.

| Rank | Dismissals | Player | Opposition | Venue | Date |
|---|---|---|---|---|---|
| 1 | 5 | Khaled Mashud | Kenya | Gymkhana Club Ground, Nairobi, Kenya | 12 August 2006 |
| 1 | 5 | Mushfiqur Rahim | India | Sher-e-Bangla National Cricket Stadium, Mirpur, Bangladesh | 18 June 2015 |
| 3 | 4 | Khaled Mashud | Zimbabwe | Aga Khan Sports Club Ground, Nairobi, Kenya | 14 October 1997 |
| 3 | 4 | Khaled Mashud | Zimbabwe | Harare Sports Club, Harare, Zimbabwe | 30 July 2006 |
| 3 | 4 | Mushfiqur Rahim | Zimbabwe | Harare Sports Club, Harare, Zimbabwe | 4 February 2007 |
| 3 | 4 | Dhiman Ghosh | Pakistan | Gaddafi Stadium, Lahore, Pakistan | 8 April 2008 |
| 3 | 4 | Mushfiqur Rahim | Ireland | Stormont, Belfast, Northern Ireland | 16 July 2010 |
| 3 | 4 | Mushfiqur Rahim | Zimbabwe | Sher-e-Bangla National Cricket Stadium, Mirpur, Bangladesh | 6 December 2010 |
| 3 | 4 | Mushfiqur Rahim | Zimbabwe | Queens Sports Club, Bulawayo, Zimbabwe | 19 August 2011 |
| 3 | 4 | Mushfiqur Rahim | Pakistan | Bir Shrestho Flight Lieutenant Matiur Rahman Cricket Stadium, Chittagong, Bangladesh | 6 December 2011 |
| 3 | 4 | Mushfiqur Rahim | England | Adelaide Oval, Adelaide, Australia | 9 March 2015 ‡ |
| 3 | 4 | Liton Das | India | Sher-e-Bangla National Cricket Stadium, Mirpur, Bangladesh | 21 June 2015 |
| 3 | 4 | Mushfiqur Rahim | India | Dubai International Cricket Stadium, Dubai, United Arab Emirates | 28 September 2018 |
| 3 | 4 | Mushfiqur Rahim | West Indies | Bir Shrestho Flight Lieutenant Matiur Rahman Cricket Stadium, Chittagong, Bangladesh | 25 January 2021 |
| 3 | 4 | Mushfiqur Rahim | South Africa | SuperSport Park, Centurion, South Africa | 23 March 2022 |
Last updated: 14 July 2022

=== Most dismissals in a series ===
Gilchrist also holds the ODIs record for the most dismissals taken by a wicket-keeper in a series. He made 27 dismissals during the 1998–99 Carlton & United Series. Bangladeshi record is held by Khaled Mashud when he made 11 dismissals during the tour of Zimbabwe in 2006.

| Rank | Dismissals | Player | Matches | Innings | Series |
|---|---|---|---|---|---|
| 1 | 11 | Khaled Mashud | 5 | 5 | Bangladeshi cricket team in Zimbabwe in 2006 |
| 2 | 10 | Mushfiqur Rahim | 8 | 8 | 2019 Cricket World Cup |
| 2 | 10 | Mushfiqur Rahim | 3 | 3 | Sri Lankan cricket team in Bangladesh in 2023–24 |
| 4 | 9 | Mushfiqur Rahim | 4 | 4 | Zimbabwean cricket team in Bangladesh in 2010-11 |
| 4 | 9 | Mushfiqur Rahim | 5 | 5 | Bangladeshi cricket team in Zimbabwe in 2011 |
| 4 | 9 | Mushfiqur Rahim | 5 | 5 | West Indian cricket team in Bangladesh in 2012-13 |
Last updated: 14 November 2024

== Fielding records ==
=== Most career catches ===
Caught is one of the nine methods a batsman can be dismissed in cricket. (Note: In 2017, The Laws of Cricket were amended, reducing the methods of dismissals from ten to nine, with handled the ball now covered as part of obstructing the field.) The majority of catches are caught in the slips, located behind the batsman, next to the wicket-keeper, on the off side of the field. Most slip fielders are top order batsmen.

Sri Lanka's Mahela Jayawardene holds the record for the most catches in ODIs by a non-wicket-keeper with 218, followed by Ricky Ponting of Australia on 160 and Bangladeshi Mohammad Azharuddin with 156.Mahmudullah is the leading catcher for Bangladesh.

| Rank | Catches | Player | Matches | Innings | Ct/inn | Period |
|---|---|---|---|---|---|---|
| 1 | 82 | Mahmudullah | 239 | 238 | 0.344 | 2007–2025 |
| 2 | 68 | Tamim Iqbal | 243 | 241 | 0.282 | 2007–2023 |
| 3 | 61 | Mashrafe Mortaza | 218 | 218 | 0.279 | 2001–2020 |
| 4 | 60 | Shakib Al Hasan | 247 | 245 | 0.244 | 2006–2023 |
| 5 | 49 | Mehidy Hasan Miraz† | 115 | 114 | 0.429 | 2017–2026 |
Last updated: 13 March 2026

=== Most catches in an innings ===
South Africa's Jonty Rhodes is the only fielder to have taken five catches in an innings.

The feat of taking 4 catches in an innings has been achieved by 42 fielders on 44 occasions with Somuya Sarkar being the only Bangladesh fielder.

| Rank | Dismissals | Player | Opposition | Venue | Date |
|---|---|---|---|---|---|
| 1 | 4 | Soumya Sarkar | Scotland | Saxton Oval, Nelson, New Zealand | 5 March 2015 ‡ |
| 2 | 3 | Enamul Haque | Kenya | M. A. Chidambaram Stadium, Chennai, India | 23 May 1998 |
| 2 | 3 | Aftab Ahmed | Sri Lanka | Ranasinghe Premadasa Stadium, Colombo, Sri Lanka | 23 July 2007 |
| 2 | 3 | Junaid Siddique | New Zealand | Sher-e-Bangla National Cricket Stadium, Mirpur, Bangladesh | 11 October 2008 |
| 2 | 3 | Junaid Siddique | Zimbabwe | Bir Shrestho Flight Lieutenant Matiur Rahman Cricket Stadium, Chittagong, Bangladesh | 5 November 2009 |
| 2 | 3 | Shakib Al Hasan | Sri Lanka | Rangiri Dambulla International Stadium, Dambulla, Sri Lanka | 18 June 2010 |
| 2 | 3 | Sabbir Rahman | Zimbabwe | Sher-e-Bangla National Cricket Stadium, Mirpur, Bangladesh | 11 November 2015 |
| 2 | 3 | Mahmudullah | Sri Lanka | Sinhalese Sports Club Ground, Colombo, Sri Lanka | 1 April 2017 |
| 2 | 3 | Sabbir Rahman | Zimbabwe | Sher-e-Bangla National Cricket Stadium, Mirpur, Bangladesh | 23 January 2018 |
| 2 | 3 | Mahmudullah | West Indies | Providence Stadium, Providence, West Indies | 22 July 2018 |
| 2 | 3 | Mehidy Hasan Miraz | West Indies | Sher-e-Bangla National Cricket Stadium, Mirpur, Bangladesh | 9 December 2018 |
| 2 | 3 | Liton Das | Ireland | Clontarf Cricket Club Ground, Dublin, Ireland | 15 May 2019 |
| 2 | 3 | Soumya Sarkar | Sri Lanka | Ranasinghe Premadasa Stadium, Colombo, Sri Lanka | 26 July 2019 |
| 2 | 3 | Sabbir Rahman | Sri Lanka | Ranasinghe Premadasa Stadium, Colombo, Sri Lanka | 31 July 2019 |
| 2 | 3 | Liton Das | West Indies | Sher-e-Bangla National Cricket Stadium, Mirpur, Bangladesh | 20 January 2021 |
| 2 | 3 | Liton Das | New Zealand | Basin Reserve, Wellington, New Zealand | 26 March 2021 |
| 2 | 3 | Mehidy Hasan Miraz | Sri Lanka | Sher-e-Bangla National Cricket Stadium, Mirpur, Bangladesh | 23 May 2021 |
| 2 | 3 | Tamim Iqbal | Sri Lanka | Sher-e-Bangla National Cricket Stadium, Mirpur, Bangladesh | 25 May 2021 |
Last updated: 25 May 2021

=== Most catches in a series ===
The 2019 Cricket World Cup, which was won by England for the first time, saw the record set for the most catches taken by a non-wicket-keeper in an ODI series. Englishman batsman and captain of the England Test team Joe Root took 13 catches in the series as well as scored 556 runs. Soumya Sarkar with 7 catches in the same series is the leading Bangladeshi on this list.

| Rank | Catches | Player | Matches | Innings | Series |
|---|---|---|---|---|---|
| 1 | 7 | Soumya Sarkar | 8 | 8 | 2019 Cricket World Cup |
| 2 | 6 | Sabbir Rahman | 5 | 5 | 2017–18 Bangladesh Tri-Nation Series |
| 2 | 6 | Soumya Sarkar | 6 | 6 | 2015 Cricket World Cup |
| 2 | 6 | Aftab Ahmed | 9 | 9 | 2007 Cricket World Cup |
| 2 | 6 | Tamim Iqbal | 9 | 9 | 2007 Cricket World Cup |
Last updated: 14 March 2026

== All-round records ==
=== 1000 runs and 100 wickets ===
A total of 64 players have achieved the double of 1000 runs and 100 wickets in their ODI career.

| Rank | Player | Average difference | Period | Matches | Runs | Bat avg | Wickets | Bowl avg |
|---|---|---|---|---|---|---|---|---|
| 1 | Shakib Al Hasan† | 7.76 | 2006–2023 | 247 | 7,570 | 37.29 | 317 | 29.52 |
| 2 | Mehidy Hasan Miraz† | -10.91 | 2017–2024 | 100 | 1,447 | 24.11 | 109 | 35.02 |
| 3 | Mashrafe Mortaza | -18.80 | 2001–2020 | 218 | 1,773 | 13.85 | 269 | 32.65 |
| 4 | Mohammad Rafique | -25.23 | 1995–2007 | 123 | 1,190 | 13.52 | 119 | 38.75 |
Last updated: 14 November 2024

=== 250 runs and 5 wickets in a series ===
A total of 50 players on 103 occasions have achieved the double of 250 runs and 5 wickets in a series.

| Player | Matches | Runs | Wickets | Series |
|---|---|---|---|---|
| Shakib Al Hasan† | 8 | 606 | 11 | 2019 Cricket World Cup |
Last updated: 14 March 2026

== Other records ==
=== Most career matches ===
India's Sachin Tendulkar holds the record for the most ODI matches played with 463, with former captains Mahela Jayawardene and Sanath Jayasuriya being second and third having represented Sri Lanka on 443 and 441 occasions, respectively. Mushfiqur Rahim is the most experienced Bangladeshi player having represented the team on 272 occasions.

| Rank | Matches | Player | Runs | Wkts | Period |
|---|---|---|---|---|---|
| 1 | 274 | Mushfiqur Rahim | 7,795 | - | 2006–2025 |
| 2 | 247 | Shakib Al Hasan | 7,570 | 317 | 2006–2023 |
| 3 | 243 | Tamim Iqbal | 8,357 | - | 2007–2023 |
| 4 | 239 | Mahmudullah | 5,689 | 82 | 2007–2024 |
| 5 | 218 | Mashrafe Mortaza | 1,773 | 269 | 2001–2020 |
Last updated: 6 March 2025

=== Most consecutive career matches ===
Tendulkar also holds the record for the most consecutive ODI matches played with 185. He broke Richie Richardson's long standing record of 132 matches.

| Rank | Matches | Player | Period |
|---|---|---|---|
| 1 | 92 | Mushfiqur Rahim | 2010–2016 |
| 2 | 85 | Tamim Iqbal | 2007–2010 |
| 3 | 78 | Shakib Al Hasan | 2008–2012 |
| 4 | 74 | Abdur Razzak | 2006–2008 |
| 5 | 71 | Mohammad Ashraful | 2007–2010 |
Last updated: 14 November 2024

=== Most matches as captain ===
Ricky Ponting, who led the Australian cricket team from 2002 to 2012, holds the record for the most matches played as captain in ODIs with 230 (including 1 as captain of ICC World XI team). Mashrafe Mortaza has led Bangladesh in 88 matches.

| Rank | Matches | Player | Won | Lost | Tied | NR | Win % | Period |
|---|---|---|---|---|---|---|---|---|
| 1 | 88 | Mashrafe Mortaza | 50 | 36 | 0 | 2 | 58.13 | 2010–2020 |
| 2 | 69 | Habibul Bashar | 29 | 40 | 0 | 0 | 42.02 | 2004–2007 |
| 3 | 62 | Shakib Al Hasan | 27 | 34 | 0 | 1 | 43.54 | 2009–2023 |
| 4 | 38 | Mohammad Ashraful | 8 | 30 | 0 | 0 | 21.05 | 2007–2009 |
| 5 | 37 | Tamim Iqbal | 21 | 14 | 0 | 2 | 60.00 | 2019–2023 |
| 5 | 37 | Mushfiqur Rahim | 11 | 24 | 0 | 2 | 31.42 | 2011–2014 |
Last updated: 14 November 2024

=== Most matches won as a captain ===
| Rank | Won | Player | Matches | Lost | Tied | NR | Win % | Period |
|---|---|---|---|---|---|---|---|---|
| 1 | 50 | Mashrafe Mortaza | 88 | 36 | 0 | 2 | 58.13 | 2010–2020 |
| 2 | 29 | Habibul Bashar | 69 | 40 | 0 | 0 | 42.02 | 2004–2007 |
| 3 | 27 | Shakib Al Hasan | 62 | 34 | 0 | 1 | 44.26 | 2009–2023 |
| 4 | 21 | Tamim Iqbal | 37 | 14 | 0 | 2 | 60.00 | 2019–2023 |
| 5 | 11 | Mushfiqur Rahim | 37 | 24 | 0 | 2 | 31.42 | 2011–2014 |
Last updated: 14 November 2024

==== Most man of the match awards ====
| Rank | M.O.M. awards | Player | Matches | Period |
|---|---|---|---|---|
| 1 | 27 | Shakib Al Hasan | 247 | 2006–2023 |
| 2 | 16 | Tamim Iqbal | 243 | 2007–2023 |
| 3 | 12 | Mashrafe Mortaza | 218 | 2001–2020 |
| 4 | 10 | Mushfiqur Rahim | 274 | 2006–2025 |
| 5 | 8 | Mehidy Hasan Miraz† | 105 | 2017–2025 |
Last updated: 6 March 2025

==== Most man of the series awards ====
| Rank | M.O.S. awards | Player | Matches | Period |
|---|---|---|---|---|
| 1 | 7 | Shakib Al Hasan | 247 | 2006–2023 |
| 2 | 6 | Tamim Iqbal | 243 | 2007–2023 |
| 2 | 6 | Mushfiqur Rahim | 274 | 2006–2025 |
| 4 | 3 | Shahriar Nafees | 75 | 2005–2011 |
| 5 | 2 | Najmul Hossain Shanto† | 46 | 2018–2024 |
| 5 | 2 | Abdur Razzak | 153 | 2004–2014 |
| 5 | 2 | Mashrafe Mortaza | 218 | 2001–2020 |
Last updated: 6 March 2025

=== Youngest players on debut ===
The youngest player to play in an ODI match is claimed to be Hasan Raza at the age of 14 years and 233 days. Making his debut for Pakistan against Zimbabwe on 30 October 1996, there is some doubt as to the validity of Raza's age at the time. The youngest Bangladeshi to play ODIs was Mohammad Sharif who at the age of 15 years and 116 days debuted in the first ODI of the series against Zimbabwe in April 2001.

| Rank | Age | Player | Opposition | Venue | Date |
|---|---|---|---|---|---|
| 1 | 15 years and 116 days | Mohammad Sharif | Zimbabwe | Harare Sports Club, Harare, Zimbabwe | 7 April 2001 |
| 2 | 16 years and 278 days | Mohammad Ashraful | Zimbabwe | Harare Sports Club, Harare, Zimbabwe | 11 April 2001 |
| 3 | 16 years and 287 days | Talha Jubair | New Zealand | Sinhalese Sports Club Ground, Colombo, Sri Lanka | 23 September 2002 |
| 4 | 16 years and 343 days | Nazmul Hossain | South Africa | Edgbaston, Birmingham, England | 12 September 2004 |
| 5 | 17 years and 307 days | Hasibul Hossain | Sri Lanka | Sharjah Cricket Stadium, Sharjah, United Arab Emirates | 6 April 1995 |
Last updated: 1 July 2020

=== Oldest players on debut ===
The Netherlands batsmen Nolan Clarke is the oldest player to appear in an ODI match. Playing in the 1996 Cricket World Cup against New Zealand in 1996 at Reliance Stadium in Vadodara, Bangladesh he was aged 47 years and 240 days. Jahangir Shah is the oldest Bangladeshi ODI debutant when he played Bangladesh's first ever ODI during the 1986 Asia Cup at the Tyronne Fernando Stadium, Moratuwa, Sri Lanka.

| Rank | Age | Player | Opposition | Venue | Date |
|---|---|---|---|---|---|
| 1 | 36 years and 255 days | Jahangir Shah | Pakistan | Tyronne Fernando Stadium, Moratuwa, Sri Lanka | 31 March 1986 |
| 2 | 33 years and 89 days | Raqibul Hasan | Pakistan | Tyronne Fernando Stadium, Moratuwa, Sri Lanka | 31 March 1986 |
| 3 | 32 years and 216 days | Rony Talukdar | Ireland | County Cricket Ground, Chelmsford, England | 14 May 2023 |
| 4 | 32 years and 118 days | Samiur Rahman | Pakistan | Tyronne Fernando Stadium, Moratuwa, Sri Lanka | 31 March 1986 |
| 5 | 31 years and 3 days | Khaled Ahmed | New Zealand | Sher-e-Bangla National Cricket Stadium, Mirpur, Bangladesh | 23 September 2023 |
Last updated: 14 November 2024

=== Oldest players ===
The Netherlands batsmen Nolan Clarke is the oldest player to appear in an ODI match. Playing in the 1996 Cricket World Cup against South Africa in 1996 at Rawalpindi Cricket Stadium in Rawalpindi, Pakistan he was aged 47 years and 257 days.

| Rank | Age | Player | Opposition | Venue | Date |
|---|---|---|---|---|---|
| 1 | 40 years and 283 days | Jahangir Shah | New Zealand | Sharjah Cricket Stadium, Sharjah, UAE | 28 April 1990 |
| 2 | 39 years and 20 days | Mahmudullah | New Zealand | Rawalpindi Cricket Stadium, Rawalpindi, Pakistan | 24 February 2025 |
| 3 | 37 years and 291 days | Mushfiqur Rahim | New Zealand | Rawalpindi Cricket Stadium, Rawalpindi, Pakistan | 24 February 2025 |
| 4 | 36 years and 227 days | Shakib Al Hasan | Sri Lanka | Arun Jaitley Stadium, Delhi, India | 6 November 2023 |
| 5 | 36 years and 153 days | Mashrafe Mortaza | Zimbabwe | Sylhet International Cricket Stadium, Sylhet, Bangladesh | 6 March 2020 |
Last updated: 6 March 2025

== Partnership records ==
In cricket, two batsmen are always present at the crease batting together in a partnership. This partnership will continue until one of them is dismissed, retires or the innings comes to a close.

=== Highest partnerships by wicket ===
A wicket partnership describes the number of runs scored before each wicket falls. The first wicket partnership is between the opening batsmen and continues until the first wicket falls. The second wicket partnership then commences between the not out batsman and the number three batsman. This partnership continues until the second wicket falls. The third wicket partnership then commences between the not out batsman and the new batsman. This continues down to the tenth wicket partnership. When the tenth wicket has fallen, there is no batsman left to partner so the innings is closed.

| Wicket | Runs | First batsman | Second batsman | Opposition | Venue | Date | Scorecard |
|---|---|---|---|---|---|---|---|
| 1st wicket | 292 | Tamim Iqbal† | Litton Das† | Zimbabwe | Sylhet International Cricket Stadium, Sylhet, Bangladesh | 6 March 2020 | Scorecard |
| 2nd wicket | 220 | Imrul Kayes | Soumya Sarkar† | Zimbabwe | Bir Shrestho Flight Lieutenant Matiur Rahman Cricket Stadium, Chittagong, Bangladesh | 26 October 2018 | Scorecard |
| 3rd wicket | 202 | Litton Das† | Mushfiqur Rahim† | Afghanistan | Bir Shrestho Flight Lieutenant Matiur Rahman Cricket Stadium, Chittagong, Bangladesh | 25 February 2022 | Scorecard |
| 4th wicket | 189* | Shakib Al Hasan† | Litton Das† | West Indies | The Cooper Associates County Ground, Taunton, England | 17 June 2019 ‡ | Scorecard |
| 5th wicket | 224 | Shakib Al Hasan† | Mahmudullah† | New Zealand | SWALEC Stadium, Cardiff, England | 9 June 2017 | Scorecard |
| 6th wicket | 154 | Jaker Ali | Towhid Hridoy | India | Dubai International Cricket Stadium, Dubai, United Arab Emirates | 20 February 2025 | Scorecard |
| 7th wicket | 174* | Afif Hossain† | Mehidy Hasan† | Afghanistan | Bir Shrestho Flight Lieutenant Matiur Rahman Cricket Stadium, Chattogram, Bangladesh | 23 February 2022 | Scorecard |
| 8th wicket | 92 | Tanzim Hasan Sakib | Mahmudullah | West Indies | Warner Park, Bassterre, St. Kitts and Nevis | 13 February 2019 | Scorecard |
| 9th wicket | 97 | Shakib Al Hasan† | Mashrafe Mortaza† | Pakistan | Multan Cricket Stadium, Multan, Pakistan | 16 April 2008 | Scorecard |
| 10th wicket | 54* | Khaled Mashud | Tapash Baisya | Sri Lanka | Sinhalese Sports Club Ground, Colombo, Sri Lanka | 31 August 2005 | Scorecard |
Last updated: 23 February 2022

=== Highest partnerships by runs ===
The highest ODI partnership by runs for any wicket is held by the West Indian pairing of Chris Gayle and Marlon Samuels who put together a second wicket partnership of 372 runs during the 2015 Cricket World Cup against Zimbabwe in February 2015. This broke the record of 331 runs set by Indian pair of Sachin Tendulkar and Rahul Dravid against New Zealand in 1999

| Wicket | Runs | First batsman | Second batsman | Opposition | Venue | Date | Scorecard |
|---|---|---|---|---|---|---|---|
| 1st wicket | 292 | Tamim Iqbal † | Liton Das † | Zimbabwe | Sylhet International Cricket Stadium, Sylhet, Bangladesh | 6 March 2020 | Scorecard |
| 5th wicket | 224 | Mahmudullah † | Shakib Al Hasan | New Zealand | SWALEC Stadium, Cardiff, England | 9 June 2017 | Scorecard |
| 2nd wicket | 220 | Imrul Kayes | Soumya Sarkar † | Zimbabwe | Bir Shrestho Flight Lieutenant Matiur Rahman Cricket Stadium, Chittagong, Bangladesh | 26 October 2018 | Scorecard |
| 2nd wicket | 207 | Tamim Iqbal † | Shakib Al Hasan | West Indies | Providence Stadium, Providence, West Indies | 22 July 2018 | Scorecard |
| 4th wicket | 202 | Liton Das † | Mushfiqur Rahim † | Afghanistan | Bir Shrestho Flight Lieutenant Matiur Rahman Cricket Stadium, Chattogram, Bangladesh | 25 February 2022 ‡ | Scorecard |
Last updated: 25 February 2022

=== Highest overall partnership runs by a pair ===
| Rank | Runs | Innings | Players | Highest | Average | 100/50 | Career span |
|---|---|---|---|---|---|---|---|
| 1 | 3,545 | 97 | Mushfiqur Rahim & Shakib Al Hasan | 148 | 38.95 | 7/20 | 2007–2023 |
| 2 | 2,574 | 72 | Mushfiqur Rahim & Mahmudullah | 141 | 39.00 | 4/19 | 2008–2023 |
| 3 | 2,294 | 50 | Shakib Al Hasan & Tamim Iqbal | 207 | 47.79 | 3/17 | 2007–2023 |
| 4 | 2,008 | 50 | Mushfiqur Rahim & Tamim Iqbal† | 178 | 43.65 | 5/9 | 2007–2023 |
| 5 | 1,927 | 62 | Imrul Kayes & Tamim Iqbal | 147 | 31.08 | 2/10 | 2008–2018 |
An asterisk (*) signifies an unbroken partnership (i.e. neither of the batsmen was dismissed before either the end of the allotted overs or the required score being reached). Last updated: 14 November 2024

== Umpiring records ==
=== Most matches umpired ===
An umpire in cricket is a person who officiates the match according to the Laws of Cricket. Two umpires adjudicate the match on the field, whilst a third umpire has access to video replays, and a fourth umpire looks after the match balls and other duties. The records below are only for on-field umpires.

Rudi Koertzen of South Africa holds the record for the most ODI matches umpired with 209. The current active Aleem Dar is currently at 208 matches. They are followed by New Zealand's Billy Bowden who officiated in 200 matches. The most experienced Bangladeshi is Sharfuddoula Saikat who stood in 67 ODI matches.

| Rank | Matches | Umpire | Period |
|---|---|---|---|
| 1 | 72 | Sharfuddoula | 2010–2025 |
| 2 | 54 | Enamul Haque | 2006–2015 |
| 3 | 40 | Nadir Shah | 2006–2011 |
| 4 | 17 | Mahbubur Rahman | 2002–2006 |
| 5 | 16 | A. F. M. Akhtaruddin | 2001–2006 |
Last updated: 13 March 2026

== See also ==
- List of One Day International cricket records
- List of Bangladesh Test cricket records
- List of Bangladesh Twenty20 International cricket records
