= Bangladeshi cricket team in Zimbabwe in 2006 =

The Bangladeshi cricket team toured Zimbabwe from July 29 to August 6, 2006. The tour included only five One Day Internationals, as Zimbabwe have voluntarily withdrawn from Test cricket.

Zimbabwe changed captains before this series, sacking Terry Duffin and replacing him with Prosper Utseya. Utseya began his tenure with a last-over victory. Stuart Matsikenyeri, playing his first international since March 2005, was Man of the Match after hitting his highest ODI score with 89, including a stand of 116 for the sixth wicket with Elton Chigumbura, who made 70 not out and scored the winning runs. Matsikenyeri top-scored again in the second ODI, but this time Bangladesh prevailed, winning by 62 runs after bowling Zimbabwe out for 176.

During the second match of the series, Bangladesh captain Habibul Bashar broke a finger attempting to hold a catch, and was ruled out of the tour. Wicketkeeper Khaled Mashud captained the side in the following two matches, which they both lost; the third ODI of the series was lost on the last ball when Brendan Taylor hit Mashrafe Mortaza for six, and the fourth was lost by seven wickets after spinners Hamilton Masakadza, Prosper Utseya and Stuart Matsikenyeri had been credited with 79 runs against in their 25 overs. The seamers got taken for 122, but Bangladesh' total was 206 for eight (including four byes and a leg-bye) which was chased down with seven wickets to spare, Greg Strydom making a run-a-ball 58 from No. 3. Zimbabwe thus clinched the series with a game remaining, but lost the final match by eight wickets after 118 not out from Shahriar Nafees. This was also Khaled Mashud's first win in 27 One-day Internationals as captain.

== One Day Internationals (ODIs) ==
Zimbabwe won the series 3–2.

=== 1st ODI ===
29 July 2006
Scorecard

Bangladesh; 246/7 (50 overs)	v	Zimbabwe; 248/8 (49.1 overs)
Shahriar Nafees 78 (116); T Mupariwa 4/61 (10 overs)		S Matsikenyeri 89 (90); Mashrafe Mortaza 4/41 (10 overs)

Zimbabwe won by 2 wickets
Harare Sports Club, Harare
Umpires: KC Barbour (ZIM) and IL Howell (SA)
Player of the match: S Matsikenyeri (ZIM)

- Zimbabwe won the toss and elected to field.

=== 2nd ODI ===
30 July 2006
Scorecard

Bangladesh; 238/8 (50 overs)	v	Zimbabwe; 176 (44.4 overs)
Farhad Reza 50 (57); NB Mahwire 3/29 (8 overs)		S Matsikenyeri 46 (56); Shahadat Hossain 3/41 (7.4 overs)

Bangladesh won by 62 runs
Harare Sports Club, Harare
Umpires: IL Howell (SA) and RB Tiffin (ZIM)
Player of the match: Mohammad Rafique (BAN)

- Zimbabwe won the toss and elected to field.
- Farhad Reza (BAN) made his ODI debut

=== 3rd ODI ===
2 August 2006
Scorecard

Bangladesh; 236 (49 overs)	v	Zimbabwe; 238/8 (50 overs)
Rajin Saleh 54 (90); H Masakadza 3/39 (8 overs)		BRM Taylor 79* (72); Shahadat Hossain 3/52 (10 overs)

Zimbabwe won by 2 wickets
Harare Sports Club, Harare
Umpires: KC Barbour (ZIM) and IL Howell (SA)
Player of the match: BRM Taylor (ZIM)

- Zimbabwe won the toss and elected to field.
- TV Mufambisi (ZIM) made his ODI debut

=== 4th ODI ===
4 August 2006
Scorecard

Bangladesh; 206/9 (50 overs)	v	Zimbabwe; 212/3 (41.4 overs)
Shahriar Nafees 45 (92); P Utseya 2/25 (10 overs)		GM Strydom 58 (58); Farhad Reza 1/19 (4 overs)

Zimbabwe won by 7 wickets
Harare Sports Club, Harare
Umpires: IL Howell (SA) and RB Tiffin (ZIM)
Player of the match: P Utseya (ZIM)

- Bangladesh won the toss and elected to bat.

=== 5th ODI ===
6 August 2006
Scorecard

Zimbabwe; 197 (49.3 overs)	v	Bangladesh; 201/2 (44.4 overs)
H Masakadza 75 (101); Rajin Saleh 4/16 (4.3 overs)		Shahriar Nafees 118* (148); P Utseya 2/31 (10 overs)

Bangladesh won by 8 wickets
Harare Sports Club, Harare
Umpires: KC Barbour (ZIM) and IL Howell (SA)
Player of the match: Shahriar Nafees (BAN)

- Zimbabwe won the toss and elected to bat.
- Shakib Al Hasan and Mushfiqur Rahim (both BAN) made their ODI debuts
