= Scottish cricket team in Bangladesh in 2006–07 =

- Date: 15–17 December 2006
- Location: Bangladesh
- Result: Bangladesh won the 2-ODI series 2-0
- Player of the series: Aftab Ahmed (Ban)
Teams
- Bangladesh: Scotland
Captains
- Habibul Bashar: Craig Wright
Most runs
- Aftab Ahmed (118) Shakib Al Hasan (64) Shahriar Nafees (60): Fraser Watts (47); Gavin Hamilton (41); Glenn Rogers (40)
Most wickets
- Abdur Razzak (6) Shahadat Hossain (4) Mashrafe Mortaza (4): Ross Lyons (2); Majid Haq (2); Glenn Rogers (2)

The Scotland national cricket team toured Bangladesh for a tour match and two ODI matches in December 2006. They lost all three matches.

== Dates ==
Date	Match	Venue
14 December	Tour match	Chittagong
15 December	1st ODI	Chittagong
17 December	2nd ODI	Mirpur

== Squads ==
Bangladesh	Scotland
Habibul Bashar (c); Nadif Chowdhury; Abdur Razzak; Aftab Ahmed; Shakib Al Hasan; Mehrab Hossain Jnr; Mashrafe Mortaza; Mohammad Ashraful; Mohammad Rafique; Farhad Reza; Shahadat Hossain; Shahriar Nafees; Syed Rasel; Mushfiqur Rahim (wk)	Craig Wright (c); Colin Smith (wk); Omer Hussain; Majid Haq; Dougie Brown; Fraser Watts; Ross Lyons; Navdeep Poonia; Neil McCallum; Gavin Hamilton; Douglas Lockhart; Paul Hoffmann; Ryan Watson; John Blain; Glenn Rogers; Dewald Nel*

* Dewald Nel was picked for the team but withdrew before the tour started.

== ODI matches ==
=== Tour match ===
14 December 2006
Scorecard

Bangladesh Cricket Board Academy; 252/6 (50 overs)	v	Scotland; 219 (47.2 overs)
TK Iqbal 105 (134); RM Haq 3/35 (7 overs)		NS Poonia 63 (73); MO Hussain 4/32 (9.2 overs)

Bangladesh Cricket Board Academy won by 33 runs
Chittagong Divisional Stadium, Chittagong
Umpires: E Haque (Ban) and KZM Islam (Ban)

- Bangladesh Cricket Board Academy won the toss and elected to bat.
- Bangladesh Cricket Board Academy used 12 players and Scotland used 13 players during the match, 11 per innings.

=== ODI series ===
==== 1st ODI ====
15 December 2006
Scorecard

Scotland; 153 (45.1 overs)	v	Bangladesh; 154/4 (29.1 overs)
CJO Smith 30 (59); KS Hossain 3/38 (8 overs)		AC Ahmed 66 (50); RT Lyons 2/52 (6.1 overs)

Bangladesh won by 6 wickets
Chittagong Divisional Stadium, Chittagong
Umpires: E Haque (Ban) and MN Ghauri (Pak)
Player of the match: S Hasan (Ban)

- Bangladesh won the toss and elected to field.
- GA Rogers (Sco) made his ODI and List A debut.

==== 2nd ODI ====
17 December 2006
Scorecard

Bangladesh; 278/6 (50 overs)	v	Scotland; 132 (41.3 overs)
AC Ahmed 52 (46); CM Wright 2/46 (10 overs)		DF Watts 29 (37); A Razzak 4/23 (10 overs)

Bangladesh won by 146 runs
Sher-e-Bangla Cricket Stadium, Dhaka
Umpires: MN Ghauri (Pak) and N Shah (Ban)
Player of the match: MB Mortaza (Ban)

- Scotland won the toss and elected to field.
- RM Haq (Sco) made his ODI debut.
