= Kenyan cricket team in Bangladesh in 2005–06 =

	Bangladesh	Kenya
- Dates: 17 March 2006 – 25 March 2006
Captains	Habibul Bashar	Steve Tikolo

One Day International series
- Results: Bangladesh won the 4-match series 4–0
Most runs	Shahriar Nafees (196)	Tanmay Mishra (124)
Most wickets	Mohammad Rafique (10)	Peter Ongondo (7)
- Player of the series: Shahriar Nafees (Ban)

The Kenya national cricket team toured Bangladesh in March 2006 to play a Four-match ODI series which Bangladesh won 4–0. Kenya were captained by Steve Tikolo and Bangladesh by Habibul Bashar.

== ODI series ==
=== 1st ODI ===
17 March 2006
Scorecard

Bangladesh; 301/7 (50 overs)	v	Kenya; 170 (48.1 overs)
Shahriar Nafees 91 (112); Peter Ongondo 2/73 (10 overs)		Tanmay Mishra 43 (82); Syed Rasel 3/31 (8 overs)

Bangladesh won by 131 runs
Shaheed Chandu Stadium, Bogra
Umpires: Nadeem Ghauri (Pak) and Nadir Shah (Ban)
Player of the match: Shahriar Nafees (Ban)

- Bangladesh won the toss and elected to bat.
- Shahadat Hossain (Ban) made his ODI debut.

=== 2nd ODI ===
20 March 2006
Scorecard

Kenya; 161 (49.5 overs)	v	Bangladesh; 162/1 (23.5 overs)
Tanmay Mishra 33 (50); Syed Rasel 3/28 (10 overs)		Javed Omar 64* (78); Peter Ongondo 1/17 (3 overs)

Bangladesh won by 9 wickets
Sheikh Abu Naser Stadium, Khulna
Umpires: Mahbubur Rahman (Ban) and Nadeem Ghauri (Pak)
Player of the match: Syed Rasel (Ban)

- Kenya won the toss and elected to bat.
- Kalpesh Patel (Ken) made his ODI debut.

=== 3rd ODI ===
23 March 2006
Scorecard

Bangladesh; 231 (45.5 overs)	v	Kenya; 211 (49.2 overs)
Shahriar Nafees 57 (89); Steve Tikolo 3/32 (8.5 overs)		Tanmay Mishra 48 (59); Mohammad Rafique 5/47 (10 overs)

Bangladesh won by 20 runs
Khan Shaheb Osman Ali Stadium, Fatullah
Umpires: A. F. M. Akhtaruddin (Ban) and Nadeem Ghauri (Pak)
Player of the match: Mohammad Rafique (Ban)

- Bangladesh won the toss and elected to bat.

=== 4th ODI ===
25 March 2006
Scorecard

Kenya; 232/9 (50 overs)	v	Bangladesh; 237/3 (41.3 overs)
Steve Tikolo 81 (87); Mashrafe Mortaza 2/38 (10 overs)		Rajin Saleh 108* (113); Peter Ongondo 1/20 (6 overs)

Bangladesh won by 7 wickets
Khan Shaheb Osman Ali Stadium, Fatullah
Umpires: Nadeem Ghauri (Pak) and Nadir Shah (Ban)
Player of the match: Rajin Saleh (Ban)

- Kenya won the toss and elected to bat.

== Venues ==
Bogra	Fatullah	Khulna
Shaheed Chandu Stadium	Khan Shaheb Osman Ali Stadium	Sheikh Abu Naser Stadium
Capacity: 18,000	Capacity: 25,000	Capacity: 15,600
Kenyan cricket team in Bangladesh in 2005–06 is located in Bangladesh
