= 2018 Asia Cup final =

Cricket tournament in United Arab Emirates

2018 Asia Cup Final
- Event: 2018 Asia Cup
Bangladesh	India
(Bangladesh)	(India)
222	223/7
48.3 overs	50 overs
- India won by 3 wickets
- Date: 28 September 2018
- Venue: Dubai International Cricket Stadium, Dubai
- Player of the match: Liton Das (Ban)
- Umpires: Marais Erasmus (SA) and Ruchira Palliyaguruge (SL)
- Attendance: 24,000+

The 2018 Asia Cup Final was the final of the 2018 Asia Cup, a One Day International cricket tournament, and was played between India and Bangladesh on 28 September 2018 in Dubai. India were the defending champions, and retained their title by beating Bangladesh by three wickets in the final over.

== Background ==
The 2018 Asia Cup started on 15 September 2018 and was hosted by United Arab Emirates across 2 venues. Five full member national teams and an associate team from the qualifier were split into two groups of three. The top two teams from each of the groups progressed to the Super Four section of the tournament. From there, the top two teams of the Super Four section played each other in the final. Initially, the team that finishes second in Group A were scheduled to play their first Super Four game in Abu Dhabi. However, BCCI later announced that India would be based in Dubai, irrespective of their standing in Super Four.

== Road to the final ==
India
Titles
Bangladesh
Opponent
Result
Group Stage
Opponent
Result
Hong Kong
Won
Match 1
Sri Lanka
Won
Pakistan
Won
Match 2
Afghanistan
Lost
Group A table

Pos	Team	Pld	Pts
1	India	2	4
2	Pakistan	2	2
3	Hong Kong	2	0

Source: ESPNCricinfo
Final standings
Group B table

Pos	Team	Pld	Pts
1	Afghanistan	2	4
2	Bangladesh	2	2
3	Sri Lanka	2	0

Source: ESPNCricinfo
Opponent
Result
Super Four
Opponent
Result
Bangladesh
Won
Match 1
India
Lost
Pakistan
Won
Match 2
Afghanistan
Won
Afghanistan
Tied
Match 3
Pakistan
Won
Super Four Table

Pos	Team	Pld	W	L	T	NR	Pts	NRR
1	India	3	2	0	1	0	5	0.863
2	Bangladesh	3	2	1	0	0	4	−0.156
3	Pakistan	3	1	2	0	0	2	−0.599
4	Afghanistan	3	0	2	1	0	1	−0.044

Source: ESPNCricinfo

=== India ===
In the second match of group A, India beat Hong Kong by 26 runs, with Khaleel Ahmed making his debut for India in the match. Shikhar Dhawan's 14th ODI century carried India to 285 for 7, with Hong Kong's bowlers negating a powerful start to allow only 48 runs in the last 10 overs. They carried that momentum with them when they came out to bat, with openers Nizakat Khan and Anshuman Rath putting on a 174-run partnership, the highest for Hong Kong in ODIs. On 19 September 2018, India faced rivals Pakistan and followed the close match against Hong Kong to with a much improved bowling performance and registered their most comfortable chase against Pakistan, winning with 126 balls remaining. India had won two ODIs on consecutive days and headed to the Super Four stage as leaders of the group. In the first match of Super Four, India beat Bangladesh by 7 wickets, with Rohit Sharma's unbeaten 83 from 104 balls the major contribution in India successfully chasing the total of 173. In the next match India faced Pakistan again and openers Rohit Sharma and Shikhar Dhawan starred with the bat as India defeated their rivals Pakistan by nine-wickets and qualified for the final. Sharma, the Indian skipper, scored his 19th ODI century, while Dhawan scored his 15th and their partnership of 210 was India's highest while batting second against Pakistan and in their highest for the first wicket in Asia Cup history. In the process, Sharma scored his 7,000th run in ODI cricket. On 25 September 2018, India faced Afghanistan in their final game of the Super Four stage. Left needing seven runs off the final over, with one wicket in hand, India scored six runs off first four balls to level the scores, but with the fifth, Rashid Khan got the better of Ravindra Jadeja to bowl India out for 252, leaving the match tied. This was the first tie in the history of the Asia Cup and the first tied ODI featuring Afghanistan.

=== Bangladesh ===
On 15 September 2018, Bangladesh produced an all-round performance to defeat Sri Lanka by 137 runs in the first match in the group B of the Asia Cup, recording their biggest win in the history of Asia Cup. In the next match they were bowled out for just 119 runs to suffer 136 run defeat to Afghanistan, but still qualified to the Super Four stage. They faced India in the Super Four on September 21, when they only made 173 runs and lost by 7 wickets. On 23 September, Bangladesh beat Afghanistan by 3 runs in their second Super Four match and kept their chances of qualifying for the finals in their own hands. Chasing 250 to win, Afghanistan needed 8 runs off the last over, but Mustafizur Rahman restricted them to just 4 to help his team win. On 25 September, Bangladesh beat Pakistan by 37 runs to confirm their berth in the Asia Cup 2018 final against India. This was Bangladesh's first win against Pakistan at the Asia Cup.

== Match ==
=== Bangladesh innings ===
Mehedi Hasan opened the innings with Liton Das, the first time he had done so in ODIs. Their opening stand of 120 was Bangladesh's highest since 31 December 2016, when Imrul Kayes and Tamim Iqbal put on 102 runs against New Zealand. With the fifth ball of the 21st over, Kedar Jadhav took the wicket of Mehedi for 32, followed by that of Mushfiqur Rahim six overs later, either side of Chahal trapping Kayes LBW in the 24th over. Das brought up his maiden ODI century in the 29th over, having faced 87 balls. In the 33rd over, Kuldeep Yadav took his first wicket in the match to dismiss Mahmudullah, later also dismissing Das and Mashrafe Mortaza, both stumped by MS Dhoni. Soumya Sarkar provided some resistance in the end to drag Bangladesh beyond the 200-run mark as they managed to make 222 all out with nine balls left. Yadav finished the innings with figures of 3/45 and Jadhav 2/41 to help India regain control. Das was the top-scorer with 121 off 117 balls.

=== Indian innings ===
The Indian team did not start well, losing the wickets of Shikhar Dhawan and Ambati Rayudu in the first eight overs. Rohit Sharma, with a score of 48, and Dinesh Karthik, with 37, steadied the run chase for India in the middle overs. After the departure of Rohit, Karthik built a 54-run partnership with MS Dhoni, before the Bangladesh bowlers dismissed them both to put India back under pressure. Ravindra Jadeja and Bhuvneshwar Kumar then put together a 45-run partnership for the seventh wicket to take India close to their target. Kedar Jadhav, who had retired hurt after suffering a hamstring injury, returned in the penultimate over and took India across the line on the final ball of the match.

=== Match officials and result ===
- On-field umpires: Marais Erasmus (SA) and Ruchira Palliyaguruge (SL)
- Third umpire: Rod Tucker (Aus)
- Reserve umpire: Ahsan Raza (Pak)
- Match referee: David Boon (Aus)
- Toss: India won the toss and elected to field.

=== Scorecard ===
1st innings

Bangladesh batting
Player	Status	Runs	Balls	4s	6s	Strike rate
Liton Das	st Dhoni b Yadav	121	117	12	2	103.41
Mehedi Hasan	c Rayudu b Jadhav	32	59	3	0	54.23
Imrul Kayes	lbw b Chahal	2	12	0	0	16.66
Mushfiqur Rahim	c Bumrah b Jadhav	5	9	1	0	55.55
Mohammad Mithun	run out (Jadeja/ Yadav)	2	4	0	0	50.00
Mahmudullah	c Bumrah b Yadav	4	16	0	0	25.00
Soumya Sarkar	run out (Rayudu)	33	45	1	1	73.33
Mashrafe Mortaza	st Dhoni b Yadav	7	9	0	1	77.77
Nazmul Islam	run out (sub Pandey)	7	13	0	0	53.84
Mustafizur Rahman	not out	2	5	0	0	40.00
Rubel Hossain	b Bumrah	0	2	0	0	0.00
Total	48.3 overs	222	291	17	4	4.58(run rate)

Fall of wickets: 1-120 (Mehedi, 20.5 overs), 2-128 (Kayes, 23.5 overs), 3-137 (Rahim, 26.5 overs), 4-139 (Mithun, 28 overs), 5-151 (Mahmudullah, 32.2 overs), 6-188 (Das, 41 overs), 7-196 (Mortaza, 42.5 overs), 8-213 (Nazmul, 46.4 overs), 9-222 (Sarkar 48.1 overs), 10-222 (Rubel 48.3 overs)

India bowling
Bowler	Overs	Maidens	Runs	Wickets	Econ	Wides	NBs
Bhuvneshwar Kumar	7	0	33	0	4.71	{{{wides}}}	{{{no-balls}}}
Jasprit Bumrah	8.3	0	39	1	4.58	{{{wides}}}	{{{no-balls}}}
Yuzvendra Chahal	8	1	31	1	3.87	{{{wides}}}	{{{no-balls}}}
Kuldeep Yadav	10	0	45	3	4.50	{{{wides}}}	{{{no-balls}}}
Ravindra Jadeja	6	0	31	0	5.16	{{{wides}}}	{{{no-balls}}}
Kedar Jadhav	9	0	41	2	4.55	{{{wides}}}	{{{no-balls}}}

2nd innings

India batting
Player	Status	Runs	Balls	4s	6s	Strike rate
Rohit Sharma	c Nazmul b Rubel	48	55	3	3	87.27
Shikhar Dhawan	c Sarkar b Nazmul	15	14	3	0	107.14
Ambati Rayudu	c Rahim b Mortaza	2	7	0	0	28.57
Dinesh Karthik	lbw b Mahmudullah	37	61	1	1	60.65
MS Dhoni	c Rahim b Mustafizur	36	67	3	0	53.73
Kedar Jadhav	not out	23	27	1	1	88.88
Ravindra Jadeja	c Rahim b Rubel	23	33	1	0	69.69
Bhuvneshwar Kumar	c Rahim b Mustafizur	21	31	1	1	67.74
Kuldeep Yadav	not out	5	5	0	0	100.00
Jasprit Bumrah	Did not bat					
Yuzvendra Chahal	Did not bat					
Total	50 overs	223	300	13	6	4.46 (Run Rate)

Fall of wickets: 1-35 (Dhawan, 4.4 overs), 2-46 (Rayudu, 7.3 overs), 3-83 (Sharma, 16.4 overs), 4-137 (Karthik, 30.4 overs), 5-160 (Dhoni, 36.1 overs), 6-212 (Jadeja, 47.2 overs), 7-214 (Kumar, 48.1 overs)

Bangladesh bowling
Bowler	Overs	Maidens	Runs	Wickets	Econ	Wides	NBs
Mehedi Hasan	4	0	27	0	6.75	{{{wides}}}	{{{no-balls}}}
Mustafizur Rahman	10	0	38	2	3.80	{{{wides}}}	{{{no-balls}}}
Nazmul Islam	10	0	56	1	5.60	{{{wides}}}	{{{no-balls}}}
Mashrafe Mortaza	10	0	35	1	3.50	{{{wides}}}	{{{no-balls}}}
Rubel Hossain	10	2	26	2	2.60	{{{wides}}}	{{{no-balls}}}
Mahmudullah	6	0	33	1	5.50	{{{wides}}}	{{{no-balls}}}
