= Afghan cricket team in Bangladesh in 2016–17 =

International cricket tour

	Bangladesh	Afghanistan
- Dates: 23 September – 1 October 2016
Captains	Mashrafe Mortaza	Asghar Stanikzai

One Day International series
- Results: Bangladesh won the 3-match series 2–1
Most runs	Tamim Iqbal (218)	Rahmat Shah (107)
Most wickets	Taskin Ahmed (7)	Rashid Khan (7)
- Player of the series: Tamim Iqbal (Ban)

The Afghanistan cricket team toured Bangladesh in September and October 2016 to play three One Day Internationals (ODIs) matches. This was Afghanistan's first full series against a Test-playing side other than Zimbabwe and was the first bilateral series between the two sides. It was also Bangladesh's first home bilateral ODI series against an Associate Nation since Ireland toured in 2008. Ahead of the ODI series there was a fifty-over warm-up game between the Bangladesh Cricket Board XI and Afghanistan in Fatullah.

Afghanistan won the warm-up match by 66 runs and Bangladesh won the ODI series 2–1. This was Bangladesh's sixth consecutive series victory in ODIs.

== Squads ==
Bangladesh	Afghanistan
Mashrafe Mortaza (c); Taskin Ahmed; Shakib Al Hasan; Mosaddek Hossain; Mosharraf Hossain; Nasir Hossain; Rubel Hossain; Tamim Iqbal; Taijul Islam; Shafiul Islam; Imrul Kayes; Mahmudullah; Mushfiqur Rahim; Sabbir Rahman; Soumya Sarkar	Asghar Stanikzai (c); Fareed Ahmad; Mirwais Ashraf; Amir Hamza; Ihsanullah; Karim Janat; Rashid Khan; Nawroz Mangal; Mohammad Nabi; Shabir Noori; Rahmat Shah; Hashmatullah Shaidi; Mohammad Shahzad; Samiullah Shinwari; Naveen-ul-Haq; Dawlat Zadran; Najibullah Zadran

Taskin Ahmed was added to Bangladesh's squad after his bowling action was cleared by the International Cricket Council (ICC). Mosharraf Hossain was added to the squad for the third ODI after Rubel Hossain was dropped.

== Tour match ==
=== One-day:Bangladesh Cricket Board XI vs Afghanistan ===
23 September 2016
Scorecard

Afghanistan; 233 (49.2 overs)	v	Bangladesh Cricket Board XI; 167 (38.1 overs)
Hashmatullah Shahidi 69 (96); Alauddin Babu 3/32 (8.2 overs)		Mosaddek Hossain 76 (97); Mohammad Nabi 4/24 (8 overs)

Afghanistan won by 66 runs
Khan Shaheb Osman Ali Stadium, Fatullah
Umpires: Anisur Rahman (Ban) and Sharfuddoula (Ban)

- Bangladesh Cricket Board XI won the toss and elected to field.
- 17 players per side (11 batting, 11 fielding).

== ODI series ==
=== 1st ODI ===
25 September 2016 (D/N)
Scorecard

Bangladesh; 265 (50 overs)	v	Afghanistan; 258 (50 overs)
Tamim Iqbal 80 (98); Dawlat Zadran 4/73 (10 overs)		Hashmatullah Shahidi 72 (110); Taskin Ahmed 4/59 (8 overs)

Bangladesh won by 7 runs
Sher-e-Bangla National Cricket Stadium, Mirpur
Umpires: Chettithody Shamshuddin (Ind) and Sharfuddoula (Ban)
Player of the match: Shakib Al Hasan (Ban)

- Bangladesh won the toss and elected to bat.
- Naveen-ul-Haq (Afg) made his ODI debut.
- Shakib Al Hasan became the leading wicket-taker for Bangladesh in ODIs.

=== 2nd ODI ===
28 September 2016 (D/N)
Scorecard

Bangladesh; 208 (49.2 overs)	v	Afghanistan; 212/8 (49.4 overs)
Mosaddek Hossain 45* (45); Rashid Khan 3/35 (10 overs)		Asghar Stanikzai 57 (95); Shakib Al Hasan 4/47 (10 overs)

Afghanistan won by 2 wickets
Sher-e-Bangla National Cricket Stadium, Mirpur
Umpires: Anisur Rahman (Ban) and Chettithody Shamshuddin (Ind)
Player of the match: Mohammad Nabi (Afg)

- Afghanistan won the toss and elected to field.
- Mosaddek Hossain (Ban) made his ODI debut.
- Mosaddek Hossain became the first player for Bangladesh to take a wicket with his very first delivery in an ODI.

=== 3rd ODI ===
1 October 2016 (D/N)
Scorecard

Bangladesh; 279/8 (50 overs)	v	Afghanistan; 138 (33.5 overs)
Tamim Iqbal 118 (118); Rashid Khan 2/39 (10 overs)		Rahmat Shah 36 (73); Mosharraf Hossain 3/24 (8 overs)

Bangladesh won by 141 runs
Sher-e-Bangla National Cricket Stadium, Mirpur
Umpires: Chettithody Shamshuddin (Ind) and Sharfuddoula (Ban)
Player of the match: Tamim Iqbal (Ban)

- Bangladesh won the toss and elected to bat.
- Tamim Iqbal (Ban) scored his seventh century in an ODI.
- This was Bangladesh's 100th win in ODIs.
