= Zimbabwean cricket team in Bangladesh in 2009–10 =

International cricket tour

Zimbabwe cricket team in Bangladesh in 2009
	Zimbabwe	Bangladesh
- Dates: October 27 – November 5, 2009
Captains	Prosper Utseya(first ODI); Hamilton Masakadza	Shakib Al Hasan

One Day International series
- Results: Bangladesh won the 5-match series 4–1
Most runs	Brendan Taylor 141	Shakib Al Hasan 143
Most wickets	Abdur Razzak 15	Graeme Cremer 6
- Player of the series: Abdur Razzak

The Zimbabwe Cricket Team toured Bangladesh from October 27 to November 5, 2009. The tour consisted of 5 one day internationals. The hosts won the series 4–1.

== Squads ==
No Squads were announced.

== ODI series ==
=== 1st ODI ===
27 October
Scorecard

Bangladesh; 186 (46.5 overs)	v	Zimbabwe; 189/5 (34.4 overs)
Mushfiqur Rahim 56 (77); Elton Chigumbura 3/27 (8 overs)		Elton Chigumbura 60* (50); Abdur Razzak 3/36 (8.4 overs)

Zimbabwe won by 5 wickets
Shere Bangla National Stadium, Mirpur, Bangladesh
Umpires: Aleem Dar (PAK) & Nadir Shah (BAN)
Player of the match: Elton Chigumbura

=== 2nd ODI ===
29 October
Scorecard

Zimbabwe; 219 (47.2 overs)	v	Bangladesh; 221/3 (29.3 overs)
Malcolm Waller 40 (39); Abdur Razzak 5/29 (9.2 overs)		Shakib Al Hasan 105* (69); Elton Chigumbura 2/47 (9 overs)

Bangladesh won by 7 wickets
Shere Bangla National Stadium, Mirpur, Bangladesh
Umpires: Aleem Dar (PAK) & Enamul Haque (BAN)
Player of the match: Abdur Razzak

=== 3rd ODI ===
31 October
Scorecard

Zimbabwe; 196 (41.1 overs)	v	Bangladesh; 198/6 (40.4 overs)
Hamilton Masakadza 84 (79); Nazmul Hossain 3/13 (4.1 overs)		Tamim Iqbal 80 (72); Kyle Jarvis 3/38 (10 overs)

Bangladesh won by 4 wickets
Shere Bangla National Stadium, Mirpur, Bangladesh
Umpires: Aleem Dar (PAK) & Nadir Shah (BAN)
Player of the match: Tamim Iqbal

=== 4th ODI ===
3 November
Scorecard

Zimbabwe; 44 (24.5 overs)	v	Bangladesh; 49/4 (11.5 overs)
Malcolm Waller 13 (36); Shakib Al Hasan 3/8 (6.5 overs)		Tamim Iqbal 22 (26); Ray Price 2/5 (4 overs)

Bangladesh won by 6 wickets
Zohur Ahmed Chowdhury Stadium, Chittagong
Umpires: Aleem Dar (PAK) & Nadir Shah (BAN)
Player of the match: Nazmul Hossain

- Zimbabwe's innings score of 44 in the first innings is fifth lowest in all One Day Internationals.

=== 5th ODI ===
5 November
Scorecard

Zimbabwe; 221/9 (50 overs)	v	Bangladesh; 222/9 (49 overs)
Brendan Taylor 118 (125); Shakib Al Hasan 3/29 (10 overs)		Naeem Islam 73* (90); Stuart Matsikenyeri 2/25 (5 overs)

Bangladesh won by 1 wicket
Zohur Ahmed Chowdhury Stadium, Chittagong
Umpires: Aleem Dar (PAK) & Enamul Haque (BAN)
Player of the match: Naeem Islam

- Brendan Taylor scored his first ODI century

== Media coverage ==
Television

- Bangladesh Television - Bangladesh
- Supersport (live) – South Africa, Kenya, Zimbabwe and Pakistan.
- Neo Sports (live) – India and Middle East
