= Bangladeshi cricket team in Kenya in 2006 =

The Bangladeshi national cricket team toured Kenya in August 2006. They played 3 One Day Internationals (ODIs). Bangladesh won the series 3–0.

Bangladesh were originally scheduled to play three ODIs against the Kenyan side between 19 July and 23 July. However, the Kenyan board had to postpone the matches for three weeks due to lack of funds.

== ODI series ==
=== 1st ODI ===
12 August 2006
Scorecard

Kenya; 168 (49.1 overs)	v	Bangladesh; 170/4 (30.1 overs)
SO Tikolo 47 (48); Mashrafe Mortaza 3/25 (10 overs)		Mohammad Ashraful 67* (43); TM Odoyo 1/23 (6 overs)

Bangladesh won by 6 wickets
Gymkhana Club Ground, Nairobi
Umpires: K Hariharan (IND) and SR Modi (KEN)
Player of the match: Mashrafe Mortaza (BAN)

- Bangladesh won the toss and elected to field

=== 2nd ODI ===
13 August 2006
Scorecard

Kenya; 184 (46.3 overs)	v	Bangladesh; 185/8 (46 overs)
TM Odoyo 84 (97); Syed Rasel 4/22 (10 overs)		Mashrafe Mortaza 43* (53); TM Odoyo 4/36 (10 overs)

Bangladesh won by 2 wickets
Gymkhana Club Ground, Nairobi
Umpires: K Hariharan (IND) and SR Modi (KEN)
Player of the match: Mashrafe Mortaza (BAN)

- Kenya won the toss and elected to bat

=== 3rd ODI ===
15 August 2006
Scorecard

Kenya; 118 (41.2 overs)	v	Bangladesh; 120/4 (27 overs)
TM Odoyo 29 (59); Mashrafe Mortaza 6/26 (10 overs)		Farhad Reza 41* (48); PJ Ongondo 2/37 (10 overs)

Bangladesh won by 6 wickets
Gymkhana Club Ground, Nairobi
Umpires: K Hariharan (IND) and SR Modi (KEN)
Player of the match: Mashrafe Mortaza (BAN)

- Bangladesh won the toss and elected to field
