= Tafadzwa Mufambisi =

Zimbabwean cricketer (born 1986)

Cricket information
- Batting: Right-handed

Career statistics
Competition	ODI
Matches	6
Runs scored	55
Batting average	9.16
100s/50s	0/0
Top score	21
Catches/stumpings	1/–
- Source: Cricinfo, 21 April 2007

Tafadzwa Vintlane Mufambisi is a Zimbabwean cricketer born 17 December 1986, in Glen View who plays ODI cricket for Zimbabwe. He has previously represented Zimbabwe Under-19s and is a right-hand batsman and wicket-keeper.
