= Nadeem Ghauri =

Pakistani cricketer

Personal information
- Full name: Mohammad Nadeem Ghauri
- Born: 12 October 1962 (age 64); Lahore, Punjab, Pakistan
- Batting: Right-handed
- Bowling: Slow left-arm orthodox

International information
- National side: Pakistan
- Only Test (cap 117): 3 February 1990 v Australia
- ODI debut (cap 75): 3 January 1990 v Australia
- Last ODI: 25 February 1990 v Australia

Domestic team information
- Years: Team
- 1977–1979: Servis Industries
- 1979–1994: Lahore City
- 1983–1986: Pakistan Railways
- 1986–1999: Habib Bank

Umpiring information
- Tests umpired: 5 (2005–2006)
- ODIs umpired: 43 (2000–2010)
- T20Is umpired: 4 (2008–2010)
- FC umpired: 121 (1999–2012)
- LA umpired: 117 (2000–2012)

Career statistics
Competition	Test	ODI	FC	LA
Matches	1	6	147	127
Runs scored	–	14	1,163	121
Batting average	–	14.00	11.40	6.72
100s/50s	–	0/0	0/0	0/0
Top score	–	7*	38	11*
Balls bowled	48	342	36,290	6,180
Wickets	0	5	641	152
Bowling average	–	46.00	22.58	25.51
5 wickets in innings	–	0	47	0
10 wickets in match	–	0	12	0
Best bowling	–	2/51	8/51	4/14
Catches/stumpings	0/–	0/–	55/–	21/–
- Source: ESPNcricinfo, 3 March 2019

Mohammad Nadeem Ghauri (Urdu: محمد نديم غورى; born 12 October 1962) is a Pakistani former international cricketer and cricket umpire.

== Playing career ==
Ghauri was born in Lahore, Punjab, Pakistan. He played in one Test match and six One Day Internationals (ODI) for his country in 1990. Ghouri's only Test match appearance came against Australia. He has the unfortunate record of scoring neither a run nor taking a wicket in his Test career.

== Umpiring career ==
In 2005, Nadeem Ghauri officiated in his first Test as umpire, making his debut at Dhaka in a Test between Bangladesh and Zimbabwe. Five years earlier, he made his debut as a One Day International umpire in his hometown in a match played between Pakistan and Sri Lanka. Nadeem Ghauri has officiated in five Tests, 43 ODIs and four T20Is.

In 2009, while Ghouri was traveling with the Sri Lankan cricket team to Gaddafi cricket stadium, the bus in which they were riding was attacked by terrorists. Ghouri was not injured.

In April 2013 Nadeem Ghauri was suspended from umpiring for four years by the Pakistan Cricket Board, after being guilty of being willing to accept money for favourable umpiring decisions. In December 2014, he asked the PCB to reconsider his ban.
