= Mohammad Rafique (cricketer) =

Bangladeshi cricketer

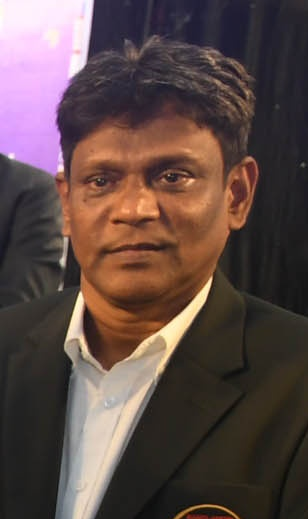
- Rafique in 2025

Personal information
- Full name: Mohammad Rafique
- Born: 5 September 1970 (age 56); Dacca, East Pakistan (present-day Dhaka, Bangladesh)
- Batting: Left-handed
- Bowling: Slow left-arm orthodox
- Role: Allrounder

International information
- National side: Bangladesh (1995–2008)
- Test debut (cap 8): 10 November 2000 v India
- Last Test: 29 February 2008 v South Africa
- ODI debut (cap 27): 5 April 1995 v India
- Last ODI: 10 June 2007 v Africa XI
- ODI shirt no.: 77 (previously 9, 11)
- Only T20I (cap 5): 28 November 2006 v Zimbabwe
- T20I shirt no.: 77

Domestic team information
- Years: Team
- 2000: Sylhet Division
- 2002–2008: Dhaka Division

Career statistics
Competition	Test	ODI	FC	LA
Matches	33	125	62	164
Runs scored	1,059	1,191	1,748	1,551
Batting average	18.57	13.38	18.02	13.14
100s/50s	1/4	0/2	1/9	0/3
Top score	111	77	111	77
Balls bowled	8,744	6,414	16,304	8,430
Wickets	100	125	237	184
Bowling average	40.76	37.91	28.01	31.85
5 wickets in innings	7	1	12	2
10 wickets in match	0	0	2	0
Best bowling	6/77	5/47	7/52	5/16
Catches/stumpings	7/–	28/–	23/–	43/–
- Source: ESPNcricinfo, 25 January 2019

Mohammed Rafique (Bengali: মোহাম্মদ রফিক, born 5 September 1970) is a Bangladeshi cricket coach and former cricketer. He was the first Bangladeshi bowler to take 100 wickets in both formats, Test matches and ODI matches.

Rafique is known for his contribution to Bangladesh Cricket. He played for the World XI in the Super Series against Australia in 2005 and the Asia XI for the exhibition series against Africa XI in 2007. He was named captain of Bangladesh Legends cricket team in 2020-21 Road Safety World Series. On 20 January 2022, Rafique joined Asia Lions along with Habibul Bashar in Legends League Cricket, where he took 2 wickets against India Maharajas.

== Domestic career ==
He started his career as a left arm seamer with the 2nd Division side, Bangladesh Sporting, in 1985. In 1988, he joined Bangladesh Biman cricket team. There, under the influence of the Pakistani allrounder Wasim Haider he converted to slow orthodox spin bowling.

In December 1994, he played for the Bangladesh team in the 2nd SAARC cricket tournament where he took three wickets and conceded twenty five runs, (3/25) against India A.

He was a member of the Bangladesh team that won the 1997 ICC Trophy. Overall, in 9 matches, he took 19 wickets at an average of 10.68 runs per over. His best 4/25 came in the semi-final against Scotland. With his spinning partner Enamul Haque Moni, he took 12 wickets in the tournament. In the final against Kenya he had scored valuable 26 runs of 15 deliveries.

Rafique was banned with 13 professional players for ten years from all forms of cricket by the Bangladesh Cricket Board following his enrollment in the Indian Cricket League (ICL) in August 2008, but renounced his ties with the ICL a year later and had been accepted back into the fold. He played first-class cricket for Dhaka Division.

In the Big Boss T20 Premier League with a match-winning performance for Abahani Limited in the final.

== International career ==
A slow-left-arm orthodox bowler, Rafique was one of the few Bangladeshi players in the ICC bowler rankings' top fifty. He became a permanent feature in the national team and was a household name in Bangladesh. He achieved the double honours of taking 100 wickets and scoring 1000 runs in both formats.

One of the most senior players in the Bangladesh team, Rafique was better known for his abilities in ODIs early in his career. He was nevertheless selected to play in Bangladesh's inaugural Test against India, and showed his promise with three wickets.

His career was almost derailed soon afterwards, when he was reported to the ICC for a suspect action. He was tardy in taking remedial action, and was out of the national team until 2002, when he was picked for the home series against South Africa. His return to cricket was promising, with a six-wicket haul in the second Test against South Africa. He was the highest wicket-taker for Bangladesh in the home Test series against India, and the second highest during the away tour of Zimbabwe.

Rafique is also known as a handy, hard-hitting lower-order batsman. His 77 runs versus Kenya in May 1998 at Hyderabad was instrumental in Bangladesh's first ever ODI win against Kenya. With the ball, he took three wickets for fifty six runs (3/56), and was adjudged the man of the match. He also scored a Test century against the West Indies in Bangladesh's drawn Test. Also he scored 65 runs against Australia in 2005–6, including six sixes.

He was instrumental in steering Bangladesh to a series whitewash against the Kenyans, and recorded his best match figures in Tests against Australia in a match they only narrowly lost. Rafique had a successful 2007 World Cup, taking eight wickets and helping Bangladesh to win games against India and South Africa.

Rafique announced his international retirement on 7 February 2008. Bangladesh's home series against South Africa was his last for the national team. He became the first Bangladeshi to ever take the milestone of 100 test wickets by having Robin Peterson caught at first slip by Junaid Siddique on 1 March during the second test. Out of 53 players who have scored 1,000 runs and taken 100 wickets in Test cricket, Rafique was the first to have represented Bangladesh.
