= List of Bangladesh A international cricketers =

This is a complete list in alphabetical order of the cricketers who have played for the Bangladesh A cricket team in the second tier of international cricket. Like other team lists, details are the player's name followed by his years active in the A team, current players to the end of the 2015–16 season.

== A ==
- Abdul Mazid (2014)
- Abdur Razzak (2003–04 to 2006)
- Abu Jayed (2011–12 to 2015–16)
- Abul Bashar (2011–12)
- Abul Hasan (2012–13 to 2014–15)
- Aftab Ahmed (2003–04)
- Ahsanullah Hasan (2001–02)
- Akram Khan (2001–02 to 2002–03)
- Al Sahariar (1998 to 2003–04)
- Al-Amin Hossain (2011–12 to 2015–16)
- Alamgir Kabir (2001–02 to 2005)
- Alauddin Babu (2011–12 to 2013–14)
- Alok Kapali (2002 to 2011–12)
- Aminul Islam Bulbul (2002–03)
- Anamul Haque (2012–13 to 2015–16)
- Anwar Hossain Monir (2001–02 to 2003–04)
- Anwar Hossain Piju (2001–02 to 2003–04)
- Arafat Sunny (2003–04 to 2015–16)
- Ashiqur Zaman (2022–23)
- Ashraful Haque (2003–04)
- Asif Ahmed (2012–13)

== D ==
- Delwar Hossain (2012–13)
- Dewan Sabbir (2015–16)
- Dhiman Ghosh (2003–04 to 2012)
- Dolar Mahmud (2006–07 to 2012)

== E ==
- Ehsanul Haque (2001–02 to 2005–06)
- Elias Sunny (2010–11 to 2014–15)
- Enamul Haque (2001–02 to 2002–03)
- Enamul Haque (2003–04 to 2012–13)

== F ==
- Fahim Muntasir (2001–02 to 2003–04)
- Faisal Hossain (2003–04 to 2010)
- Farhad Hossain (2008 to 2014–15)
- Farhad Reza (2005–06 to 2014–15)

== G ==
- Gazi Alamgir (2003–04)
- Gazi Salahuddin (2006–07)

== H ==
- Habibul Bashar (1994–95-1998)
- Halim Shah (2003–04)
- Hannan Sarkar (2001–02 to 2009–10)
- Hasanuzzaman (1995–96 to 2002–03)
- Hasanuzzaman (2005)
- Hasibul Hossain (2002–03 to 2006)
- Humayun Kabir (2003–04)

== I ==
- Imran Ahmed (2009 to 2009–10)
- Imrul Kayes (2008 to 2014)

== J ==
- Jahurul Islam (2006–07 to 2013–14)
- Jamaluddin Ahmed (2003–04 to 2005–06)
- Javed Omar (2002 to 2006–07)
- Jubair Hosain Likhon (2015–16)
- Jubair Hossain (2014–15 to 2015–16)
- Junaid Siddique (2006–07 to 2013–14)

== K ==
- Kamrul Islam Rabbi (2010–11 to 2015–16)
- Kazi Kamrul Islam (2011–12 to 2012)
- Khaled Mahmud (1994–95 to 2001–02)
- Khaled Mashud (1994–95 to 2006–07)

== L ==
- Liton Das (2014–15 to 2015–16)

== M ==
- Mahbubul Alam (2006 to 2010)
- Mahmudul Hasan (2010 to 2015–16)
- Mahmudullah (2004–05 to 2011–12)
- Manjural Islam Monju (2003–04)
- Manjural Islam Rana (1999–00 to 2006–07)
- Marshall Ayub (2006–07 to 2014–15)
- Mashrafe Mortaza (2001–02 to 2010)
- Mazharul Haque (2001–02 to 2003–04)
- Mehrab Hossain senior (1999–00 to 2002–03)
- Mehrab Hossain junior (2005 to 2011–12)
- Minhajul Abedin (2002–03)
- Mithun Ali (2011–12 to 2015–16)
- Mohammad Ashraful (2001–02 to 2010–11)
- Mohammad Nazmul Hossain (2005–06 to 2012–13)
- Mohammad Rafique (1995–96 to 2001–02)
- Mohammad Rafiqul Islam (2001–02 to 2002)
- Mohammad Salim (2003–04)
- Mohammad Shahid (2013–14 to 2015–16)
- Mohammad Shahzada (2006–07)
- Mohammad Sharif (2004–05 to 2006–07)
- Mominul Haque (2011–12 to 2015–16)
- Moniruzzaman (2003–04)
- Mosaddek Hossain (2001–02 to 2003–04)
- Mosaddek Hossain (2013–14 to 2015–16)
- Mosharraf Hossain (2005–06 to 2011–12)
- Muktar Ali (2011–12 to 2015–16)
- Mushfiqur Rahim (2004–05 to 2008)
- Mushfiqur Rahman (1999–00 to 2005)

== N ==
- Nabil Samad (2010)
- Nadif Chowdhury (2005–06 to 2011–12)
- Naeem Islam (2008 to 2015–16)
- Nafees Iqbal (2001–02 to 2011–12)
- Naimur Rahman (1999–00 to 2002–03)
- Nasir Hossain (2010–11 to 2015–16)
- Nasiruddin Faruque (2003–04 to 2012–13)
- Nazimuddin (2003–04 to 2011–12)
- Nazmul Hossain Milon (2010)
- Nazmul Islam (2011–12 to 2012–13)
- Nazmus Sadat (2005–06 to 2009)
- Niamur Rashid (1998 to 2001–02)
- Noor Hossain (2009–10 to 2011–12)
- Nurul Hasan (2013–14 to 2015–16)

== R ==
- Rajin Saleh (1999–00 to 2009–10)
- Ranjan Das (1999–00 to 2001–02)
- Raqibul Hasan (2004–05 to 2014–15)
- Rashidul Haque (2003–04)
- Refatuzzaman (2011–12)
- Robiul Islam (2009–10 to 2014)
- Rony Talukdar (2011–12 to 2015–16)
- Rubel Hossain (2008 to 2015–16)

== S ==
- Sabbir Khan (2002)
- Sabbir Rahman (2011–12 to 2015–16)
- Sadman Islam (2015–16)
- Saghir Hossain (2003–04 to 2011–12)
- Sajidul Islam (2008 to 2009)
- Sajjad Kadir (2001–02)
- Sanwar Hossain (2001–02 to 2004–05)
- Saqlain Sajib (2010 to 2015–16)
- Shadman Islam (2014–15 to 2015–16)
- Shafaq Al Zabir (2004–05 to 2005–06)
- Shafiul Islam (2011–12 to 2015–16)
- Shahadat Hossain (2003–04 to 2014–15)
- Shahin Hossain (2005 to 2009)
- Shahriar Hossain (1995–96 to 2003–04)
- Shahriar Nafees (2004–05 to 2014–15)
- Shakib Al Hasan (2004–05 to 2008)
- Shamsur Rahman (2004–05 to 2014)
- Sharifullah (2009)
- Shuvagata Hom (2009–10 to 2015–16)
- Sohag Gazi (2011–12 to 2013)
- Soumya Sarkar (2012–13 to 2015–16)
- Subashis Roy (2014)
- Suhrawadi Shuvo (2008 to 2012)
- Syed Rasel (2004–05 to 2011–12)

== T ==
- Taijul Islam (2013–14 to 2015–16)
- Talha Jubair (2001–02 to 2010)
- Tamim Iqbal (2008)
- Tapash Baisya (2002 to 2006–07)
- Tareq Aziz (2001–02 to 2009)
- Tariq Ahmed (2009)
- Tasamul Haque (2011–12 to 2015–16)
- Taskin Ahmed (2011–12 to 2015–16)
- Tushar Imran (2001–02 to 2006–07)

== U ==
- Uttam Sarkar (2010)

== W ==
- Waseluddin Ahmed (2004–05)

== Z ==
- Ziaur Rahman (2009 to 2013–14)
