= Bangladeshi cricket team in South Africa in 2002–03 =

	South Africa	Bangladesh
- Dates: 27 September 2002 – 27 October 2002
Captains	SM Pollock (ODIs and 2nd Test); MV Boucher (1st Test)	Khaled Mashud

Test series
- Result: South Africa won the 2-match series 2–0
Most runs	G Kirsten (310)	Al Sahariar (146)
Most wickets	M Ntini (12)	Talha Jubair (4)
- Player of the series: JH Kallis (SA)

One Day International series
- Results: South Africa won the 3-match series 3–0
Most runs	HH Gibbs (265)	Khaled Mashud (72)
Most wickets	M Ntini (7)	Talha Jubair (6)
- Player of the series: HH Gibbs (SA)

The Bangladesh national cricket team toured South Africa during the 2002–03 season. They played a two-match Test series and a three-match One Day International series against the South Africa national cricket team. South Africa won the Test series 2–0 and the ODI series 3–0.

== Squad ==
Bangladesh	South Africa
Khaled Mashud (c); Al Sahariar; Alok Kapali; Habibul Bashar; Javed Omar; Khaled Mahmud; Manjural Islam; Mohammad Rafique; Talha Jubair; Tapash Baisya; Tushar Imran; Hannan Sarkar; Sanwar Hossain; Rafiqul Islam; Anwar Hossain	Mark Boucher; Gary Kirsten; Herschelle Gibbs; Graeme Smith; Jacques Kallis; Ashwell Prince; Martin van Jaarsveld; ~~Paul Adams~~; David Terbrugge; Claude Henderson; Makhaya Ntini; Nantie Hayward; Alfonso Thomas

== Test matches ==
=== 1st Test ===
18–21 October 2002

South Africa	v	Bangladesh
529/4d (129 overs); GC Smith 200 (287); Talha Jubair 2/108 (26 overs)		170 (58.4 overs); Habibul Bashar 38 (66); M Ntini 5/19 (15 overs)
		252 (f/o) (87.5 overs); Al Sahariar 71 (93); DJ Terbrugge 5/46 (15 overs)

South Africa won by an innings and 107 runs
Buffalo Park, East London
Umpires: DJ Harper (AUS) and RB Tiffin (ZIM)
Player of the match: GC Smith (SA)

- Bangladesh won the toss and elected to field.
- The match was scheduled for five days but completed in four.
- M van Jaarsveld (SA) made his Test debut.

=== 2nd Test ===
25–27 October 2002
Scorecard

Bangladesh	v	South Africa
215 (69.5 overs); Hannan Sarkar 65 (86); JH Kallis 2/26 (13 overs)		482/5d (121 overs); G Kirsten 160 (227); Talha Jubair 2/109 (26 overs)
107 (30.3 overs); Al Sahariar 27 (42); JH Kallis 5/21 (4.3 overs)

South Africa won by an innings and 160 runs
North West Cricket Stadium, Potchefstroom
Umpires: DJ Harper (AUS) and RB Tiffin (ZIM)
Player of the match: JH Kallis (SA)

- Bangladesh won the toss and elected to bat.
- The match was scheduled for five days but completed in three.
- Rafiqul Islam (BAN) made his Test debut.

== ODI series summary ==
=== 1st ODI ===
3 October 2002 (D/N)
Scorecard

South Africa; 301/8 (50 overs)	v	Bangladesh; 133 (41.5 overs)
HH Gibbs 153 (131); Talha Jubair 4/65 (10 overs)		Khaled Mashud 34* (85); JH Kallis 4/33 (8.5 overs)

South Africa won by 168 runs
North West Cricket Stadium, Potchefstroom
Umpires: BF Bowden (NZ) and BG Jerling (SA)
Player of the match: HH Gibbs (SA)

- South Africa won the toss and elected to bat.

=== 2nd ODI ===
6 October 2002
Scorecard

Bangladesh; 154/9 (50 overs)	v	South Africa; 155/0 (20.2 overs)
Tapash Baisya 35* (46); M Ntini 3/28 (10 overs)		HH Gibbs 97* (66)

South Africa won by 10 wickets
Willowmoore Park, Benoni
Umpires: BF Bowden (NZ) and IL Howell (SA)
Player of the match: HH Gibbs (SA)

- South Africa won the toss and elected to field.
- M van Jaarsveld (SA) made his ODI debut.

=== 3rd ODI ===
9 October 2002 (D/N)
Scorecard

Bangladesh; 151 (43.1 overs)	v	South Africa; 152/3 (25.4 overs)
Habibul Bashar 51 (67); SM Pollock 4/24 (9 overs)		M van Jaarsveld 42 (33); Talha Jubair 2/41 (6 overs)

South Africa won by 7 wickets
De Beers Diamond Oval, Kimberley
Umpires: BF Bowden (NZ) and BG Jerling (SA)
Player of the match: SM Pollock (SA)

- Bangladesh won the toss and elected to bat.
- Anwar Hossain Monir and Rafiqul Islam (both BAN) and AG Prince (SA) made their ODI debuts.
