= Bangladeshi cricket team in the West Indies in 2004 =

International cricket tour

The Bangladesh national cricket team toured the West Indies from May to June 2004 to play two Test matches and three Limited Overs Internationals.

== Squads ==
West Indies	Bangladesh
Brian Lara (c)	Habibul Bashar (c)
Ridley Jacobs (wk)	Khaled Mashud (wk)
Omari Banks	Alamgir Kabir
Tino Best	Alok Kapali
Shivnarine Chanderpaul	Enamul Haque
Pedro Collins	Faisal Hossain
Fidel Edwards	Hannan Sarkar
Chris Gayle	Javed Omar
Jermaine Lawson	Manjural Islam
Ramnaresh Sarwan	Mohammad Ashraful
Devon Smith	Mohammad Rafique
Dwayne Smith	Mushfiqur Rahman
Ian Bradshaw	Rajin Saleh
Dwayne Bravo	Tapash Baisya
Sylvester Joseph	Tareq Aziz
Ravi Rampaul	Khaled Mahmud
	Shahriar Hossain

== One Day Internationals (ODIs) ==
=== 1st ODI ===
15 May 2004
Scorecard

Bangladesh; 144/8 (50 overs)	v	West Indies; 145/9 (46.4 overs)
Mohammad Rafique 32* (59); TL Best 4/35 (10 overs)		RL Powell 52 (64); Manjural Islam 3/21 (10 overs)

West Indies won by 1 wicket
Arnos Vale Stadium, Kingstown, Saint Vincent and the Grenadines
Umpires: EA Nicholls (WI) and DR Shepherd (ENG)
Player of the match: IDR Bradshaw (WI)

- West Indies won the toss and elected to field.
- TL Best (WI) made his ODI debut.

=== 2nd ODI ===
16 May 2004
Scorecard

West Indies; 124/7 (25 overs)	v	Bangladesh; 101/8 (25 overs)
DR Smith 62* (62); Tapash Baisya 4/16 (5 overs)		Hannan Sarkar 36 (55); IDR Bradshaw 3/15 (5 overs)

West Indies won by 23 runs
Arnos Vale Stadium, Kingstown, Saint Vincent and the Grenadines
Umpires: BR Doctrove (WI) and DR Shepherd (ENG)
Player of the match: DR Smith (WI)

- Bangladesh won the toss and elected to field.
- The match was reduced before play started to 25 overs per side.

=== 3rd ODI ===
19 May 2004
Scorecard

Bangladesh; 118/7 (25 overs)	v	West Indies; 119/3 (24.1 overs)
Habibul Bashar 42 (45); DR Smith 3/24 (4 overs)		DS Smith 39* (70); Manjural Islam 1/21 (5 overs)

West Indies won by 7 wickets
Queen's Park, St. George's, Grenada
Umpires: EA Nicholls (WI) and DR Shepherd (ENG)
Player of the match: DS Smith (WI)

- Bangladesh won the toss and elected to bat.
- The match was reduced before play started to 25 overs per side.
- Faisal Hossain (BAN) made his ODI debut.

== Test series summary ==
=== 1st Test ===
28 May–1 June 2004
Scorecard

Bangladesh	v	West Indies
416 (135.3 overs); Habibul Bashar 113 (131); PT Collins 4/83 (27.3 overs)		352 (116.4 overs); CH Gayle 141 (293); Mushfiqur Rahman 4/65 (25.4 overs)
271/9dec (105.2 overs); Khaled Mashud 103* (281); RR Sarwan 4/37 (20 overs)		113/0 (23 overs); CH Gayle 66* (72)

Match drawn
Beausejour Stadium, Gros Islet, Saint Lucia
Umpires: DJ Harper (AUS) and JW Lloyds (ENG)
Player of the match: CH Gayle (WI)

- Bangladesh won the toss and elected to bat.
- Faisal Hossain and Tareq Aziz (both BAN) made their Test debuts.

=== 2nd Test ===
4–7 June 2004
Scorecard

Bangladesh	v	West Indies
284 (95 overs); Tapash Baisya 48 (64); OAC Banks 4/87 (31 overs)		559/4dec (151 overs); RR Sarwan 261* (402); Tareq Aziz 1/76 (19 overs)
176 (51 overs); Habibul Bashar 77 (96); PT Collins 6/53 (18 overs)

West Indies won by an innings and 99 runs
Sabina Park, Kingston, Jamaica
Umpires: RE Koertzen (SA) and JW Lloyds (ENG)
Player of the match: RR Sarwan (WI)

- Bangladesh won the toss and elected to bat.
- The match was scheduled for five days but completed in four.
- Bangladesh's score of 284, in their 1st innings is the highest team total without a 50-run partnership.
