= Bangladeshi cricket team in Australia in 2003 =

	Australia	Bangladesh
- Dates: 27 June 2003 – 6 August 2003
Captains	Steve Waugh	Khaled Mahmud

Test series
- Result: Australia won the 2-match series 2–0
Most runs	Darren Lehmann (287)	Hannan Sarkar (166)
Most wickets	Stuart MacGill (17)	Mashrafe Mortaza (4)
- Player of the series: Stuart MacGill (Australia)

One Day International series
- Results: Australia won the 3-match series 3–0
Most runs	Ricky Ponting (130)	Alok Kapali (83)
Most wickets	Ian Harvey (5); Brad Hogg (5)	Mohammad Rafique (3); Mashrafe Mortaza (3)
- Player of the series: Ricky Ponting (Australia)

The Bangladesh national cricket team played two Test matches and three One Day International (ODI) matches on a mid-year tour of Australia in 2003. They were captained by all-rounder Khaled Mahmud. The Australians were under a split captaincy—Steve Waugh in the Tests and Ricky Ponting in the following ODIs. The series marked the first time a Test match had been played outside an Australian state capital city; with matches played at Bundaberg Rum Stadium in Cairns, and the newly upgraded Marrara Oval in Darwin.

Australia easily won the two-match Test series. Bangladesh's performances' did not get any better during the ODI series—failing to score more than 147 in any innings—as Australia completed a clean-sweep.

== Background ==
Bangladesh had struggled to come to terms with International cricket since becoming the tenth Test team in November 2000. Before their 2003 tour of Australia, Bangladesh had only one Test draw, which came against lowly ranked Zimbabwe, and not a single Test win. Their One Day International (ODI) form had also been poor since their historic victory over Pakistan in the 1999 Cricket World Cup. The victory subsequently paved the way for their admission to Test cricket. In Bangladesh's last series before Australia, they were defeated by an innings in both matches by South Africa. Australia, however, had a 3–1 away Test victory—starting in April—against the West Indies, and a 4–3 ODI victory over the same opposition. Earlier in the year, they remained unbeaten (10 matches) in winning the 2003 ODI Cricket World Cup in South Africa. Led by Ricky Ponting, Australia defeated India in the final, despite losing leg-spiner Shane Warne. Prior to the start of the World Cup, Warne—Australia's highest Test wicket-taker—was sent home from South Africa after a drug test during the recent one-day series in Australia returned a positive result for a banned diuretic. He was consequently banned from International and first-class cricket for a year.

The day before the first Test, former Australian batsman David Hookes said Bangladesh were not worthy of Test status. He also indicated that Australia could win either Test within a day.

== Squads ==
=== Test ===
Bangladesh	Australia
Khaled Mahmud (c)	Steve Waugh (c)
Al Sahariar	Andy Bichel
Alok Kapali	Adam Gilchrist (wk)
Anwar Hossain Monir	Jason Gillespie
Habibul Bashar	Matthew Hayden
Hannan Sarkar	Brad Hogg
Javed Omar	Justin Langer
Khaled Mashud (wk)	Brett Lee
Manjural Islam	Darren Lehmann
Mashrafe Mortaza	Martin Love
Mohammad Ashraful	Stuart MacGill
Mohammad Rafique	Glenn McGrath
Sanwar Hossain	Ricky Ponting
Tapash Baisya
Tareq Aziz

=== ODI ===
Bangladesh	Australia
Khaled Mahmud (c)	Ricky Ponting (c)
Al Sahariar	Michael Bevan
Alok Kapali	Andy Bichel
Anwar Hossain Monir	Adam Gilchrist (wk)
Habibul Bashar	Jason Gillespie
Hannan Sarkar	Ian Harvey
Hasibul Hossain	Matthew Hayden
Javed Omar	Brad Hogg
Khaled Mashud (wk)	Brett Lee
Mashrafe Mortaza	Darren Lehmann
Mohammad Ashraful	Damien Martyn
Mohammad Rafique	Andrew Symonds
Sanwar Hossain	Brad Williams
Tapash Baisya
Tushar Imran

== Test series ==
=== First Test ===
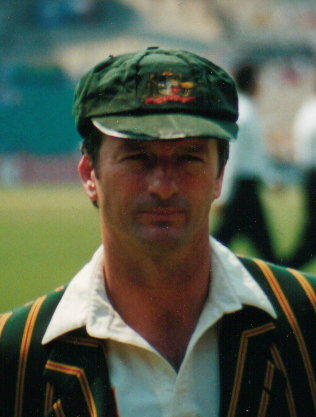
Australian captain Steve Waugh (pictured) scored his 31st Test century in the match.

Marrara Oval became the 89th Test venue—and the eighth in Australia. On a slow and low drop-in pitch airlifted from Melbourne a month before the match, Australia won the toss and elected to field. Bangladesh collapsed and were bowled out for 97 within three hours, with only Mohammad Ashraful (23) and Khaled Mahmud (21) providing resistance. All four Australian bowlers chimed in, as Glenn McGrath and Brett Lee took three wickets apiece. McGrath and Jason Gillespie surpassed the duo of Keith Miller and Ray Lindwall as Australia's most successful opening-bowling combination. Bangladesh's shot selection did not impress coach Dav Whatmore who said, "A few players presented their wickets and that's just the area we're trying to improve." Australia initially struggled to come to terms with the pitch, falling to 2/43 when Ricky Ponting was dismissed for 10. Darren Lehmann started the carnage, scoring his second Test century (110). Steve Waugh then became only the second player after Gary Kirsten to score a century against all Test playing nations. Upon reaching the milestone, he promptly declared Australia's innings on 7/407. Only Bangladesh's fastest bowler, Mashrafe Mortaza proved threatening, taking three wickets for 74 runs (3/74) in 23 overs. After the days play, Lehmann said, "It was hard work out there. They stuck to their guns pretty well, they put it in the right areas and made it tough to score runs." When asked about becoming only the second batsman to score a hundred against all nine Test-playing nations, Waugh said:

If you play long enough you are going to reach milestones and records are going to be passed and I'm sure someone down the track will beat those. But it is nice to achieve things and to score a hundred against every country is something I'm proud of. I'm not too concerned about records. I just want to go out there and play well and I've said if I don't think I can improve then I shouldn't be there.

The Bangladeshis—needing 310 runs to make Australia bat again—counterattacked before the conclusion of day two. Despite losing Javed Omar, leg before wicket to McGrath for five, opening batsman Hannan Sarkar and their leading International run-scorer, Habibul Bashar took the score to 89. The pair scored at a run-rate of 3.98 runs per over, before the partnership was ended when Sarkar was caught behind for 35. This sparked a collapse, with Bangladesh bowled out for 178. Australian leg spinner Stuart MacGill took 5/65—his seventh Test five-wicket haul—as Australia won by an innings and 132 runs. Along with being named man of the match, Waugh overtook West Indian Clive Lloyd as the most successful captain in Test history, enjoying his 37th victory.

18 July - 20 July
Scorecard

Bangladesh	v	Australia
97 (42.2 overs); Mohammad Ashraful 23 (52); Glenn McGrath 3/20 (13 overs)		407/7d (117.5 overs); Darren Lehmann 110 (221); Mashrafe Mortaza 3/74 (23 overs)
178 (51.1 overs); Habibul Bashar 54 (91); Stuart MacGill 5/65 (13.1 overs)

Australia won an innings and 132 runs
Marrara Oval, Darwin, Australia, Att: 13,862
Umpires: Rudi Koertzen and David Shepherd
Player of the match: Steve Waugh

=== Second Test ===
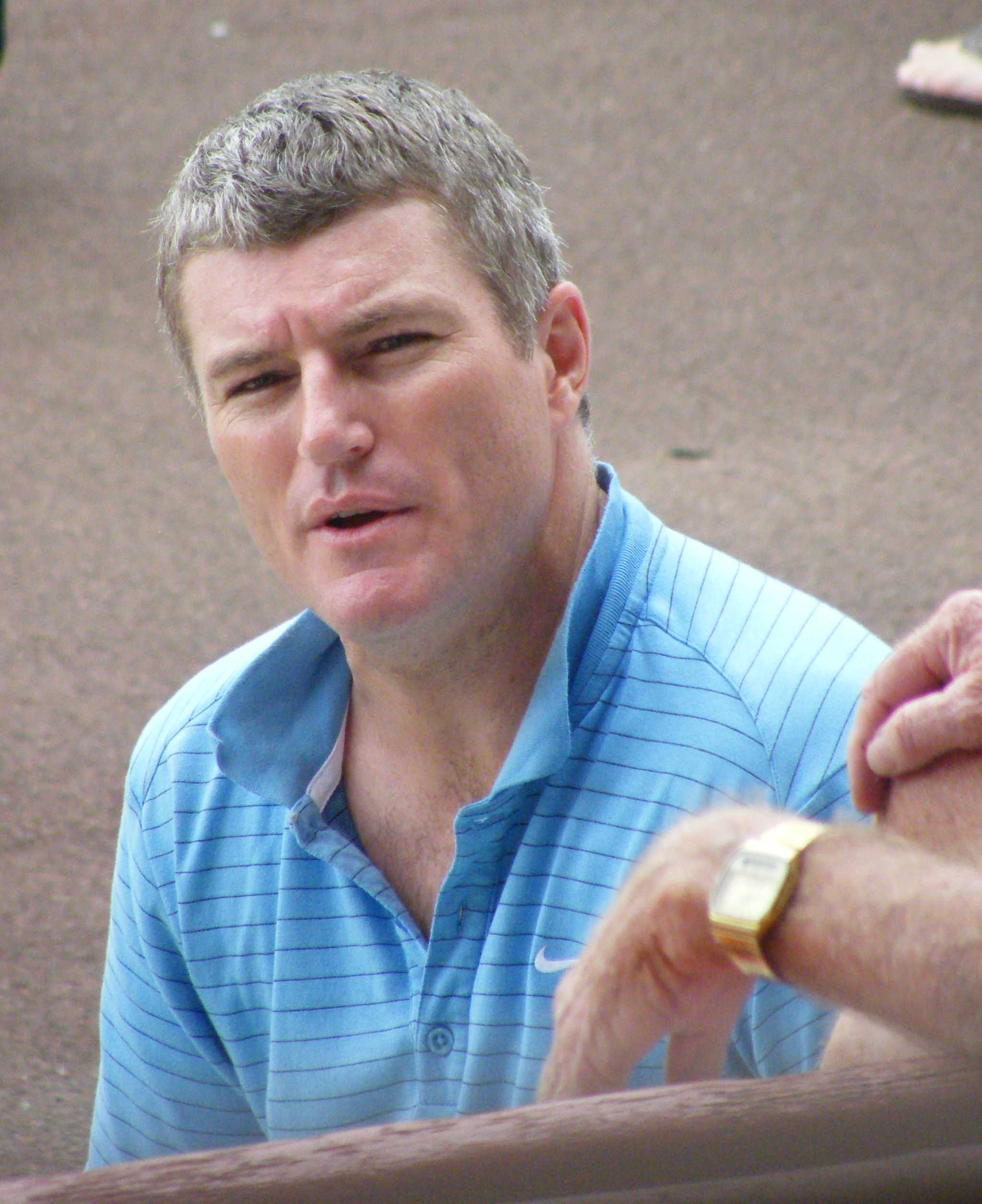
Stuart MacGill (pictured) was named Man of the Test Series with 17 wickets.

Bundaberg Rum Stadium became the 90th Test venue—and the ninth in Australia. According to Wisden, " ... Rain had left question marks about the quality of the pitch, which looked green and enticing for the Australian fast bowlers." When Australia won the toss and sent Bangladesh into bat, there were fears Bangladesh would struggle to score 100 in either innings. On a surface which "played much better than expected," and was a "much faster pitch than that in Darwin," Sarkar scored 76, hitting nine boundaries in the process. He and Bashar put on 108 for second wicket as the Australian bowlers lacked penetration. Omar (26), Bashar (46), Sanwar Hossain (46) and Khaled Mashud (44) all got starts, but could not continue their good work as Bangladesh were eventually bowled out for 295 early on the second morning. MacGill took another five-wicket haul as the rest of the bowlers apart from Gillespie had limited success, with Waugh bowling himself for five overs in search of a breakthrough. Despite Langer (1) falling early, Hayden (50) and Ponting (59) both scored half-centuries, taking Australia to 2/105. Both Lehmann and Waugh continued with their Darwin form, scoring 177 and 156 respectively. This was Waugh's 32nd Test century, taking him ahead of Sachin Tendulkar and behind only Sunil Gavaskar (34). Lehmann's innings included 105 runs between tea and the close of play on day two. When eventually dismissed, Martin Love compiled his first Test century. With 2/128, Hossain was the only bowler who took more than one wicket. His suspect bowling action would later be reported to the International Cricket Council.

Sarkar scored another half-century in Bangladesh's second innings before succumbing to a 'wild swipe' off MacGill. The leg-spinner took his third five-wicket haul in as many innings and Gillespie took three wickets in the space of eight balls. Despite being dismissed for 163, Waugh thought Bangladesh's batting was "a lot better than a lot of efforts by the West Indies in recent years and Pakistan in Sharjah." Despite two centuries from Lehmann and Waugh, MacGill was named man of the series, with 17 wickets. Whatmore was also pleased with the Bangladesh improvement between Tests.

Well we stretched the game out to a day longer than we did in Darwin. I thought there was definite improvement. To fight back and get 295 in the first innings, I thought was excellent. Playing against that quality of opposition is not easy. Maybe against other opposition in future it might be just that little bit easier and we can progress. Most people were talking about the pace battery of the Australian team but the person who won man of the series and got the most wickets was the spinner [Stuart MacGill]. I think maybe we didn't apply the same amount of effort against the slower bowler as we did against the quicks."

25 July - 28 July
Scorecard

Bangladesh	v	Australia
295 (92.1 overs); Hannan Sarkar 76 (136); Stuart MacGill 5/77 (24 overs)		556/4d (139.2 overs); Darren Lehmann 177 (207); Sanwar Hossain 2/128 (30 overs)
163 (58.4 overs); Hannan Sarkar 55 (104); Stuart MacGill 5/56 (20 overs)

Australia won an innings and 98 runs
Bundaberg Rum Stadium, Cairns, Australia, Att: 13,279
Umpires: Rudi Koertzen and David Shepherd
Player of the match: Stuart MacGill

== One Day series ==
=== 1st ODI ===
After putting Bangladesh into bat, the Australians soon took early wickets. On a pitch that was quicker than the Test strip, Bangladesh looked all at sea against the pace of Lee and Gillespie. They soon crashed to 4/19 and never recovered, eventually bowled out for 105 in the 34th over. Only three batsmen managed double figures as the pace duo took seven wickets between them. Andy Bichel also chimed in with 2/24.

Because of Bangladesh's meagre batting performance, the Australian innings began before lunch and opener Adam Gilchrist scored a typically quick-fire 18 before he was caught behind from Mortaza. Hayden (46) and Ponting then got valuable batting practice as they shared a 74-run partnership. Ponting was eventually bowled by Rafique for 29. Damien Martyn's stay at the crease was cut short, in his first International match since breaking his finger in the 2003 Cricket World Cup, he faced just one ball before Australia won by eight wickets with more than 27 overs to spare. Along with the wicket of Ponting, Rafique conceded just seven runs in five overs.

2 August
Scorecard

Bangladesh; 105 (34 overs)	v	Australia; 107/2 (22.3 overs)
Tushar Imran 28 (33); Brett Lee 4/25 (8 overs)		Matthew Hayden 46* (58); Mohammad Rafique 1/7 (5 overs)

Australia won by 8 wickets
Bundaberg Rum Stadium, Cairns, Australia
Umpires: David Shepherd & Simon Taufel
Player of the match: Brett Lee

- Australia won the toss and elected to field.

=== 2nd ODI ===
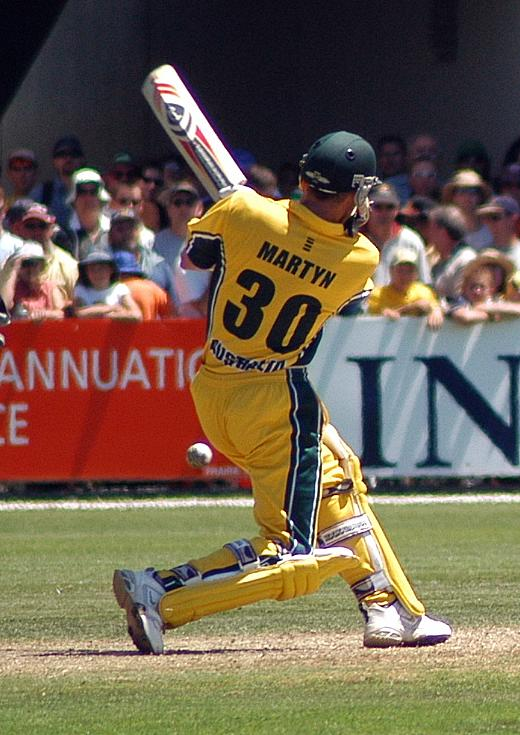
Despite returning in the series for the first time since missing the 2003 Cricket World Cup because of a broken finger, Damien Martyn (pictured) scored 91.

The Bangladeshis won the toss and elected to bat. Their openers put on a steady opening partnership, before Sarkar (who was now playing as a wicket-keeper in the absence of Khaled Mashud) was caught behind off Ian Harvey for 19, with the score at 37 after 14 overs. His opening partner, Javed Omar, fell nine runs later, for 11. Hossain also came and went quickly, as Bangladesh were restricted to 3/52, despite surviving Lee's spell. Only Bashar (31) offered any sort of resistance, as the middle order crumbled under the spin of Brad Hogg, who took 3/31. Alok Kapali provided some lower-order entertainment, striking 34 from 44 balls. Lehmann finished off the tail, collecting 3/16, as Bangladesh were dismissed for 147 in the 46th over.

In the absence of Bangladesh's opening bowler, Mortaza, Australia opened the innings with Andrew Symonds and Michael Bevan— giving the usual middle-order batsmen time at the crease. The Symonds experiment did not last long, as he was dismissed by Hasibul Hossain for seven. Martyn joined Bevan at the crease and quickly put the bowlers on the back foot with aggressive batting. Despite returning in the series for the first time since the 2003 Cricket World Cup because of a broken finger, he scored Australia's second fastest ODI half-century—22 balls—and was on track to overtake Gilchrist's and Allan Border's record for the fastest Australian ODI century; 78 deliveries. Together they added 131 runs from 91 balls, seeing Australia home by nine wickets. Named man of the match, Martyn finished with 92 from 51 balls, dominating the partnership with Bevan, who scored 40 from 62 balls. Martyn was especially severe on Bangladeshi captain Khaled Mahmud, hitting three fours and a six from successive balls in Mahmud's second over. The captain finished with the unflattering figures of 0/34 from three overs.

3 August
Scorecard

Bangladesh; 147 (45.1 overs)	v	Australia; 148/1 (20.2 overs)
Alok Kapali 34 (44); Darren Lehmann 3/16 (4.1 overs)		Damien Martyn 92* (51); Hasibul Hossain 1/37 (6 overs)

Australia won by 9 wickets
Bundaberg Rum Stadium, Cairns, Australia
Umpires: David Shepherd & Steve Davis
Player of the match: Damien Martyn

- Bangladesh won the toss and elected to bat.

=== 3rd ODI ===
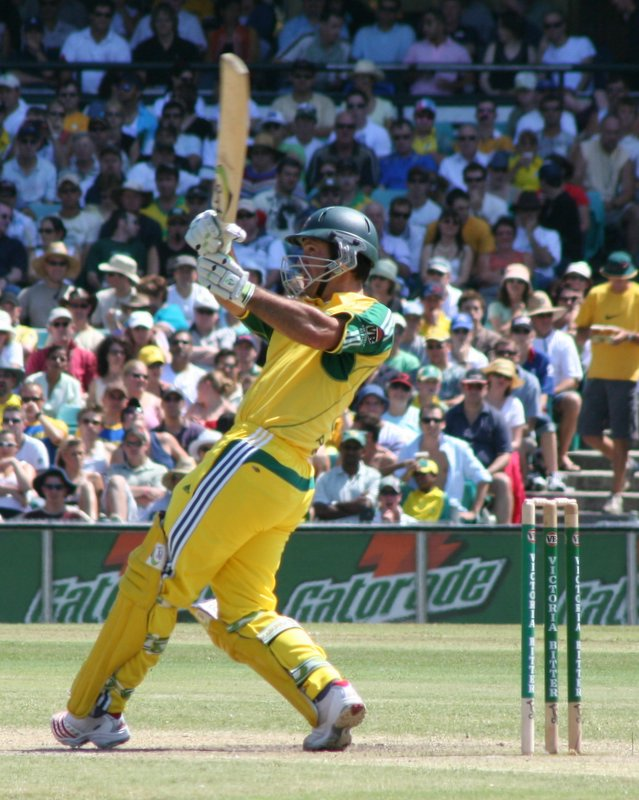
Australian ODI captain Ricky Ponting (pictured), struck his 12th International century in 12 months.

The series finished in Darwin, with Australian skipper Ricky Ponting winning the toss and electing to bat. They were restricted to 4/114—partly due to the tight bowling of Rafique who picked up two wickets—before the Australian captain stabilised the innings. He scored a composed century, as he and Bevan put on a run-a-ball 127 run stand. Strangely, Ponting's 14th ODI century, included only two fours, despite hitting four sixes. Australia finished on 7/254 from their 50 overs. On return, Mortaza took two late innings wickets; however, the rest of the bowling (apart from Rafique and Kapali) again lacked penetration.

Thanks to some tight bowling, Bangladesh slumped to 5/36. Both Bashar (2) and Mohammad Ashraful (4) were dismissed charging Bichel and Harvey respectively, before Kapali compiled a determined 49 in a 66 run sixth-wicket partnership with Hossain. These shots were possibly caused by tight bowling from Jason Gillespie, who took 1/16 in 10 overs. Bangladesh were bowled out for 142 in the 48th over, with Ian Harvey taking four for 16. Ponting received the man of the match and series awards, as Australia won by 112 runs. According to cricket historian Gideon Haigh, "Almost a quarter of the combined populations of Cairns and Darwin attended the cricket" during the Test and ODI series.

6 August
Scorecard

Australia; 254/7 (50 overs)	v	Bangladesh; 142 (47.3 overs)
Ricky Ponting 101 (118); Mohammad Rafique 2/31 (10 overs)		Alok Kapali 49 (64); Ian Harvey 4/16 (6.3 overs)

Australia won by 112 runs
Marrara Oval, Darwin, Australia
Umpires: David Shepherd & Simon Taufel
Player of the match: Ricky Ponting

- Australia won the toss and elected to bat.
