= English cricket team in Bangladesh in 2003–04 =

	England	Bangladesh
- Dates: 12 October – 12 November 2003
Captains	Michael Vaughan	Khaled Mahmud

Test series
- Result: England won the 2-match series 2–0
Most runs	Michael Vaughan (208)	Mushfiqur Rahman (114)
Most wickets	Steve Harmison (9); Richard Johnson (9); Matthew Hoggard (9)	Mohammad Rafique (10)
- Player of the series: Matthew Hoggard (Eng)

One Day International series
- Results: England won the 3-match series 3–0
Most runs	Andrew Flintoff (177)	Mushfiqur Rahman (58)
Most wickets	Andrew Flintoff (7)	Mushfiqur Rahman (5)
- Player of the series: Andrew Flintoff (Eng)

The English cricket team toured Bangladesh from 12 October to 12 November 2003, playing a two-match Test series and a three-match One Day International series; England won all five matches to take whitewashes in both series. In preparation for the Test series, they also played two three-day tour matches against a Bangladesh Cricket Board President's XI and the Bangladesh A team.

== Tour matches ==
=== Three-day: Bangladesh Cricket Board President's XI vs England XI ===
12–14 October 2003
Scorecard

England XI	v	BCB President's XI
253 (100.1 overs); Marcus Trescothick 90 (175); Enamul Haque Jr 4/59 (27.1 overs)		57 (30.3 overs); Aftab Ahmed 10 (22); Matthew Hoggard 6/13 (9.3 overs)
69/1d (14.3 overs); Graham Thorpe 47* (42); Enamul Haque Jr 1/3 (1.3 overs)		143/9 (66 overs); Aftab Ahmed 45 (69); Gareth Batty 3/22 (15 overs)

Match drawn
Bangabandhu National Stadium, Dhaka
Umpires: Nadir Shah (Ban) and Ziaul Islam (Ban)
Player of the match: Marcus Trescothick (England XI)

- BCB President's XI won the toss and elected to field.
- Play on Day 1 started at 14:30, resulting in only 37 overs being bowled in the day.

=== Three-day: Bangladesh A vs England XI ===
16–18 October 2003
Scorecard

Bangladesh A	v	England XI
242 (88.5 overs); Nafees Iqbal 118 (168); Steve Harmison 3/35 (10 overs)		333 (84.4 overs); Marcus Trescothick 96 (117); Alamgir Kabir 3/58 (14.3 overs)
81/4 (33 overs); Nafees Iqbal 31 (53); Gareth Batty 3/19 (7 overs)

Match drawn
Bangladesh Krira Shikkha Protisthan Ground, Savar
Umpires: AFM Akhtaruddin (Ban) and Syed Mahabubullah (Ban)

- Bangladesh A won the toss and elected to bat.

== Test series ==
=== 1st Test ===
21–25 October 2003
Scorecard

Bangladesh	v	England
203 (83.5 overs); Khaled Mashud 51 (129); Steve Harmison 5/35 (21.5 overs)		295 (120.3 overs); Marcus Trescothick 113 (194); Mashrafe Mortaza 3/41 (23 overs)
255 (107 overs); Hannan Sarkar 59 (149); Steve Harmison 4/44 (25 overs)		164/3 (39.2 overs); Michael Vaughan 81* (115); Mohammad Rafique 2/57 (13.2 overs)

England won by 7 wickets
Bangabandhu National Stadium, Dhaka
Umpires: Aleem Dar (Pak) and Asoka de Silva (SL)
Player of the match: Steve Harmison (Eng)

- Bangladesh won the toss and elected to bat.
- Enamul Haque Jr (Ban), Gareth Batty and Rikki Clarke (both Eng) made their Test debuts.

=== 2nd Test ===
29 October–1 November 2003
Scorecard

England	v	Bangladesh
326 (135.3 overs); Nasser Hussain 76 (266); Mashrafe Mortaza 4/60 (28 overs)		152 (62.1 overs); Rajin Saleh 32 (102); Richard Johnson 5/49 (21 overs)
293/5d (67 overs); Nasser Hussain 95 (144); Mohammad Rafique 3/106 (29 overs)		138 (37.1 overs); Khaled Mahmud 33 (40); Richard Johnson 4/44 (12.1 overs)

England won by 329 runs
MA Aziz Stadium, Chittagong
Umpires: Aleem Dar (Pak) and Asoka de Silva (SL)
Player of the match: Richard Johnson (Eng)

- Bangladesh won the toss and elected to field.
- Martin Saggers (Eng) made his Test debut.

== ODI series ==
=== 1st ODI ===
7 November 2003
Scorecard

Bangladesh; 143 (44.4 overs)	v	England; 144/3 (25.3 overs)
Hannan Sarkar 30 (55); Andrew Flintoff 4/14 (9.4 overs)		Andrew Flintoff 55* (52); Mushfiqur Rahman 2/34 (6 overs)

England won by 7 wickets
MA Aziz Stadium, Chittagong
Umpires: Aleem Dar (Pak) and Mahbubur Rahman (Ban)
Player of the match: Andrew Flintoff (Eng)

- Bangladesh won the toss and elected to bat.
- Jamaluddin Ahmed, Manjural Islam Rana and Nafees Iqbal (all Ban) made their ODI debuts.

=== 2nd ODI ===
10 November 2003 (D/N)
Scorecard

Bangladesh; 134/9 (50 overs)	v	England; 137/3 (27.4 overs)
Rajin Saleh 37 (77); Richard Johnson 3/22 (10 overs)		Andrew Flintoff 70* (47); Tapash Baisya 2/35 (7 overs)

England won by 7 wickets
Bangabandhu National Stadium, Dhaka
Umpires: AFM Akhtaruddin (Ban) and Aleem Dar (Pak)
Player of the match: Andrew Flintoff (Eng)

- Bangladesh won the toss and elected to bat.
- Moniruzzaman (Ban) made his ODI debut.

=== 3rd ODI ===
12 November 2003 (D/N)
Scorecard

Bangladesh; 182 (49.1 overs)	v	England; 185/3 (39.3 overs)
Mushfiqur Rahman 36 (37); Rikki Clarke 2/28 (6 overs)		Andrew Flintoff 52* (39); Mushfiqur Rahman 2/29 (10 overs)

England won by 7 wickets
Bangabandhu National Stadium, Dhaka
Umpires: Aleem Dar (Pak) and Mahbubur Rahman (Ban)
Player of the match: Andrew Flintoff (Eng)

- Bangladesh won the toss and elected to bat.
