= Dhaka Metropolis cricket team =

First-class cricket team based in Dhaka, Bangladesh

Personnel
- Captain: Naim Sheikh

Team information
- Founded: 2000
- Home ground: Sher-e-Bangla National Cricket Stadium

History
- NCL wins: 0
- One Day Cricket League wins: 0

The Dhaka Metropolis cricket team was a Bangladeshi first-class cricket team based in Dhaka, Bangladesh. The team competed in the National Cricket League.

Dhaka Metropolis featured in the 2000–01 season, playing most of its home games at the Dhanmondi Cricket Stadium in Dhaka. When the National Cricket League was expanded from six teams to eight in 2011–12, Dhaka Metropolis returned, along with the newly formed Rangpur Division team. The team was discontinued in 2025, replaced in national competitions by a new team representing Mymensingh Division.

== Honours ==
- National Cricket League
  - Runners-up: 2015–16
- National Cricket League Division 2
  - Winners: 2022–23
  - Runners-up: 2018–19, 2019–20

== Notable players ==
The following is a list of players who played for both Dhaka Metropolis and Bangladesh.

- Akram Khan
- Al Sahariar
- Aminul Islam Bulbul
- Anwar Hossain
- Elias Sunny
- Enamul Haque
- Habibul Bashar
- Hasibul Hossain
- Khaled Mahmud
- Khaled Mashud
- Manjural Islam
- Mehrab Hossain
- Mehrab Hossain, Jr.
- Mohammad Ashraful
- Mohammad Rafique
- Morshed Ali Khan
- Naimur Rahman
- Niamur Rashid
- Nabiul Islam Nayeem
- Sajjad Ahmed
- Salahuddin Ahmed
- Talha Jubair
- Tareq Aziz

Dhaka Metropolis players who have played for countries other than Bangladesh:

- (Pakistan) Zahoor Elahi

== Records ==
At the end of the 2024–25 season Dhaka Metropolis had played 97 first-class matches, with 26 wins, 24 losses and 47 draws. Their highest individual score was 250 by Shadman Islam in 2023–24. The best bowling figures were 8 for 35 by Talha Jubair in 2012–13.

== Other source ==
- Wisden Cricketers Almanack (annual)
