= List of Bangladesh ODI cricketers =

A One Day International (ODI) is an international cricket match between two representative teams, each having ODI status, as determined by the International Cricket Council (ICC). An ODI differs from Test matches in that the number of overs per team is limited, and that each team has only one innings, 154 players have represented the Bangladesh national team in ODIs, since its debut in 1986.

Bangladesh gained ODI status on the 10 October 1997 following their win at the 1997 ICC Trophy. Previously they held special ODI status for the Asia Cup between 1986 and 1995 with an appearance at the 1990 Austral-Asia Cup. The team's first appearance in a One Day International was at the 1986 Asia Cup where was defeated by seven wickets over Pakistan and it would twelve years until they recorded their first victory against Kenya in 1998 in their twenty-third ODI which at the time was a record.

This list includes all players who have played at least one ODI match and is initially arranged in the order of debut appearance. Where more than one player won their first cap in the same match, those players are initially listed alphabetically at the time of debut.

== Key ==
General

- ‡ – Captain
- † – Wicket-keeper
- First – Year of ODI debut for Bangladesh
- Last – Year of latest ODI for Bangladesh
- Mat – Number of ODI appearances for Bangladesh

Batting

- Runs – Runs scored in career
- HS – Highest score
- Avg – Runs scored per dismissal
- * – Batsman remained not out

Bowling

- Balls – Balls bowled in career
- Wkt – Wickets taken in career
- BBI – Best bowling in an innings
- Ave – Average runs per wicket
- 5WI – Five wickets or more in a match

Fielding

- Ca – Catches taken
- St – Stumpings effected

== Players ==
Last updated 23 October 2025.

Bangladesh ODI cricketers
| General | | | | | Batting | | | | | Bowling | | | | | Fielding | |
| Cap | Name | First | Last | Mat | Runs | HS | Avg | 50 | 100 | Balls | Wkt | BBI | Avg | 5WI | Ca | St |
|---|---|---|---|---|---|---|---|---|---|---|---|---|---|---|---|---|
| 1 | Gazi Ashraf | 1986 | 1990 | 7 | 59 | 18 | 8.42 | 0 | 0 | 51 | 2 | 1/7 | 16.50 | 0 | 1 | — |
| 2 | Gholam Nousher | 1986 | 1990 | 9 | 8 | 4 | 8.00 | 0 | 0 | 408 | 5 | 1/27 | 62.80 | 0 | 0 | — |
| 3 | Golam Faruq | 1986 | 1990 | 5 | 44 | 23* | 22.00 | 0 | 0 | 186 | 2 | 1/22 | 58.00 | 0 | 0 | — |
| 4 | Hafizur Rahman | 1986 | 1986 | 2 | 8 | 8 | 8.00 | 0 | 0 | — | — | — | — | — | 2 | — |
| 5 | Jahangir Shah | 1986 | 1990 | 5 | 16 | 8* | 8.00 | 0 | 0 | 234 | 2 | 2/23 | 86.00 | 0 | 1 | — |
| 6 | Minhajul Abedin | 1986 | 1999 | 27 | 453 | 68* | 18.87 | 2 | 0 | 546 | 13 | 2/39 | 39.30 | 0 | 2 | — |
| 7 | Nurul Abedin | 1986 | 1990 | 4 | 15 | 13 | 3.75 | 0 | 0 | — | — | — | — | — | 0 | — |
| 8 | Rafiqul Alam | 1986 | 1986 | 2 | 24 | 14 | 12.00 | 0 | 0 | — | — | — | — | — | 0 | — |
| 9 | Raqibul Hasan | 1986 | 1986 | 2 | 17 | 12 | 8.50 | 0 | 0 | 1 | 0 | — | — | — | 1 | — |
| 10 | Samiur Rahman | 1986 | 1986 | 2 | 4 | 4 | 2.00 | 0 | 0 | 60 | 0 | — | — | — | 1 | — |
| 11 | Shaheedur Rahman | 1986 | 1986 | 2 | 62 | 37 | 31.00 | 0 | 0 | — | — | — | — | — | 0 | — |
| 12 | Aminul Islam Bulbul | 1988 | 2002 | 39 | 794 | 70 | 23.35 | 3 | 0 | 412 | 7 | 3/57 | 58.71 | 0 | 13 | — |
| 13 | Athar Ali Khan | 1988 | 1998 | 19 | 532 | 82 | 29.55 | 3 | 0 | 420 | 6 | 2/33 | 60.83 | 0 | 2 | — |
| 14 | Azhar Hossain | 1988 | 1990 | 7 | 96 | 54 | 13.71 | 1 | 0 | 263 | 4 | 1/20 | 52.25 | 0 | 2 | — |
| 15 | Harunur Rashid | 1988 | 1988 | 2 | 0 | 0 | 0.00 | 0 | 0 | — | — | — | — | — | 0 | — |
| 16 | Nasir Ahmed | 1988 | 1990 | 7 | 25 | 11 | 12.50 | 0 | 0 | — | — | — | — | — | 1 | 1 |
| 17 | Zahid Razzak | 1988 | 1990 | 3 | 14 | 6 | 4.66 | 0 | 0 | — | — | — | — | — | 0 | — |
| 18 | Akram Khan | 1988 | 2003 | 44 | 976 | 65 | 23.23 | 5 | 0 | 117 | 0 | — | — | — | 8 | — |
| 19 | Faruk Ahmed | 1988 | 1999 | 7 | 105 | 57 | 15.00 | 1 | 0 | — | — | — | — | — | 2 | — |
| 20 | Wahidul Gani | 1988 | 1988 | 1 | — | — | — | — | — | 36 | 0 | — | — | — | 0 | — |
| 21 | Enamul Haque | 1990 | 2002 | 29 | 236 | 32 | 11.23 | 0 | 0 | 1238 | 19 | 2/40 | 57.00 | 0 | 6 | — |
| 22 | Jahangir Alam Talukdar | 1990 | 1990 | 2 | 7 | 7* | — | 0 | 0 | 42 | 0 | — | — | — | 0 | — |
| 23 | Saiful Islam | 1990 | 1997 | 7 | 37 | 22* | 18.50 | 0 | 0 | 303 | 6 | 4/36 | 42.66 | 0 | 0 | — |
| 24 | Anisur Rahman | 1995 | 1998 | 2 | 2 | 2 | 1.00 | 0 | 0 | 48 | 0 | — | — | — | 0 | — |
| 25 | Javed Omar | 1995 | 2007 | 59 | 1312 | 85* | 23.85 | 10 | 0 | — | — | — | — | — | 12 | — |
| 26 | Khaled Mashud | 1995 | 2006 | 126 | 1818 | 71* | 21.90 | 7 | 0 | — | — | — | — | — | 91 | 35 |
| 27 | Mohammad Rafique^{1} | 1995 | 2007 | 123 | 1190 | 77 | 13.52 | 2 | 0 | 6294 | 119 | 5/47 | 38.75 | 1 | 28 | — |
| 28 | Sajjad Ahmed | 1995 | 1995 | 2 | 15 | 11 | 7.50 | 0 | 0 | — | — | — | — | — | 0 | — |
| 29 | Habibul Bashar | 1995 | 2007 | 111 | 2168 | 78 | 21.68 | 14 | 0 | 175 | 1 | 1/31 | 142.00 | 0 | 26 | — |
| 30 | Hasibul Hossain | 1995 | 2004 | 32 | 172 | 21* | 8.60 | 0 | 0 | 1375 | 29 | 4/56 | 46.13 | 0 | 6 | — |
| 31 | Naimur Rahman | 1995 | 2002 | 29 | 488 | 47 | 19.52 | 0 | 0 | 1094 | 10 | 2/51 | 90.40 | 0 | 7 | — |
| 32 | Sheikh Salahuddin | 1997 | 1997 | 6 | 24 | 12 | 12.00 | 0 | 0 | 246 | 4 | 2/48 | 62.25 | 0 | 0 | — |
| 33 | Mafizur Rahman | 1997 | 1997 | 4 | 53 | 16 | 17.66 | 0 | 0 | 66 | 0 | — | — | — | 1 | — |
| 34 | Zakir Hasan | 1997 | 1997 | 1 | — | — | — | — | — | 12 | 0 | — | — | — | 0 | — |
| 35 | Jahangir Alam | 1997 | 1999 | 3 | 4 | 3 | 1.33 | 0 | 0 | — | — | — | — | — | 0 | 1 |
| 36 | Shahriar Hossain | 1997 | 2004 | 3 | 98 | 44 | 19.80 | 0 | 0 | — | — | — | — | — | 0 | 1 |
| 37 | Shafiuddin Ahmed | 1997 | 2000 | 11 | 22 | 11 | 5.50 | 0 | 0 | 495 | 11 | 3/42 | 38.72 | 0 | 0 | — |
| 38 | Khaled Mahmud | 1998 | 2006 | 77 | 991 | 50 | 14.36 | 1 | 0 | 3385 | 67 | 4/19 | 42.76 | 0 | 17 | — |
| 39 | Sanwar Hossain | 1998 | 2003 | 27 | 290 | 52 | 11.60 | 1 | 0 | 383 | 10 | 3/49 | 32.70 | 0 | 11 | — |
| 40 | Shariful Haque | 1998 | 1998 | 1 | 10 | 10 | 10.00 | 0 | 0 | 18 | 0 | — | — | — | 0 | — |
| 41 | Zakir Hossain | 1998 | 1998 | 1 | 0 | 0 | 0.00 | 0 | 0 | 24 | 0 | — | — | — | 0 | — |
| 42 | Mehrab Hossain | 1998 | 2003 | 18 | 449 | 101 | 24.94 | 2 | 1 | 30 | 0 | — | — | — | 6 | — |
| 43 | Morshed Ali Khan | 1998 | 1998 | 3 | 2 | 2* | — | 0 | 0 | 138 | 2 | 1/26 | 42.50 | 0 | 2 | — |
| 44 | Al Sahariar | 1999 | 2003 | 29 | 374 | 62* | 13.35 | 2 | 0 | — | — | — | — | — | 7 | — |
| 45 | Manjural Islam | 1999 | 2003 | 34 | 53 | 13 | 5.88 | 0 | 0 | 1591 | 24 | 3/37 | 53.50 | 0 | 4 | — |
| 46 | Aminul Islam, Jr. | 1999 | 1999 | 1 | 1 | 1* | — | 0 | 0 | 30 | 1 | 1/33 | 33.00 | 0 | 0 | — |
| 47 | Mahbubur Rahman | 1999 | 1999 | 1 | 3 | 3 | 3.00 | 0 | 0 | — | — | — | — | — | 0 | — |
| 48 | Niamur Rashid | 1999 | 1999 | 2 | 5 | 4* | 5.00 | 0 | 0 | 78 | 1 | 1/46 | 46.00 | 0 | 1 | — |
| 49 | Ahmed Kamal | 1999 | 1999 | 1 | 11 | 11 | 11.00 | 0 | 0 | 30 | 1 | 1/39 | 39.00 | 0 | 0 | — |
| 50 | Mushfiqur Rahman | 2000 | 2004 | 28 | 360 | 49 | 16.36 | 0 | 0 | 1332 | 19 | 2/21 | 51.73 | 0 | 6 | — |
| 51 | Mohammad Sharif | 2001 | 2007 | 9 | 53 | 13* | 13.25 | 0 | 0 | 499 | 10 | 3/40 | 42.40 | 0 | 1 | — |
| 52 | Mohammad Ashraful^{1} | 2001 | 2013 | 175 | 3468 | 109 | 22.37 | 20 | 3 | 697 | 18 | 3/26 | 36.72 | 0 | 35 | — |
| 53 | Fahim Muntasir | 2001 | 2002 | 3 | 6 | 5 | 3.00 | 0 | 0 | 169 | 0 | — | — | — | 2 | — |
| 54 | Mashrafe Mortaza^{1} | 2001 | 2020 | 218 | 1773 | 51* | 13.85 | 1 | 0 | 10827 | 269 | 6/26 | 32.65 | 1 | 61 | — |
| 55 | Tushar Imran | 2001 | 2007 | 41 | 574 | 65 | 14.35 | 2 | 0 | 126 | 1 | 1/24 | 103.00 | 0 | 6 | — |
| 56 | Tareq Aziz | 2002 | 2004 | 10 | 26 | 11* | 26.00 | 0 | 0 | 465 | 13 | 3/19 | 32.61 | 0 | 4 | — |
| 57 | Alok Kapali | 2002 | 2011 | 59 | 1235 | 115 | 19.60 | 5 | 1 | 1452 | 24 | 3/49 | 52.29 | 0 | 29 | — |
| 58 | Tapash Baisya | 2002 | 2007 | 56 | 336 | 35* | 12.00 | 0 | 0 | 2608 | 59 | 4/16 | 41.55 | 0 | 8 | — |
| 59 | Hannan Sarkar | 2002 | 2004 | 20 | 383 | 61 | 19.15 | 3 | 0 | 3 | 0 | — | — | — | 8 | — |
| 60 | Mazharul Haque | 2002 | 2002 | 1 | 3 | 3 | 3.00 | 0 | 0 | 4 | 0 | — | — | — | 0 | — |
| 61 | Talha Jubair | 2002 | 2003 | 6 | 5 | 4* | 2.50 | 0 | 0 | 204 | 6 | 4/65 | 42.50 | 0 | 1 | — |
| 62 | Anwar Hossain Monir | 2002 | 2002 | 1 | 0 | 0* | — | 0 | 0 | 48 | 0 | — | — | — | 0 | — |
| 63 | Rafikul Khan | 2002 | 2002 | 1 | 0 | 0 | 0.00 | 0 | 0 | — | — | — | — | — | 0 | — |
| 64 | Ehsanul Haque | 2002 | 2003 | 6 | 57 | 20 | 9.50 | 0 | 0 | 141 | 3 | 2/34 | 37.66 | 0 | 0 | — |
| 65 | Anwar Hossain | 2002 | 2002 | 1 | 42 | 42 | 42.00 | 0 | 0 | — | — | — | — | — | 0 | — |
| 66 | Mohammad Salim | 2003 | 2003 | 1 | 9 | 9 | 9.00 | 0 | 0 | — | — | — | — | — | 1 | — |
| 67 | Rajin Saleh | 2003 | 2006 | 43 | 1005 | 108* | 23.92 | 6 | 1 | 539 | 15 | 4/16 | 30.60 | 0 | 9 | |
| 68 | Jamaluddin Ahmed | 2003 | 2003 | 1 | 18 | 18* | — | 0 | 0 | 24 | 0 | — | — | — | 1 | — |
| 69 | Manjural Islam Rana | 2003 | 2006 | 25 | 331 | 63 | 20.68 | 1 | 0 | 996 | 23 | 4/34 | 29.95 | 0 | 6 | — |
| 70 | Nafees Iqbal | 2003 | 2005 | 16 | 309 | 58 | 19.31 | 2 | 0 | — | — | — | — | — | 2 | — |
| 71 | Al Mohammad Moniruzzaman | 2003 | 2003 | 2 | 1 | 1 | 0.50 | 0 | 0 | — | — | — | — | — | 0 | — |
| 72 | Faisal Hossain | 2004 | 2010 | 6 | 43 | 17 | 10.75 | 0 | 0 | 73 | 1 | 1/27 | 53.00 | 0 | 3 | — |
| 73 | Abdur Razzak | 2004 | 2014 | 153 | 779 | 53* | 13.43 | 1 | 0 | 7965 | 207 | 5/29 | 29.29 | 4 | 32 | — |
| 74 | Aftab Ahmed | 2004 | 2010 | 85 | 1954 | 92 | 24.73 | 14 | 0 | 739 | 12 | 5/31 | 54.66 | 1 | 29 | — |
| 75 | Nazmul Hossain | 2004 | 2012 | 38 | 35 | 6* | 4.37 | 0 | 0 | 1649 | 44 | 4/40 | 31.50 | 0 | 6 | — |
| 76 | Enamul Haque Jr | 2005 | 2009 | 10 | 12 | 5 | 3.00 | 0 | 0 | 576 | 14 | 3/16 | 30.14 | 0 | 8 | — |
| 77 | Shahriar Nafees | 2005 | 2011 | 75 | 2201 | 123* | 31.44 | 13 | 4 | — | — | — | — | — | 13 | — |
| 78 | Syed Rasel | 2005 | 2010 | 52 | 81 | 15 | 5.06 | 0 | 0 | 2657 | 61 | 4/22 | 33.62 | 0 | 8 | — |
| 79 | Shahadat Hossain | 2006 | 2013 | 51 | 79 | 16* | 7.90 | 0 | 0 | 2198 | 47 | 3/34 | 45.59 | 0 | 5 | — |
| 80 | Farhad Reza | 2006 | 2011 | 34 | 412 | 50 | 16.18 | 1 | 0 | 1139 | 22 | 5/42 | 46.22 | 1 | 13 | — |
| 81 | Mushfiqur Rahim | 2006 | 2025 | 274 | 7795 | 144 | 36.42 | 49 | 9 | — | — | — | — | — | 243 | 56 |
| 82 | Shakib Al Hasan | 2006 | 2023 | 247 | 7570 | 134* | 37.29 | 56 | 9 | 12575 | 317 | 5/29 | 29.52 | 4 | 60 | — |
| 83 | Mehrab Hossain, Jr. | 2006 | 2009 | 18 | 276 | 54 | 17.25 | 1 | 0 | 253 | 4 | 2/30 | 53.50 | 0 | 7 | — |
| 84 | Tamim Iqbal | 2007 | 2023 | 243 | 8357 | 158 | 36.65 | 56 | 14 | 6 | 0 | — | — | — | 68 | — |
| 85 | Mahmudullah | 2007 | 2025 | 239 | 5689 | 128* | 36.42 | 32 | 4 | 4380 | 82 | 3/4 | 46.45 | 0 | 82 | — |
| 86 | Junaid Siddique | 2007 | 2011 | 54 | 1196 | 100 | 23.00 | 1 | 6 | 12 | 0 | — | — | — | 23 | — |
| 87 | Dhiman Ghosh | 2008 | 2008 | 14 | 126 | 30 | 14.00 | 0 | 0 | — | — | — | — | — | 9 | 4 |
| 88 | Mosharraf Hossain | 2008 | 2016 | 5 | 26 | 8 | 6.50 | 0 | 0 | 198 | 4 | 3/24 | 36.75 | 0 | 1 | — |
| 89 | Raqibul Hasan | 2008 | 2011 | 55 | 1308 | 89 | 27.82 | 8 | 0 | — | — | — | — | — | 18 | — |
| 90 | Nazimuddin | 2008 | 2012 | 11 | 147 | 47 | 13.36 | 0 | 0 | — | — | — | — | — | 1 | — |
| 91 | Dolar Mahmud | 2008 | 2009 | 7 | 61 | 41 | 15.25 | 0 | 0 | 210 | 8 | 4/28 | 32.25 | 0 | 0 | — |
| 92 | Naeem Islam | 2008 | 2014 | 59 | 975 | 84 | 27.08 | 5 | 0 | 1743 | 35 | 3/32 | 40.20 | 0 | 19 | — |
| 93 | Imrul Kayes | 2008 | 2018 | 78 | 2434 | 144 | 32.02 | 16 | 4 | — | — | — | — | — | 21 | — |
| 94 | Mahbubul Alam | 2009 | 2009 | 5 | 81 | 59 | 40.50 | 1 | 0 | 222 | 7 | 2/42 | 40.00 | 0 | 1 | — |
| 95 | Rubel Hossain | 2009 | 2021 | 104 | 144 | 17 | 4.96 | 0 | 0 | 4678 | 129 | 6/26 | 34.31 | 1 | 20 | — |
| 96 | Shafiul Islam | 2010 | 2020 | 60 | 134 | 24* | 6.09 | 0 | 0 | 2540 | 70 | 4/21 | 36.12 | 0 | 8 | — |
| 97 | Suhrawadi Shuvo | 2010 | 2011 | 17 | 98 | 20* | 14.00 | 0 | 0 | 762 | 14 | 3/14 | 40.85 | 0 | 9 | — |
| 98 | Jahurul Islam | 2010 | 2013 | 14 | 270 | 53 | 22.50 | 1 | 0 | — | — | — | — | — | 7 | — |
| 99 | Nasir Hossain | 2011 | 2018 | 65 | 1281 | 100 | 29.11 | 6 | 1 | 1256 | 24 | 3/26 | 41.16 | 0 | 34 | — |
| 100 | Shuvagata Hom | 2011 | 2011 | 4 | 70 | 35* | 35.00 | 0 | 0 | 12 | 0 | — | — | — | 0 | — |
| 101 | Elias Sunny | 2011 | 2012 | 4 | 2 | 1* | 1.00 | 0 | 0 | 204 | 5 | 2/21 | 32.20 | 0 | 0 | — |
| 102 | Abul Hasan | 2012 | 2018 | 7 | 11 | 7 | 3.66 | 0 | 0 | 216 | 0 | — | — | — | 1 | — |
| 103 | Anamul Haque | 2012 | 2024 | 49 | 1352 | 120 | 29.39 | 5 | 3 | — | — | — | — | — | 15 | — |
| 104 | Mominul Haque | 2012 | 2018 | 28 | 557 | 60 | 22.28 | 3 | 0 | 234 | 7 | 2/13 | 27.14 | 0 | 4 | — |
| 105 | Sohag Gazi | 2012 | 2014 | 20 | 184 | 30 | 15.33 | 0 | 0 | 919 | 22 | 4/29 | 32.81 | 0 | 7 | — |
| 106 | Ziaur Rahman | 2013 | 2014 | 13 | 124 | 41 | 11.27 | 0 | 0 | 390 | 10 | 5/30 | 30.10 | 1 | 5 | — |
| 107 | Robiul Islam | 2013 | 2013 | 3 | 0 | 0* | — | 0 | 0 | 133 | 2 | 1/21 | 58.50 | 0 | 0 | — |
| 108 | Shamsur Rahman | 2013 | 2014 | 10 | 266 | 96 | 26.60 | 2 | 0 | 6 | 0 | — | — | — | 3 | — |
| 109 | Al-Amin Hossain | 2014 | 2020 | 15 | 4 | 2* | 2.00 | 0 | 0 | 663 | 22 | 4/51 | 27.63 | 0 | 1 | — |
| 110 | Arafat Sunny | 2014 | 2015 | 16 | 48 | 15 | 12.00 | 0 | 0 | 830 | 24 | 4/27 | 25.00 | 0 | 5 | — |
| 111 | Mohammad Mithun | 2014 | 2021 | 34 | 714 | 73* | 27.46 | 6 | 0 | 12 | 0 | — | — | — | 7 | — |
| 112 | Taskin Ahmed | 2014 | 2025 | 83 | 237 | 21 | 7.18 | 0 | 0 | 3902 | 117 | 5/28 | 29.86 | 2 | 11 | — |
| 113 | Sabbir Rahman | 2014 | 2019 | 66 | 1333 | 102 | 25.63 | 6 | 1 | 306 | 3 | 1/12 | 115.00 | 0 | 37 | — |
| 114 | Jubair Hossain | 2014 | 2015 | 3 | 5 | 5 | 5.00 | 0 | 0 | 114 | 4 | 2/41 | 28.50 | 0 | 1 | — |
| 115 | Soumya Sarkar | 2014 | 2025 | 79 | 2338 | 169 | 33.40 | 14 | 3 | 558 | 16 | 3/18 | 35.43 | 0 | 43 | — |
| 116 | Taijul Islam | 2014 | 2024 | 20 | 110 | 39* | 10.00 | 0 | 0 | 1050 | 31 | 5/28 | 25.96 | 1 | 3 | — |
| 117 | Litton Das | 2015 | 2025 | 95 | 2569 | 176 | 29.87 | 12 | 5 | — | — | — | — | — | 59 | 4 |
| 118 | Mustafizur Rahman | 2015 | 2025 | 116 | 172 | 20 | 7.47 | 0 | 0 | 5549 | 177 | 6/43 | 27.01 | 5 | 19 | — |
| 119 | Mosaddek Hossain | 2016 | 2022 | 43 | 634 | 52* | 25.36 | 2 | 0 | 1130 | 17 | 3/13 | 57.00 | 0 | 18 | — |
| 120 | Nurul Hasan | 2016 | 2025 | 13 | 237 | 45* | 33.85 | 0 | 0 | — | — | — | — | — | 12 | 5 |
| 121 | Subashis Roy | 2016 | 2016 | 1 | 1 | 1* | — | 0 | 0 | 60 | 1 | 1/45 | 45.00 | 0 | 0 | — |
| 122 | Tanbir Hayder | 2016 | 2016 | 2 | 5 | 3 | 2.50 | 0 | 0 | 60 | 0 | — | — | — | 1 | — |
| 123 | Mehidy Hasan | 2017 | 2025 | 114 | 1790 | 112* | 24.52 | 7 | 2 | 5558 | 121 | 4/25 | 36.55 | 0 | 49 | — |
| 124 | Sunzamul Islam | 2017 | 2018 | 3 | 19 | 19 | 19.00 | 0 | 0 | 150 | 5 | 2/22 | 15.80 | 0 | 0 | — |
| 125 | Mohammad Saifuddin | 2017 | 2021 | 29 | 362 | 51* | 36.20 | 2 | 0 | 1283 | 41 | 4/41 | 31.19 | 0 | 4 | — |
| 126 | Abu Hider | 2018 | 2018 | 2 | 1 | 1 | 1.00 | 0 | 0 | 108 | 3 | 2/50 | 29.66 | 0 | 1 | — |
| 127 | Najmul Hossain Shanto | 2018 | 2025 | 58 | 1705 | 122* | 31.57 | 10 | 3 | 116 | 2 | 1/10 | 61.50 | 0 | 18 | — |
| 128 | Mohammad Nazmul Islam | 2018 | 2018 | 5 | 7 | 7 | 7.00 | 0 | 0 | 264 | 5 | 2/38 | 44.80 | 0 | 2 | — |
| 129 | Fazle Mahmud | 2018 | 2018 | 2 | 0 | 0 | 0.00 | 0 | 0 | 18 | 0 | — | — | 0 | 1 | — |
| 130 | Ariful Haque | 2018 | 2018 | 1 | — | — | — | — | — | 18 | 0 | — | — | — | 0 | — |
| 131 | Abu Jayed | 2019 | 2019 | 2 | — | — | — | — | — | 108 | 5 | 5/58 | 22.80 | 1 | 0 | — |
| 132 | Afif Hossain | 2020 | 2024 | 34 | 667 | 93* | 27.79 | 3 | 0 | 124 | 4 | 1/0 | 30.50 | 0 | 12 | — |
| 133 | Mohammad Naim | 2020 | 2025 | 9 | 102 | 28 | 12.75 | 0 | 0 | — | — | — | — | — | 4 | — |
| 134 | Hasan Mahmud | 2021 | 2025 | 26 | 63 | 15 | 4.84 | 0 | 0 | 1131 | 33 | 5/32 | 35.00 | 2 | 0 | — |
| 135 | Mahedi Hasan | 2021 | 2023 | 11 | 122 | 29* | 15.25 | 0 | 0 | 528 | 14 | 4/71 | 31.14 | 2 | 0 | — |
| 136 | Shoriful Islam | 2021 | 2024 | 40 | 101 | 16 | 7.76 | 0 | 0 | 1842 | 58 | 4/21 | 29.43 | 4 | 0 | — |
| 137 | Yasir Ali | 2022 | 2023 | 9 | 102 | 50 | 14.57 | 1 | 0 | 6 | 0 | — | — | — | 3 | — |
| 138 | Nasum Ahmed | 2022 | 2025 | 20 | 201 | 44 | 18.27 | 0 | 0 | 976 | 21 | 3/11 | 33.66 | 0 | 4 | — |
| 139 | Ebadot Hossain | 2022 | 2023 | 12 | 3 | 1* | 1.50 | 0 | 0 | 540 | 22 | 4/42 | 22.90 | 1 | 0 | — |
| 140 | Towhid Hridoy | 2023 | 2025 | 44 | 1265 | 100 | 34.18 | 11 | 1 | 1 | 0 | — | — | 0 | 11 | — |
| 141 | Mrittunjoy Chowdhury | 2023 | 2023 | 1 | 8 | 8 | 8.00 | 0 | 0 | 48 | 0 | — | — | — | 2 | — |
| 142 | Rony Talukdar | 2023 | 2023 | 1 | 4 | 4 | 4.00 | 0 | 0 | — | — | — | — | — | 1 | — |
| 143 | Tanzid Hasan | 2023 | 2025 | 28 | 558 | 84 | 20.66 | 4 | 0 | — | — | — | — | — | 9 | — |
| 144 | Shamim Hossain | 2023 | 2025 | 7 | 33 | 16 | 8.25 | 0 | 0 | 102 | 2 | 1/22 | 41.00 | 0 | 3 | — |
| 145 | Tanzim Hasan Sakib | 2023 | 2025 | 15 | 151 | 45 | 18.87 | 0 | 0 | 683 | 24 | 3/14 | 27.29 | 4 | 0 | — |
| 146 | Khaled Ahmed | 2023 | 2023 | 2 | 1 | 1 | 1.00 | 0 | 0 | 80 | 3 | 3/60 | 24.00 | 0 | 0 | — |
| 147 | Zakir Hasan | 2023 | 2024 | 2 | 5 | 4 | 2.50 | 0 | 0 | — | — | — | — | — | 0 | — |
| 148 | Rishad Hossain | 2023 | 2025 | 14 | 176 | 48* | 19.55 | 0 | 0 | 733 | 22 | 6/35 | 29.13 | 0 | 8 | — |
| 149 | Jaker Ali | 2024 | 2025 | 12 | 394 | 68 | 39.40 | 3 | 0 | — | — | — | — | — | 5 | 1 |
| 150 | Nahid Rana | 2024 | 2025 | 5 | 6 | 4* | — | 0 | 0 | 264 | 5 | 2/40 | 45.00 | 0 | 2 | — |
| 151 | Parvez Hossain Emon | 2025 | 2025 | 3 | 108 | 67 | 36.00 | 1 | 0 | — | — | — | — | — | 1 | — |
| 152 | Tanvir Islam | 2025 | 2025 | 9 | 42 | 11 | 7.00 | 0 | 0 | 528 | 16 | 5/39 | 23.18 | 1 | 3 | — |
| 153 | Saif Hassan | 2025 | 2025 | 9 | 42 | 11 | 7.00 | 0 | 0 | 73 | 4 | 3/6 | 11.50 | 0 | 4 | — |
| 154 | Mahidul Islam Ankon | 2025 | 2025 | 3 | 69 | 46 | 23.00 | 0 | 0 | — | — | — | — | — | 0 | — |

Notes:

- ^{1} Mohammad Rafique, Mohammad Ashraful and Mashrafe Mortaza also played 2 ODI matches for the Asia XI. Only their records for Bangladesh are given above.

== See also ==
- One Day International
- Bangladesh national cricket team
- List of Bangladesh Test cricketers
- List of Bangladesh Twenty20 International cricketers
