= Zahid Razzak =

Bangladeshi cricketer (born 1967)

Personal information
- Full name: Shah Mohammad Zahid Razzak
- Born: 2 August 1967 (age 59); Chittagong, East Pakistan
- Nickname: Masum
- Batting: Right-handed
- Role: Batsman

International information
- National side: Bangladesh
- ODI debut (cap 17): 27 October 1988 v India
- Last ODI: 30 April 1990 v Australia
- Source: CricInfo, 13 February 2006

Zahid Razzak is a former Bangladeshi cricketer who played in three One Day Internationals from 1988 to 1990. After scores of 6,4,4, his ODI career ended. He also failed in two International Cricket Council trophy tournaments (in 1986 and in 1990). Nevertheless, he was more successful in the lower tiers of the game.
