= List of Bangladesh Test cricketers =

This is a list of Bangladeshi Test cricketers. A Test match is an international cricket match between two of the leading cricketing nations. The list is arranged in the order in which each player won his Test cap. Where more than one player won his first Test cap in the same Test match, those players are listed alphabetically by given name.

== Key ==
General

- ‡ – Captain
- † – Wicket-keeper
- First – Year of debut
- Last – Year of latest game
- Mat – Number of matches played

Batting

- Innings – Innings batted
- NO – Times Not out
- Runs – Runs scored in career
- HS – Highest score
- Avg – Runs scored per dismissal
- * – Batsman remained not out

Bowling

- Balls – Balls bowled in career
- Mdn – Maiden overs bowled in career
- Wkt – Wickets taken in career
- BBI – Best bowling in an innings
- Ave – Average runs per wicket

Fielding

- Ca – Catches taken
- St – Stumpings taken

== Players ==
Statistics are correct as of 23 November 2025.

Bagladesh Test cricketers
Cap	Name	First	Last	Mat	Runs	HS	Avg	Balls	Wkt	BBI	Ave	Ca	St	Ref(s)
Cap	Name	First	Last	Mat	Batting			Bowling				Fielding		Ref(s)
1	Akram Khan	2000	2003	8	259	44	16.18	0	–	–	–	3	0	
2	Al Sahariar	2000	2003	15	683	71	22.76	0	–	–	–	10	0	
3	Aminul Islam Bulbul	2000	2002	13	530	145	21.20	198	1	1/66	149.00	5	0	
4	Habibul Bashar ‡	2000	2008	50	3,026	113	30.87	282	0	–	–	22	0	
5	Hasibul Hossain	2000	2001	5	97	31	10.77	780	6	2/125	95.16	1	0	
6	Khaled Mashud ‡†	2000	2007	44	1,409	103*	19.04	0	–	–	–	78	9	
7	Mehrab Hossain †	2000	2003	9	241	71	13.38	12	0	–	–	6	0	
8	Mohammad Rafique	2000	2008	33	1,059	111	18.57	8,744	100	6/77	40.76	7	0	
9	Naimur Rahman ‡	2000	2002	8	210	48	15.00	1,321	12	6/132	59.83	4	0	
10	Ranjan Das	2000	2000	1	2	2	1.00	132	1	1/64	72.00	1	0	
11	Shahriar Hossain †	2000	2004	3	99	48	19.80	0	–	–	–	0	1	
12	Javed Omar	2001	2007	40	1,720	119	22.05	12	0	–	–	10	0	
13	Manjural Islam	2001	2004	17	81	21	3.68	2,970	28	6/81	57.32	4	0	
14	Mohammad Sharif	2001	2007	10	122	24*	7.17	1,651	14	4/98	79.00	5	0	
15	Mushfiqur Rahman	2001	2004	10	232	46*	13.64	1,365	13	4/65	63.30	6	0	
16	Enamul Haque	2001	2003	10	180	24*	12.00	2,230	18	4/136	57.05	1	0	
17	Mohammad Ashraful ‡	2001	2013	61	2,737	190	24.00	1,733	21	2/42	60.52	25	0	
18	Khaled Mahmud ‡	2001	2003	12	266	45	12.09	1,620	13	4/37	64.00	2	0	
19	Mashrafe Mortaza ‡	2001	2009	36	797	79	12.85	5,990	78	4/60	41.52	9	0	
20	Sanwar Hossain	2001	2003	9	345	49	19.16	444	5	2/128	62.00	1	0	
21	Fahim Muntasir	2002	2002	3	52	33	8.66	576	5	3/131	68.40	1	0	
22	Alamgir Kabir	2002	2004	3	8	4	2.00	261	0	–	–	0	0	
23	Ehsanul Haque	2002	2002	1	7	5	3.50	18	0	–	–	0	0	
24	Hannan Sarkar	2002	2004	17	662	76	20.06	0	–	–	–	7	0	
25	Talha Jubair	2002	2004	7	52	31	6.50	1,090	14	3/135	55.07	1	0	
26	Alok Kapali	2002	2006	17	584	85	17.69	1,103	6	3/3	118.16	5	0	
27	Tapash Baisya	2002	2005	21	384	66	11.29	3,370	36	4/72	59.36	6	0	
28	Tushar Imran	2002	2007	5	89	28	8.90	60	0	–	–	1	0	
29	Rafikul Khan	2002	2002	1	7	6	3.50	0	–	–	–	0	0	
30	Anwar Hossain	2002	2002	1	14	12	7.00	0	–	–	–	0	0	
31	Mohammad Salim †	2003	2003	2	49	26	16.33	0	–	–	–	3	1	
32	Anwar Hossain Monir	2003	2005	3	22	13	7.33	348	0	–	–	0	0	
33	Rajin Saleh †	2003	2008	24	1,141	89	25.93	438	2	1/9	134.00	15	0	
34	Enamul Haque Jr	2003	2013	15	59	13	5.90	3,555	44	7/95	40.61	3	0	
35	Manjural Islam Rana	2004	2004	6	257	69	25.70	749	5	3/84	80.20	3	0	
36	Faisal Hossain	2004	2004	1	7	5	3.50	0	–	–	–	0	0	
37	Tareq Aziz	2004	2004	3	22	10*	11.00	360	1	1/76	261.00	1	0	
38	Nafees Iqbal	2004	2006	11	518	121	23.54	0	–	–	–	2	0	
39	Aftab Ahmed	2004	2010	16	582	82*	20.78	344	5	2/31	47.40	7	0	
40	Nazmul Hossain	2004	2011	2	16	8*	8.00	329	5	2/61	38.80	0	0	
41	Mushfiqur Rahim ‡†	2005	2025	100	6,510	219*	38.75	0	–	–	–	113	15	
42	Shahadat Hossain	2005	2015	38	521	40	10.01	5,380	72	6/27	51.81	9	0	
43	Shahriar Nafees	2005	2013	24	1,267	138	26.39	0	–	–	–	19	0	
44	Syed Rasel	2005	2007	6	37	19	4.62	879	12	4/129	47.75	0	0	
45	Abdur Razzak	2006	2018	13	248	43	15.50	3,015	28	4/63	59.75	4	0	
46	Shakib Al Hasan ‡	2007	2024	71	4,609	217	37.77	15,675	246	7/36	31.72	29	0	
47	Mehrab Hossain	2007	2009	7	243	83	20.25	407	4	2/29	70.25	2	0	
48	Junaid Siddique	2008	2012	19	969	106	26.18	18	0	–	–	11	0	
49	Sajidul Islam	2008	2013	3	18	6	3.00	330	3	2/71	77.33	0	0	
50	Tamim Iqbal ‡	2008	2023	70	5,134	206	38.89	30	0	–	–	20	0	
51	Naeem Islam	2008	2012	8	416	108	32.00	574	1	1/11	303.00	2	0	
52	Mahbubul Alam	2008	2008	4	5	2	1.25	587	5	2/62	62.80	0	0	
53	Imrul Kayes †	2008	2019	39	1,797	150	24.28	24	0	–	–	35	0	
54	Raqibul Hasan	2008	2011	9	336	65	19.76	42	1	1/0	17.00	9	0	
55	Mahmudullah ‡†	2009	2021	50	2,914	150*	33.49	3,423	43	5/51	45.53	38	1	
56	Rubel Hossain	2009	2020	27	265	45*	9.46	4,223	36	5/166	76.77	11	0	
57	Shafiul Islam	2010	2017	11	211	53	10.55	1,734	17	3/86	55.41	2	0	
58	Jahurul Islam	2010	2013	7	347	48	26.69	0	–	–	–	7	0	
59	Robiul Islam	2010	2014	9	99	33	9.00	1,860	25	6/71	39.68	5	0	
60	Elias Sunny	2011	2013	4	38	20*	7.60	863	12	6/94	43.16	1	0	
61	Nasir Hossain	2011	2017	19	1,044	100	34.80	924	8	3/52	55.25	10	0	
62	Suhrawadi Shuvo	2011	2011	1	15	15	7.50	297	4	3/73	36.50	0	0	
63	Nazimuddin	2011	2012	3	125	78	20.83	0	–	–	–	1	0	
64	Sohag Gazi	2012	2014	10	325	101*	21.66	3,151	38	6/74	42.07	5	0	
65	Abul Hasan	2012	2013	3	165	113	82.50	528	3	2/80	123.66	3	0	
66	Anamul Haque	2013	2025	8	162	39	10.80	0	–	–	–	5	0	
67	Mominul Haque ‡	2013	2025	75	4,859	181	37.66	973	11	3/4	55.18	43	0	
68	Ziaur Rahman	2013	2013	1	14	14	7.00	180	4	4/63	17.75	0	0	
69	Marshall Ayub	2013	2014	3	125	41	20.83	60	0	–	–	2	0	
70	Al-Amin Hossain	2013	2019	7	90	32*	22.50	1,016	9	3/80	60.55	0	0	
71	Shamsur Rahman	2014	2014	6	305	106	25.41	6	0	–	–	7	0	
72	Shuvagata Hom	2014	2016	8	244	50	22.18	846	8	2/66	63.25	8	0	
73	Taijul Islam	2014	2025	57	845	47	10.05	15,310	250	8/39	31.06	26	0	
74	Jubair Hossain	2014	2015	6	13	7*	4.33	715	16	5/96	30.81	2	0	
75	Mohammad Shahid	2015	2015	5	57	25	11.40	630	5	2/23	57.60	0	0	
76	Soumya Sarkar	2015	2021	16	831	149	27.70	508	4	2/68	84.00	23	0	
77	Litton Das ‡†	2015	2025	52	3,117	141	35.42	12	0	–	–	112	17	
78	Mustafizur Rahman	2015	2022	15	66	16	4.40	2,145	31	4/37	36.74	1	0	
79	Kamrul Islam Rabbi	2016	2018	7	51	25*	5.66	750	8	3/87	63.00	0	0	
80	Mehidy Hasan Miraz ‡	2016	2025	56	2,174	104	24.15	13,164	210	7/58	32.47	41	0	
81	Sabbir Rahman	2016	2018	11	481	66	24.05	144	0	–	–	3	0	
82	Subashis Roy	2017	2017	4	14	12*	14.00	749	9	3/118	51.66	0	0	
83	Taskin Ahmed	2017	2024	17	261	75	10.87	3,176	49	6/64	39.26	2	0	
84	Najmul Hossain Shanto ‡	2017	2025	39	2,298	163	32.36	118	0	–	–	33	0	
85	Nurul Hasan †	2017	2023	11	440	64	22.00	0	–	–	–	25	9	
86	Mosaddek Hossain	2017	2022	4	173	75	28.83	162	0	–	–	2	0	
87	Sunzamul Islam	2018	2018	1	24	24	24.00	270	1	1/153	153.00	0	0	
88	Abu Jayed	2018	2021	13	36	8	2.57	1,964	30	4/71	37.26	1	0	
89	Ariful Haque	2018	2018	2	88	41*	29.33	66	1	1/10	24.00	2	0	
90	Nazmul Islam	2018	2018	1	4	4	2.00	174	4	2/27	19.00	0	0	
91	Mohammad Mithun	2018	2021	10	333	67	18.50	0	–	–	–	6	0	
92	Khaled Ahmed	2018	2025	17	55	22	2.75	2,592	32	5/106	48.06	5	0	
93	Nayeem Hasan	2018	2025	14	235	26	13.82	2,656	48	6/105	28.56	7	0	
94	Shadman Islam	2018	2025	26	1,400	120	29.78	0	–	–	–	25	0	
95	Ebadot Hossain	2019	2025	22	82	21*	4.55	3,539	43	6/46	49.09	1	0	
96	Saif Hassan	2020	2021	6	159	43	14.45	36	1	1/22	27.00	0	0	
97	Shoriful Islam	2021	2024	12	144	26	9.60	1,746	26	3/28	34.80	7	0	
98	Yasir Ali	2021	2022	6	205	55	20.50	42	0	–	–	5	0	
99	Mahmudul Hasan Joy	2021	2025	20	1,040	171	28.10	13	0	–	–	10	0	
100	Mohammad Naim	2022	2022	1	24	24	12.00	0	–	–	–	1	0	
101	Zakir Hasan	2022	2024	13	593	100	23.72	0	–	–	–	11	0	
102	Shahadat Hossain	2023	2024	6	190	31	15.83	0	–	–	–	8	0	
103	Nahid Rana	2024	2025	10	17	11	2.42	1,464	27	5/61	41.66	1	0	
104	Hasan Mahmud	2024	2025	13	158	38*	13.16	1,856	36	5/43	30.30	6	0	
105	Jaker Ali †	2024	2025	6	337	91	30.63	0	–	–	–	9	1	
106	Mahidul Islam Ankon †	2024	2024	1	29	29	14.50	0	–	–	–	1	0	

== See also ==
- Test cricket
- Bangladesh national cricket team
- List of Bangladesh ODI cricketers
- List of Bangladesh Twenty20 International cricketers
