= Robiul Islam =

Bangladeshi cricketer (born 1986)

Personal information
- Full name: SK Robiul Islam
- Born: 20 October 1986 (age 40); Satkhira, Bangladesh
- Nickname: Shiplu
- Batting: Right-handed
- Bowling: Right-arm fast-medium
- Role: Bowler

International information
- National side: Bangladesh (2010–2014)
- Test debut (cap 59): 27 May 2010 v England
- Last Test: 13 September 2014 v West Indies
- ODI debut (cap 107): 3 May 2013 v Zimbabwe
- Last ODI: 8 May 2013 v Zimbabwe
- Only T20I (cap 38): 12 May 2013 v Zimbabwe

Domestic team information
- Years: Team
- 2005/06–2010/11: Khulna Division
- 2011/12–present: Sylhet Division

Career statistics
Competition	Test	ODI	FC	LA
Matches	8	3	61	33
Runs scored	99	0	519	139
Batting average	11.00	–	8.94	8.17
100s/50s	0/0	0/0	0/0	0/0
Top score	33	0*	39*	34*
Balls bowled	1,632	133	9,903	1,430
Wickets	23	2	199	36
Bowling average	38.56	58.50	29.17	35.33
5 wickets in innings	2	0	9	0
10 wickets in match	0	0	1	0
Best bowling	6/71	1/21	6/71	4/7
Catches/stumpings	5/–	0/–	26/–	5/–
- Source: ESPNcricinfo, 30 January 2014

SK Robiul Islam (Bengali: রবিউল ইসলাম; born: 20 October 1986) is Bangladeshi former cricket right arm fast-medium bowler who played eight Test and four limited overs matches for Bangladesh between 2010 and 2014. During the 2013 tour of Zimbabwe, he set the Bangladeshi record for most wickets taken by a fast bowler in a Test series, after taking 15 wickets in two matches.

== International career ==
He made his first Test appearance in May 2010 during Bangladesh's tour of England. Robiul Islam was not able to take a wicket in the match, which was won by England. He was not selected for the next Test of the series.

=== Against Zimbabwe ===
In July 2011, Robiul was included in the squad for Bangladesh's one-off Test against Zimbabwe. Zimbabwe were returning from a six-year exile from Tests, although Bangladesh had not played in the format in over 14 months. Though they were expected to win, Bangladesh lost the Test. Robiul Islam opened the bowling with Shafiul Islam, claiming three wickets in the match while conceding 154 runs. His first wicket was that of batsman Hamilton Masakadza, caught by Imrul Kayes.

The West Indies toured in October and Robiul Islam was dropped from the squad for the two Tests as the coach Stuart Law expected to play just two seam bowlers and already had three options: Nazmul Hossain, Rubel Hossain, and Shahadat Hossain.

=== Success in Test ===
Robiul Islam remained around the fringes of the Test team, but it was not until March 2013 during Bangladesh's tour to Sri Lanka that he returned to the Test side, when his 29 wickets from 7 FC matches in Bangladesh's domestic tournament caught the attention of the selectors. In the second match of the series, Robiul Islam played his first Test in 16 months.

The following month, Bangladesh toured Zimbabwe for two Tests. Robiul Islam was included in the squad and finished with 15 wickets at an average of 19.53. This was the most wickets taken by a Bangladesh fast bowler in a Test series, bettering the 12 Shahadat Hossain managed against South Africa in 2008.
