= Ehsanul Haque =

Bangladeshi cricketer (born 1979)

Personal information
- Born: December 1, 1979 (age 46); Chattogram, Bangladesh
- Batting: Right-handed
- Bowling: Right-arm offbreak

International information
- National side: Bangladesh
- Only Test (cap 23): 21 July 2002 v Sri Lanka
- ODI debut (cap 64): 2 December 2002 v West Indies
- Last ODI: 22 February 2003 v South Africa
- ODI shirt no.: 44

Career statistics
Competition	Test	ODI	FC
Matches	1	6	63
Runs scored	7	57	4,017
Batting average	3.50	9.50	39.00
100s/50s	0/0	0/0	10/24
Top score	5	20	186
Balls bowled	18	141	3,116
Wickets	0	3	46
Bowling average	–	37.66	37.89
5 wickets in innings	–	0	0
10 wickets in match	–	0	0
Best bowling	–	2/34	4/87
Catches/stumpings	0/–	0/–	50/–
- Source: ESPNcricinfo, 29 September 2023

Ehsanul Haque (Bengali: এহসানুল হক; born 1 December 1979) is a former Bangladeshi cricketer.

Ehsanul Haque was part of the Bangladesh team that took part in Under-19 World Cup in 1998. When the Green Delta National Cricket League was given first-class status in 2000 he appeared for Chittagong in the first round of matches, this was therefore his first-class debut at the age of 20. In that season he scored 540 runs at an average of just under 39, but struggled during the next season. Despite this he made his Test debut in 2002 against Sri Lanka coming in at 3, he was hit by a bouncer 2nd ball, took 14 deliveries to get off the mark and was eventually dismissed for 2, in the second innings he scored five. It was his only Test match, but he maintained good form in first-class cricket.

Ehsanul Haque made his ODI debut as an opener against West Indies in 2002/03 and earned a place in the World Cup squad. He played in the first four pool games, scoring just 28 runs. In the match against Sri Lanka he was the third victim of Chaminda Vaas's hat-trick and would have been dismissed first ball in consecutive matches if Chris Gayle had not dropped him at second slip off Vasbert Drakes. He was part of the Bangladesh team that lost to Canada, when he scored 13.

In 2008, the Bangladesh Cricket Board appointed him an age group team selector. In 2017, Haque ran against Manjurul Islam for a post on the national selection panel.
