= Ahmed Kamal (cricketer) =

Bangladeshi cricketer (born 1977)

Personal information
- Born: 15 June 1977 (age 49); Kotpara, Kushtia, Bangladesh
- Batting: Right-handed
- Bowling: Right-arm fast-medium

International information
- National side: Bangladesh
- Only ODI (cap 49): 9 October 1999 v West Indies

Career statistics
Competition	ODI	First-class
Matches	1	10
Runs scored	11	91
Batting average	11.00	8.27
100s/50s	0/0	0/0
Top score	11	23
Balls bowled	30	1,509
Wickets	1	16
Bowling average	39.00	35.68
5 wickets in innings	0	0
10 wickets in match	0	0
Best bowling	1/39	4/40
Catches/stumpings	0/–	3/–
- Source: CricketArchive, 3 May 2022

Shaker Ahmed Kamal (born 15 June 1977) is a former Bangladeshi cricketer who played in one One Day International in 1999.
