= Ranjan Das =

Bangladeshi cricketer (born 1982)

Personal information
- Full name: Bikash Ranjan Das
- Born: July 14, 1982 (age 44); Dhaka, Bangladesh
- Batting: Right-handed
- Bowling: Left-arm fast-medium

International information
- National side: Bangladesh
- Only Test (cap 10): 10 November 2000 v India

Career statistics
Competition	Test	First-class
Matches	1	19
Runs scored	2	133
Batting average	1.00	7.00
100s/50s	0/0	0/0
Top score	2	18
Balls bowled	132	2,834
Wickets	1	36
Bowling average	72.00	41.25
5 wickets in innings	0	1
10 wickets in match	0	0
Best bowling	1/64	5/88
Catches/stumpings	1/–	5/–
- Source: Cricinfo, 23 April 2023

Bikash Ranjan Das (Bengali: বিকাশ রঞ্জন দাশ) or Mahmudur Rahman Rana is a Bangladeshi former cricketer, who played in one Test match for the country in year 2000.

== Personal life ==
He converted to Islam in mid-2000s and changed his name to Mahmudur Rahman Rana and is employed at a Dhaka-based bank.
