= Nafees Iqbal =

Bangladeshi cricketer (born 1985)

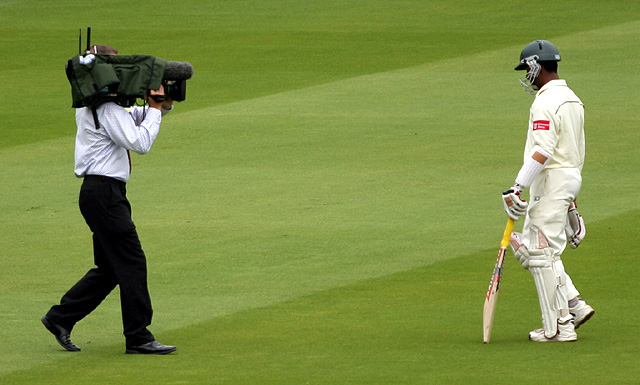

Personal information
- Full name: Mohammad Nafees Iqbal Khan
- Born: 31 January 1985 (age 41); Chittagong, Bangladesh
- Batting: Right-handed
- Bowling: Right-arm medium
- Relatives: Tamim Iqbal (brother); Akram Khan (uncle)

International information
- National side: Bangladesh (2003–2006)
- Test debut (cap 38): 19 October 2004 v New Zealand
- Last Test: 8 March 2006 v Sri Lanka
- ODI debut (cap 70): 7 November 2003 v England
- Last ODI: 18 June 2005 v Australia
- ODI shirt no.: 95

Domestic team information
- Years: Team
- Khelaghar Samaj Kallyan Samity

Career statistics
Competition	Test	ODI
Matches	11	16
Runs scored	518	309
Batting average	23.54	19.31
100s/50s	1/2	0/2
Top score	121	58
Catches/stumpings	2/–	2/–
- Source: CricInfo, 8 May 2022

Mohammad Nafees Iqbal Khan (Bengali: মোহাম্মদ নাফিস ইকবাল খান; born 31 January 1985), better known as Nafees Iqbal, is a former Bangladeshi international cricketer. He played as a right-handed opening batsman, and was a part-time right-arm medium pace bowler.

== Biography ==
Nafees Iqbal Khan was born to footballer Iqbal Khan and mother Nusrat Iqbal Khan, in the port city of Chittagong. His paternal Khan family is a prestigious family in the city, migrated from Bihar. Nafees Iqbal is the elder brother of Tamim Iqbal and the nephew of former Bangladesh captain Akram Khan, who both played Test cricket for Bangladesh.

== Career ==
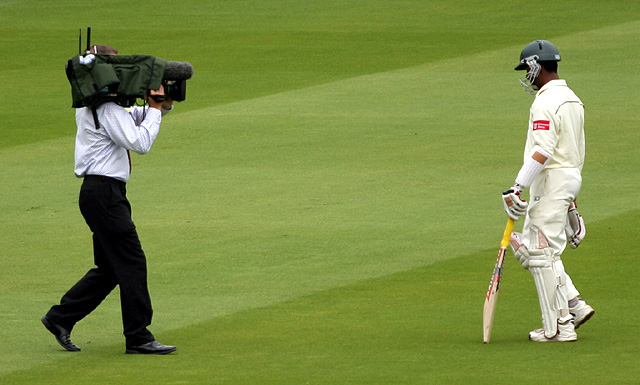
Iqbal walks back after being dismissed vs England at Lord's (2005)

He represented the Bangladesh U19 team at youth level and captained the national team at the 2002 Under-19 Cricket World Cup.

He came into the limelight after scoring a hundred (118 off 168 balls) for Bangladesh A against the touring England team in 2003–04 and was disparaging towards the England spinners he faced, calling them "ordinary". His comments drew more press attention than his batting. He also played for Bangladesh during the 2004 ICC Champions Trophy.

His only Test century, in January 2005, aided Bangladesh towards their first-ever series victory, 1–0 against Zimbabwe. However he couldn't achieve better milestones like his brother Tamim Iqbal during his short playing career and was dropped from the national team in 2006 following a string of poor scores. His last international match, in April 2006, was a test match against Australia. In 2020, one of the friends of Nafees Iqbal revealed that Tamim Iqbal's success was primarily due to the sacrifice of his elder brother Nafees.

In 2016, he was appointed as team manager of Khulna Titans in the Bangladesh Premier League. Nafees was recruited in by the management team of the Mumbai Indians for the 2018 Indian Premier League season as a translator for his fellow Bangladeshi seamer Mustafizur Rahman. His role as a translator was also credited in the 2019 Netflix original webseries Cricket Fever: Mumbai Indians.

== Personal life ==
He is the elder brother of cricketer Tamim Iqbal and the nephew of former cricketer Akram Khan. On 20 June 2020, he was reportedly tested positive for COVID-19 and has been kept in self isolation at his residence in Chittagong.
