= Rafikul Khan =

Bangladeshi cricketer (born 1977)

Personal information
- Full name: Mohammad Rafikul Islam Khan
- Born: November 7, 1977 (age 49); Rajshahi, Bangladesh
- Batting: Right-handed

International information
- National side: Bangladesh
- Only Test (cap 29): 25 October 2002 v South Africa
- Only ODI (cap 63): 9 October 2002 v South Africa

Career statistics
Competition	Tests	ODIs
Matches	1	1
Runs scored	7	–
Batting average	3.50	–
100s/50s	0/0	–
Top score	6	–
Balls bowled	0	–
Wickets	–	–
Bowling average	–	–
5 wickets in innings	–	–
10 wickets in match	–	–
Best bowling	–	–
Catches/stumpings	0/–	–/–
- Source: ESPNcricinfo, 12 February 2006

Mohammad Rafikul Islam Khan (born 7 November 1977, in Rajshahi), generally known as Rafikul Khan, is a Bangladeshi former cricketer who played one Test and one ODI match for Bangladesh in 2002. He played domestic first-class cricket for Rajshahi Division.

He retired in 2008 after for more than a decade in club and first-class cricket, in addition to his brief international career in late 2002.
