= Mohammad Salim =

Bangladeshi cricketer (born 1981)

Personal information
- Born: 15 October 1981 (age 45); Ferryghat, Khulna, Bangladesh
- Batting: Right-handed

International information
- National side: Bangladesh
- Test debut (cap 31): 24 April 2003 v South Africa
- Last Test: 1 May 2003 v South Africa
- Only ODI (cap 66): 17 April 2003 v South Africa

Career statistics
Competition	Test	ODI
Matches	2	1
Runs scored	49	9
Batting average	16.33	9.00
100s/50s	0/0	0/0
Top score	26	9
Catches/stumpings	3/1	1/–
- Source: ESPN Cricinfo, 12 February 2006

Mohammad Salim (Bengali: মোহাম্মদ সেলিম, born 15 October 1981) is a Bangladeshi former cricketer who played in two Test matches and one One Day International in 2003. He was born in Khulna.
