= Mazharul Haque (cricketer) =

Bangladeshi cricketer (1980–2013)

Personal information
- Born: 3 July 1980; Narayanganj, Dhaka, Bangladesh
- Died: 3 April 2013 (aged 32); Narayanganj, Dhaka, Bangladesh
- Batting: Right-handed
- Bowling: Right-arm offbreak

International information
- National side: Bangladesh
- Only ODI (cap 60): 19 September 2002 v Australia
- ODI shirt no.: 15
- Source: ESPNcricinfo, 13 February 2006

Mohammad Mazharul Haque Chowdhuri (3 July 1980 – 3 April 2013) was a Bangladeshi cricketer who played in one One Day International in 2002. He was born in Narayanganj, Dhaka, and also died there, aged only 32, of a heart attack.
