= Pedro Collins =

West Indian cricketer (born 1976)

Personal information
- Full name: Pedro Tyrone Collins
- Born: August 12, 1976 (age 50); Boscobelle, Saint Peter, Barbados
- Batting: Right-handed
- Bowling: Left-arm fast medium
- Role: Bowler
- Relatives: Fidel Edwards (half-brother)

International information
- National side: West Indies (1999–2006)
- Test debut (cap 225): 5 March 1999 v Australia
- Last Test: 30 June 2006 v India
- ODI debut (cap 98): 19 October 1999 v Pakistan
- Last ODI: 22 May 2005 v Pakistan

Domestic team information
- Years: Team
- 1996–2012: Barbados
- 2007-2009: Surrey
- 2010: Middlesex

Career statistics
Competition	Test	ODI	FC	LA
Matches	32	30	148	98
Runs scored	235	30	871	166
Batting average	5.87	4.28	6.50	6.14
100s/50s	0/0	0/0	0/0	0/1
Top score	24	10*	24	55*
Balls bowled	6,265	1,577	25,317	4,717
Wickets	106	39	501	149
Bowling average	34.13	31.07	26.01	23.11
5 wickets in innings	3	1	13	2
10 wickets in match	0	0	0	0
Best bowling	6/53	5/43	6/24	7/11
Catches/stumpings	5/–	8/–	31/–	17/–
- Source: , 03 January 2022

Pedro Tyrone Collins (born 12 August 1976) is a Barbadoan cricketer and coach, who played as a fast bowler for the West Indies.

Collins also featured for Barbados, Surrey and Middlesex in his cricketing career.

== International career ==
As a left-handed seam bowler, Collins shot to fame after getting Sachin Tendulkar out three times and twice for a duck during the 2001-02 India vs West Indies Test series.

He later took 6 for 53, on the 7 June 2004, at Sabina Park in the second test of a two match test series against Bangladesh. Collins' feats with the ball helped the Windies to win the test and the series by 1-0 margin.

Collins picked up 5–43 against Australia at Adelaide Oval in an ODI match of the 2005–06 VB Series.

On 12 June 2006, Collins collected his 100th wicket in test match cricket by dismissing Yuvraj Singh for two on the first day in the second test against India. He eventually took 4 for 75 on the first day in the said test played at the Beausejour Stadium of the 2006 four match series.

Collins eventually claimed 106 wickets at 34.13 in his test match career. He was later selected to be part of the Windies 2007 World Twenty20 squad.

== Domestic career ==
Collins signed for Surrey on 10 October 2007 on a two-year Kolpak deal. He eventually left the club in October 2009.

On 30 March 2010, Middlesex announced his signing for the 2010 season.

== Coaching career ==
Collins attained a level 2 coaching certificate from Cricket Australia and a level 3 coaching certificate from Cricket West Indies. He went on to work as an assistant coach with the Vancouver Knights of the Global T20 Canada, Barbados women's national cricket team together with the St Lucia Zouks of the Caribbean Premier League. Collins later assumed the role of a head coach with the Combined Campuses and Colleges team. He currently works as a cricket coach with the Academy of Sport at the University of the West Indies, Cave Hill Campus.

== Personal life ==
He is the half brother of fellow Barbadian pacer Fidel Edwards. Collins is also a fan of footballer Lionel Messi and FC Barcelona.
