= Sanwar Hossain =

Bangladeshi cricketer (born 1973)

Personal information
- Full name: Mohammad Sanwar Hossain
- Born: 5 August 1973 (age 53); Mymensingh, Bangladesh
- Batting: Right-handed
- Bowling: Right-arm offbreak

International information
- National side: Bangladesh
- Test debut (cap 20): 18 December 2001 v New Zealand
- Last Test: 20 August 2003 v Pakistan
- ODI debut (cap 39): 10 January 1998 v India
- Last ODI: 9 September 2003 v Pakistan
- ODI shirt no.: 9

Career statistics
| Competition | Test | ODI |
|---|---|---|
| Matches | 9 | 27 |
| Runs scored | 345 | 290 |
| Batting average | 19.16 | 11.59 |
| 100s/50s | 0/0 | 0/1 |
| Top score | 49 | 52 |
| Balls bowled | 444 | 383 |
| Wickets | 5 | 10 |
| Bowling average | 62.00 | 32.70 |
| 5 wickets in innings | 0 | 0 |
| 10 wickets in match | 0 | 0 |
| Best bowling | 2/128 | 3/49 |
| Catches/stumpings | 1/– | 11/– |
- Source: ESPNcricinfo, 12 February 2006

Mohammad Sanwar Hossain (Bengali: সানোয়ার হোসেন; born 5 August 1973) is a former Bangladeshi cricketer, who was part of the Bangladesh squad for the 2003 Cricket World Cup.

== History ==
The middle-order batter made his international debut in 1998 against India in an ODI game at Dhaka. He notched up his maiden ODI fifty in 2001 against Zimbabwe. Despite continuous low scores, he was selected for the 2003 ODI World Cup held in South Africa, where he scored just 63 runs in six innings. In a group stage match against Sri Lanka, Charminda Vaas took 4 wickets in an over, with Hossain being the fourth batsman to fall. Hossain scored one half-century in international cricket, against Zimbabwe in 2001.

In July 2003, Hossain was called for throwing in a Test match in Australia, the delivery in question being a delivery in which he "flicks the ball with a backhanded motion". Nevertheless, he was allowed to play in the subsequent One Day International series as it fell within the six weeks in which his bowling action was being reviewed.

In 2004, Hossain began working at Biman Bangladesh Airlines, but in November, he was recalled to the Bangladesh squad for their series against India after getting time off work from the airline to allow him to play.

Hossain retired from first-class cricket in 2005, but in 2015 made an appearance for Mushtaque XI against Jewel XI in a Victory Day Exhibition T20 match.

In 2012, Hossain was invited to present trophies at the Kuwait Cricket T20 Premier League Division-2 cricket tournament, and was also responsible for helping to create the 4H Group Cricket Tournament for academies, along with former Bangladeshi cricketers Habibul Bashar, Javed Omar, and Hasanuzzaman.

Hossain has been a coach of, and also managed, the Dhaka Gladiators in the Bangladesh Premier League; in 2013, Hossain was accused of match-fixing during the 2013 Bangladesh Premier League. Gladiators' bowling coach Mohammad Rafique admitted there was match-fixing, and blamed Hossain.
