= Fahim Muntasir =

Bangladeshi cricketer (born 1980)

Personal information
- Born: 1 November 1980 (age 46); Mymensingh, Bangladesh
- Batting: Right-handed
- Bowling: Right-arm offbreak

International information
- National side: Bangladesh
- Test debut (cap 21): 9 January 2002 v Pakistan
- Last Test: 28 July 2002 v Sri Lanka
- ODI debut (cap 53): 23 November 2001 v Zimbabwe
- Last ODI: 23 September 2002 v New Zealand
- Source: , 12 February 2006

Fahim Muntasir Rahman (born 1 November 1980) is a former Bangladeshi cricketer who played in three Test matches and three One Day Internationals from 2001 to 2002.
