= Jamaluddin Ahmed =

Bangladeshi cricketer (born 1977)

Personal information
- Born: 5 January 1977 (age 49); Jessore, Khulna, Bangladesh
- Batting: Right-handed
- Bowling: Right-arm offbreak

International information
- National side: Bangladesh
- Only ODI (cap 68): 7 November 2003 v England

Career statistics
| Competition | ODI | FC |
|---|---|---|
| Matches | 1 | 64 |
| Runs scored | 18 | 3,046 |
| Batting average | – | 31.08 |
| 100s/50s | 0/0 | 4/15 |
| Top score | 18* | 121 |
| Balls bowled | 24 | 10,117 |
| Wickets | 0 | 141 |
| Bowling average | – | 29.89 |
| 5 wickets in innings | – | 4 |
| 10 wickets in match | – | 1 |
| Best bowling | – | 8/67 |
| Catches/stumpings | 1/– | 42/– |
- Source: Cricinfo, 5 November 2016

Jamaluddin Ahmed (born 5 January 1977) is a Bangladeshi former cricketer who played in one One Day International in 2003.

A middle-order batsman and off-spin bowler, he played first-class cricket for Khulna Division from 2001 to 2008. His first ever century (121) helped Khulna win the final of the National Cricket League in 2002–03, and won him the man of the match award. He took his best innings and match bowling figures against Barisal Division in 2005-06: 8 for 67 and 3 for 45.
