= Anwar Hossain (cricketer) =

Bangladeshi cricketer (born 1983)

Personal information
- Born: 10 December 1983 (age 42); Lalbagh, Dhaka, Bangladesh
- Nickname: Piju
- Batting: Right-handed
- Role: Wicket-Keeper

International information
- National side: Bangladesh
- Only Test (cap 30): 8 December 2002 v West Indies
- Only ODI (cap 65): 3 December 2002 v West Indies
- ODI shirt no.: 22

Domestic team information
- Years: Team
- 2000–2001: Dhaka Metropolis
- 2001–2011: Dhaka Division

Career statistics
Competition	Test	ODI	FC	LA
Matches	1	1	71	22
Runs scored	14	42	2339	817
Batting average	7.00	42.00	20.33	43.00
100s/50s	0/0	0/0	3/9	1/5
Top score	12	42	145	113*
Catches/stumpings	0/–	0/–	152/12	9/5
- Source: ESPNcricinfo, 4 November 2025

Mohammad Anwar Hossain (born 10 December 1983) is a Bangladeshi former cricketer who played in one Test match and one One Day International in 2002.
