= Mohammad Nazmul Hossain =

Bangladeshi cricketer (born 1987)

Nazmul Hossain
Personal information
- Full name: Mohammed Nazmul Hossain
- Born: 5 October 1987 (age 39); Habiganj, Bangladesh
- Height: 5 ft 11 in (180 cm)
- Batting: Right-handed
- Bowling: Right-arm fast-medium
- Role: Bowler

International information
- National side: Bangladesh (2004–2012)
- Test debut (cap 40): 17 December 2004 v India
- Last Test: 17 December 2011 v Pakistan
- ODI debut (cap 75): 12 September 2004 v South Africa
- Last ODI: 22 March 2012 v Pakistan
- ODI shirt no.: 90
- T20I debut (cap 24): 2 August 2009 v West Indies
- Last T20I: 25 July 2012 v Netherlands

Domestic team information
- Years: Team
- 2004–2015: Sylhet Division
- 2013: Sylhet Royals

Career statistics
Competition	Test	ODI	FC	LA
Matches	2	38	52	69
Runs scored	16	35	610	143
Batting average	8.00	4.37	10.51	7.94
100s/50s	0/0	0/0	0/0	0/0
Top score	8*	6*	49	28*
Balls bowled	329	1,649	6,312	2,827
Wickets	5	44	96	72
Bowling average	38.80	31.50	30.72	31.63
5 wickets in innings	0	0	2	0
10 wickets in match	0	0	0	0
Best bowling	2/61	4/40	5/30	4/40
Catches/stumpings	0/–	6/–	20/–	11/–
Medal record
Men's Cricket
Representing Bangladesh
ACC Asia Cup
Runner-up	2012 Bangladesh
Asian Games
Gold medal – first place	2010 Guangzhou	Team
- Source: ESPNcricinfo, 14 June 2024

Mohammad Nazmul Hossain (born 5 October 1987) is a Bangladeshi former cricketer. He was born in Habiganj, Bangladesh.

Nazmul Hossain was part of the 13-man Bangladesh squad that won the cricket tournament at the 2010 Asian Games in late November that year. They faced Afghanistan in the final and won by five wickets, securing the country's first gold medal at the Asian Games.
