= Faisal Hossain =

Bangladeshi cricketer (born 1978)

Personal information
- Full name: Faisal Hossain
- Born: 26 October 1978 (age 48); Chittagong, Bangladesh
- Nickname: Decans
- Batting: Left-handed
- Bowling: Left-arm spin

International information
- National side: Bangladesh
- Only Test (cap 36): 28 May 2004 v West Indies
- ODI debut (cap 72): 19 May 2004 v West Indies
- Last ODI: 16 July 2010 v Ireland

Domestic team information
- Years: Team
- 2001/02–present: Chittagong Division

Career statistics
Competition	Test	ODI	FC	LA
Matches	1	6	114	106
Runs scored	7	43	6,657	2,668
Batting average	3.50	10.75	38.25	29.97
100s/50s	0/0	0/0	10/32	0/20
Top score	5	17	180	93
Balls bowled	–	–	6,311	1,956
Wickets	–	–	84	53
Bowling average	–	–	42.45	28.69
5 wickets in innings	–	–	2	2
10 wickets in match	–	–	0	0
Best bowling	–	–	5/36	5/23
Catches/stumpings	0/–	2/–	88/2	43/–
Medal record
Representing Bangladesh
Men's Cricket
Asian Games
Gold medal – first place	2010 Guangzhou	Team
- Source: ESPNcricinfo, 21 July 2021

Faisal Hossain (born 26 October 1978) is a Bangladeshi former cricketer. He played international cricket for Bangladesh in 2004, playing only one Test match and four One Day Internationals without establishing himself in the team. After poor performances at international level, Hossain drifted out of the international squad. He represented Chittagong Division in Bangladesh's domestic competition. Although primarily a batsman, Hossain was a part-time left arm spin bowler. He is currently active as a cricket coach.

== Career ==
Hossain made his One Day International (ODI) debut against the West Indies on 18 May 2004, scoring 17 runs batting at number five. He played three more ODIs, the last on 29 July 2004 against Pakistan where he scored 17 which remained his highest score in international cricket.

He made his Test debut on 28 May 2004 against the West Indies, batting at number six where scored 5 and 2.

Although he was drafted in as cover for the injured captain, Habibul Bashar, in the ICC Champions Trophy in August 2004, Hossain did not play another international match.

Hossain's bowling action came under scrutiny in 2007 and was under suspicion of throwing. He was allowed to bowl in competitive cricket under supervision, but faced a life ban after his action was reported again. He has not bowled since the 2007/08 season. In the 2008 English cricket season, Hossain represented Chislehurst and West Kent Cricket Club in the Kent Cricket League in England.

In December 2008, Hossain was recalled to the Bangladesh squad to face Sri Lanka at home four years after playing his last Test. At the time of his selection, Hossain was a prolific run-scorer in Bangladesh's 2008/09 first-class competition. He scored 983 runs at an average of 70.56. Playing for the Chittagong Division, he scored bulk of runs for his team which also contains experienced national team players like Aftab Ahmed, Nafees Iqbal, Tamim Iqbal, Talha Jubair and Nazimuddin. After another successful season in 2009–10 where he was the 2nd highest run scorer in the domestic league in four-day matches, he got into the one-day team again for Bangladesh's tour to England. He went on to play 2 one-day matches and scored his highest score (26*) in ODI cricket. He was involved in an incident when he was bowling in the 1st ODI. A crafty left-arm spinner, he was bowling to Ian Bell and beat him with his flight. Wicketkeeper and then vice-captain of Bangladesh Mushfiqur Rahim also missed the flight of the ball and the ball went through his helmet grills and stuck him in the nose. Rahim missed the remainder of the series due to the injury. However, he was dropped for the 2nd one-day which Bangladesh won, beating England by 5 runs. Bangladesh went on to lose the series 2–1. His next assignment was against Ireland where he came to bat at No.8 and scored an unbeaten 8*. Bangladesh, down 1–0 against Ireland, came back well and drew the series 1–1. After the England tour, Hossain was dropped from the Bangladesh setup. He went back to domestic cricket and kept on scoring runs. In the 2010–11, he was one of the most consistent performers in the league and earned a place in the Bangladesh A team which will tour South Africa in January 2012.
