= Neeyamur Rashid =

Bangladeshi cricketer (born 1975)

Personal information
- Born: 1 January 1975 (age 51); Pabna, Rajshahi, Bangladesh
- Batting: Right-handed
- Bowling: Right-arm medium-fast

International information
- National side: Bangladesh
- ODI debut (cap 48): 25 March 1999 v Zimbabwe
- Last ODI: 31 May 1999 v Pakistan
- ODI shirt no.: 7

Career statistics
Competition	FC	ODI
Matches	37	2
Runs scored	1,064	5
Batting average	22.16	5.00
100s/50s	0/7	0/0
Top score	72	4*
Balls bowled	3,483	78
Wickets	64	1
Bowling average	24.70	66.00
5 wickets in innings	0	0
10 wickets in match	0	0
Best bowling	4/59	1/46
Catches/stumpings	24/–	1/–
- Source: ESPNcricinfo, 3 February 2021

Neeyamur Rashid Rahul, also known as Niamur Rashid, (Bengali: নিয়ামুর রশিদ রাহুল; born 1 January 1975) is a former Bangladeshi cricketer who played in two One Day Internationals in 1999. After his retirement from cricket, he became a match referee.

== Playing career ==
In 1999, he made his ODI debut against Zimbabwe. He was also a part of the playing XI of Bangladesh's famous victory over Pakistan in the 1999 Cricket World Cup, which was his last match in international cricket.

== Career as a match referee ==
After retiring from cricket, he became a match referee. He first officiated as a match referee in the 2020 Nepal Tri-Nation Series, officiating all 6 matches of the tournament.

Due to the COVID-19 pandemic, the ICC rescinded its decision to use neutral match referees, instead allowing local match officials to officiate in international cricket. Subsequently, he was named as the match referee for all matches played between Bangladesh and the West Indies in 2020-21. Thus, he became the first Bangladeshi match referee to officiate in test matches.

In January 2023, he was named as one of the match referees for the 2023 ICC Under-19 Women's T20 World Cup.
