= Anwar Hossain Monir =

Bangladeshi cricketer (born 1981)

Personal information
- Born: 31 December 1981 (age 44); Munshiganj, Bangladesh
- Batting: Right-handed
- Bowling: Right-arm fast-medium

International information
- National side: Bangladesh
- Test debut (cap 32): 25 July 2003 v Australia
- Last Test: 3 June 2005 v England
- Only ODI (cap 62): 9 October 2002 v South Africa

Career statistics
Competition	Test	ODI
Matches	3	1
Runs scored	22	–
Batting average	7.33	–
100s/50s	0/0	–
Top score	13	–
Balls bowled	348	48
Wickets	0	0
Bowling average	–	–
5 wickets in innings	–	–
10 wickets in match	–	–
Best bowling	–	–
Catches/stumpings	0/–	0/–
- Source: CricInfo, 13 February 2017

Mohammad Anwar Hossain (Bengali: আনোয়ার হোসেন মনির; born 31 December 1981) is a Bangladeshi cricketer who has played in three Test matches and one One Day International since 2003. In the course of his short Test career he took over the record for the most runs conceded by a bowler (307) without taking a wicket.
