= Tareq Aziz =

Bangladeshi cricketer (born 1983)

Tareq Aziz Khan
Personal information
- Full name: Mohammad Tareq Aziz Khan
- Born: 4 September 1983 (age 43); Rajbari, Bangladesh

International information
- National side: Bangladesh (2002–2004)
- Test debut (cap 37): 28 May 2004 v West Indies
- Last Test: 19 October 2004 v New Zealand
- ODI debut (cap 56): 22 January 2002 v Pakistan
- Last ODI: 29 July 2004 v Pakistan

Career statistics
Competition	Test	ODI	FC	LA
Matches	3	10	69	56
Runs scored	22	26	819	129
Batting average	11.00	26.00	14.12	8.60
100s/50s	0/0	0/0	0/0	0/0
Top score	10*	11*	39	24
Balls bowled	360	360	11,031	2,448
Wickets	1	13	226	72
Bowling average	261.00	32.61	26.90	29.11
5 wickets in innings	0	0	9	2
10 wickets in match	0	0	1	0
Best bowling	1/76	3/19	6/46	4/32
Catches/stumpings	1/–	4/–	42/–	18/–
- Source: CricInfo, 12 February 2014

Tareq Aziz (Bengali: তারেক আজিজ; born 4 September 1983) is a former Bangladeshi international cricketer. He made his international debut for the Bangladesh cricket team in January 2002 against Pakistan.

== Career ==
He made his Twenty20 debut for Khulna Division in the 2010 National Cricket League Twenty20 on 15 April 2010.

Tareq Aziz made his Test debut against West Indies on 1 June 2004.
