= Alamgir Kabir (cricketer) =

Bangladeshi cricketer (born 1981)

Mohammad Alamgir Kabir
Personal information
- Born: January 10, 1981 (age 45); Chapai Nawabganj, Bangladesh
- Batting: Right-handed
- Bowling: Right-arm medium-fast

International information
- National side: Bangladesh (2002–2004)
- Test debut (cap 22): 21 July 2002 v Sri Lanka
- Last Test: 26 February 2004 v Zimbabwe

Career statistics
Competition	Test	First-class
Matches	3	38
Runs scored	8	413
Batting average	2.00	8.60
100s/50s	0/0	0/0
Top score	4	27*
Balls bowled	261	5,812
Wickets	0	126
Bowling average	–	26.65
5 wickets in innings	–	5
10 wickets in match	–	0
Best bowling	–	6/71
Catches/stumpings	0/–	11/–
- Source: CricInfo, 25 May 2023

Mohammad Alamgir Kabir (born 10 January 1981) is a Bangladeshi former cricketer who played in three Test matches for Bangladesh from 2002 to 2004. He was the first Bangladeshi Test cricketer to have made a pair on test debut.
