= Mushfiqur Rahman =

Bangladeshi cricketer (born 1980)

Personal information
- Born: 1 January 1980 (age 46); Rajshahi, Bangladesh
- Batting: Right-handed
- Bowling: Right-arm fast-medium

International information
- National side: Bangladesh (2000–2004)
- Test debut (cap 15): 19 April 2001 v Zimbabwe
- Last Test: 10 December 2004 v India
- ODI debut (cap 50): 30 May 2000 v India
- Last ODI: 27 December 2004 v India
- ODI shirt no.: 22 (previously 7)

Domestic team information
- Years: Team
- 2000/01–2008/09: Rajshahi Division

Career statistics
Competition	Test	ODI	FC	LA
Matches	10	28	66	81
Runs scored	232	360	2,448	1230
Batting average	13.64	16.36	25.50	23.20
100s/50s	0/0	0/0	1/17	0/4
Top score	46*	49	115	67
Balls bowled	1,365	1332	7320	3384
Wickets	13	19	133	84
Bowling average	63.30	51.73	28.20	28.73
5 wickets in innings	0	0	3	0
10 wickets in match	0	0	0	0
Best bowling	4/65	2/21	5/40	4/27
Catches/stumpings	6/–	6/–	35/–	29/–
- Source: CricketArchive

Mushfiqur Rahman (Bengali: মুশফিকুর রহমান; born 1 January 1980) is a Bangladeshi former cricketer who played ten Test matches and 28 One Day Internationals for Bangladesh between 2000 and 2004. Mushfiqur Rahman played first-class cricket for Rajshahi.

His performance during the 2003 Test series against England won him the Man of the Series award.
