= Talha Jubair =

Bangladeshi cricketer (born 1985)

Personal information
- Born: 10 December 1985 (age 40); Faridpur, Dhaka, Bangladesh
- Batting: Right-handed
- Bowling: Right-arm medium

International information
- National side: Bangladesh
- Test debut (cap 25): 21 July 2002 v Sri Lanka
- Last Test: 17 December 2004 v India
- ODI debut (cap 61): 23 September 2002 v New Zealand
- Last ODI: 22 February 2003 v South Africa
- ODI shirt no.: 69

Career statistics
Competition	Test	ODI
Matches	7	6
Runs scored	52	5
Batting average	6.52	2.50
100s/50s	0/0	0/0
Top score	31	4*
Balls bowled	1,090	204
Wickets	14	6
Bowling average	55.07	42.50
5 wickets in innings	0	0
10 wickets in match	0	0
Best bowling	3/135	4/65
Catches/stumpings	1/–	1/–
- Source: ESPNcricinfo, 12 February 2006

Talha Jubair (Bengali: তালহা জুবায়ের) (born 10 December 1985) is a Bangladeshi cricketer. He played in seven Test matches and six One Day Internationals from 2002 to 2004.

== Record ==
Jubair set a world record for top scoring for his team as a number 11 batsman in the 3rd innings of a Test match (31) and was the first ever batsman from any team to top score for his team when batting at number 11 position in the 3rd innings of a Test match. He scored 31 runs in Bangladesh's second innings when the team was bowled out for just 124 runs against India in 2004. Jubair was only the 6th number 11 batsman in Test history to top-score for his team in a Test innings.
