= Hannan Sarkar =

Bangladeshi cricketer (born 1982)

Personal information
- Born: 1 December 1982 (age 43); Dhaka, Bangladesh
- Batting: Right-handed
- Bowling: Right-arm medium
- Role: Batsman

International information
- National side: Bangladesh (2002–2004)
- Test debut (cap 24): 21 July 2002 v Sri Lanka
- Last Test: 19 October 2004 v New Zealand
- ODI debut (cap 59): 7 August 2002 v Sri Lanka
- Last ODI: 19 May 2004 v West Indies
- ODI shirt no.: 50

Domestic team information
- Years: Team
- 2000–2010: Barisal Division
- 2011: Dhaka Division

Head coaching information
- Years: Team
- 2025: Abahani Limited
- 2025–26: Rajshahi Warriors

Career statistics
| Competition | Test | ODI | FC | LA |
|---|---|---|---|---|
| Matches | 17 | 20 | 92 | 81 |
| Runs scored | 662 | 383 | 4,267 | 1,633 |
| Batting average | 20.06 | 19.14 | 25.24 | 20.67 |
| 100s/50s | 0/5 | 0/3 | 2/29 | 1/12 |
| Top score | 76 | 61 | 121 | 116 |
| Catches/stumpings | 7/– | 8/– | 43/0 | 28/- |
- Source: ESPNcricinfo, 17 April 2025

Hannan Sarkar (Bengali: হান্নান সরকার) (born 1 December 1982) is a former Bangladeshi cricketer who played Tests and ODIs for Bangladesh. He made his Test debut aged only 19 as an opening batsman against Sri Lanka in July 2002.

Along with Sunil Gavaskar, Sarkar is one of two Test cricketers dismissed with the first delivery of a Test match on three occasions. His record is unique in that it was West Indian bowler Pedro Collins who claimed his wicket on each occasion, the second and third in consecutive matches at the end of May and beginning of June 2004. He is also the first batsman to get out on the first delivery of a World Cup match (John Wright of New Zealand got out on the first legitimate delivery of the World Cup opener in 1992 against Australia in Auckland).
