= Javed Omar =

Bangladeshi cricketer

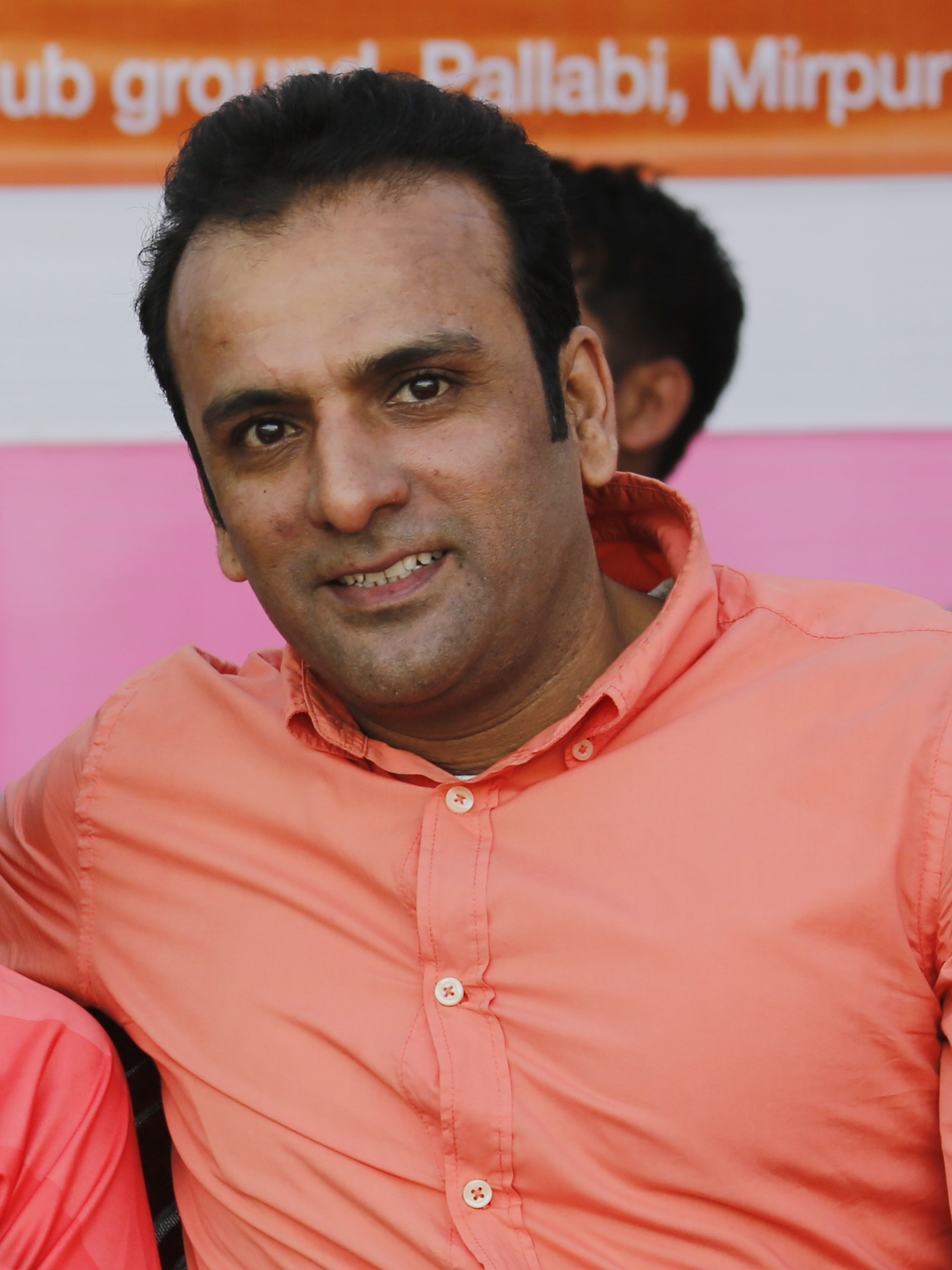
- Omar in 2015

Personal information
- Full name: Mohammad Javed Omar Belim
- Born: 25 November 1976 (age 49); Dhaka, Bangladesh
- Nickname: Gulla
- Height: 5 ft 9 in (1.75 m)
- Batting: Right-handed
- Bowling: Right-arm leg break
- Role: Opening batsman

International information
- National side: Bangladesh (1995-2007)
- Test debut (cap 12): 19 April 2001 v Zimbabwe
- Last Test: 11 July 2007 v Sri Lanka
- ODI debut (cap 25): 5 April 1995 v India
- Last ODI: 25 July 2007 v Sri Lanka
- ODI shirt no.: 5 (previously 3, 2)

Domestic team information
- Years: Team
- 2000–2001: Biman Bangladesh Airlines
- 2001-10: Dhaka Division
- 2011-12: Barisal Division

Career statistics
Competition	Test	ODI	FC	LA
Matches	40	59	102	108
Runs scored	1,720	1,312	5,353	2,381
Batting average	22.05	23.85	28.77	24.29
100s/50s	1/8	0/10	10/24	0/13
Top score	119	85*	173	85*
Balls bowled	6	0	240	240
Wickets	0	–	2	0
Bowling average	–	–	82.50	–
5 wickets in innings	–	–	0	–
10 wickets in match	–	–	0	–
Best bowling	–	–	2/75	–
Catches/stumpings	10/–	12/–	28/–	25/–
- Source: ESPNcricinfo, 2 September 2017

Mohammad Javed Omar Belim (born 25 November 1976), known in the early days of his career by the nickname Gullu is a former Bangladeshi cricketer who has played Tests and ODI cricket since 1995, and a former captain in both formats. He retired from the game after a friendly domestic match on January 3, 2014.

== Career ==
On his Test debut in April 2001, he carried his bat for 85 not out becoming only the third player in history to achieve this on debut. He is the second person in the history to carry the bat through entire innings in both forms of cricket. Moreover, he is one of the twenty two cricketers in the history of 137 years of test cricket who scored half centuries in both innings of a test as a debutant. The opener has gained a reputation for being able to occupy the crease as his Test strike rate of 36 shows. On 28 August 2003, Jawed scored his maiden Test century against Pakistan.

During the second Test between Bangladesh and India in May 2007 he achieved the very rare feat of grabbing a king pair as he got out to the bowling of Zaheer Khan in the first ball of both innings of the Test Match.

== Early years ==
Still in his early teens, Jawed toured England during the summer of 1989 with the Bangladesh U-19 side. Later that year, he played in the Asian U-19 cup in Afghanistan and scored 55 in the match against Pakistan.

The transformation from the youth team to the national side, however, took a bit of time, and it was not until the 1994–95 season that he got his chance in the national colours. This delay was partly because during the period 90–94 Bangladesh was mainly involved with One-Day Cricket while Jawed's batting technique is always more suitable for the longer version. Jawed was part of the team that won the ICC Trophy in 1997. However, he spent most of the tournament as a reserve player, as the coach Gordon Greenidge decided to push hard hitting middle-order bat Naimur Rahman to the opening position.
