= Khaled Mahmud =

Bangladeshi cricketer

Khaled Mahmud Sujon
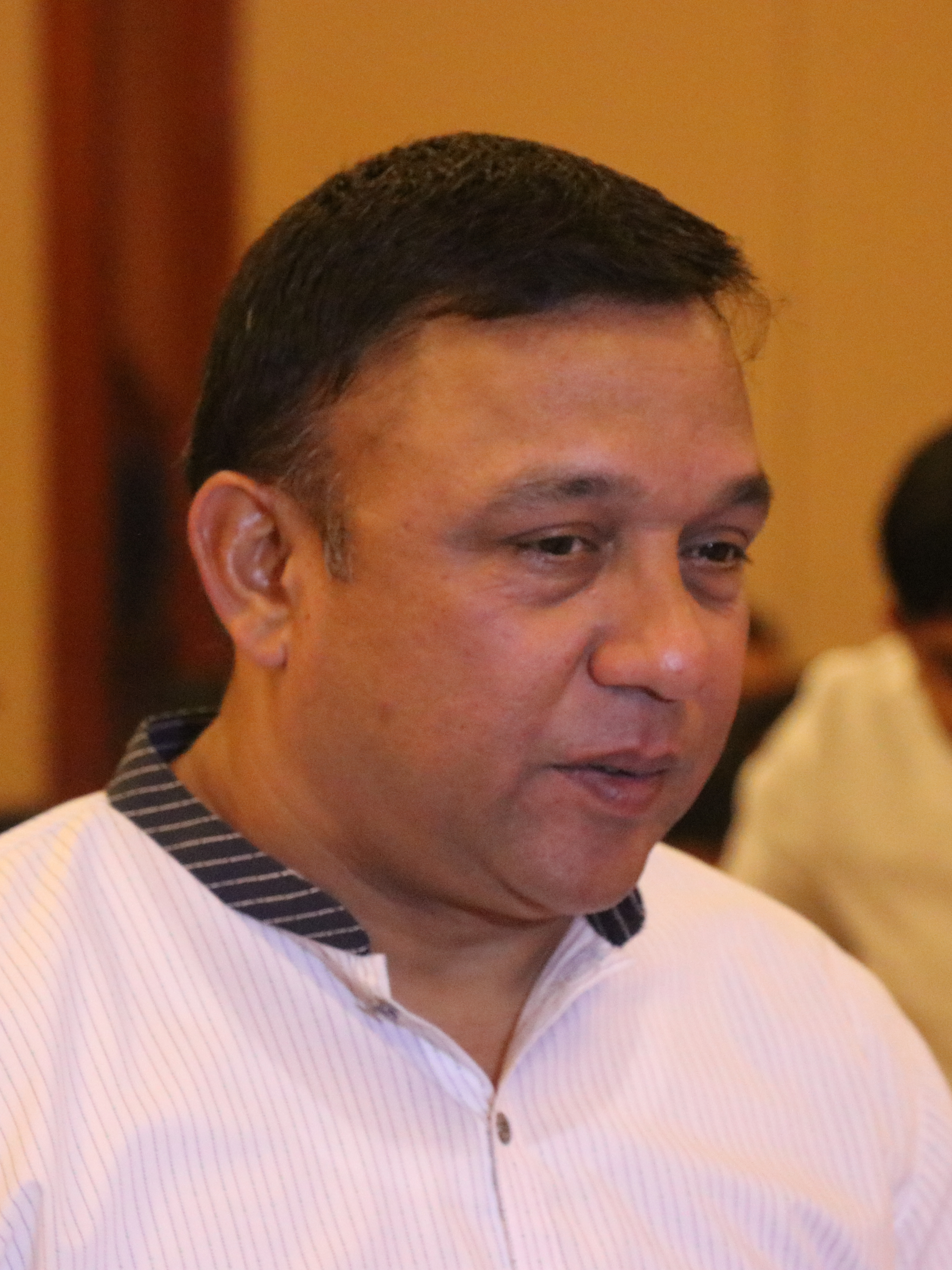
- Khaled Mahmud in 2018

Personal information
- Full name: Khaled Mahmud Sujon
- Born: 26 July 1971 (age 55); Dhaka, Bangladesh
- Height: 1.63 m (5 ft 4 in)
- Batting: Right-handed
- Bowling: Right-arm medium
- Role: Bowling all-rounder

International information
- National side: Bangladesh (1998–2006)
- Test debut (cap 18): 8 November 2001 v Zimbabwe
- Last Test: 29 October 2003 v England
- ODI debut (cap 38): 10 January 1998 v India
- Last ODI: 20 February 2006 v Sri Lanka
- ODI shirt no.: 11 (previously 9)

Domestic team information
- Years: Team
- 2000/01: Dhaka Metropolis
- 2001/02–2005/06: Dhaka Division

Head coaching information
- Years: Team
- 2019: Dhaka Dynamites
- 2019: Bangladesh (interim)
- 2022: Fortune Barishal
- 2023: Khulna Tigers
- 2024: Durdanto Dhaka
- 2025: Dhaka Capitals
- 2026: Noakhali Express

Career statistics
Competition	Test	ODI	FC	LA
Matches	12	77	46	125
Runs scored	266	991	1,767	891
Batting average	12.09	14.36	25.24	19.10
100s/50s	0/0	0/1	1/9	1/3
Top score	45	50	141*	145*
Balls bowled	1620	3385	6,258	5,453
Wickets	13	67	97	144
Bowling average	64.00	42.76	31.58	29.63
5 wickets in innings	0	0	2	2
10 wickets in match	0	0	0	0
Best bowling	4/37	4/19	5/32	5/17
Catches/stumpings	2/–	17/–	21/–	32/–
- Source: CricketArchive, 5 September 2017

Khaled Mahmud Sujon (born 26 July 1971) is a former Bangladeshi cricketer and current head coach of Noakhali Express. He is also a former Test and One Day International captain. A medium-pace bowler and middle-order batsman, he played international cricket for Bangladesh from 1998 to 2006, captaining the team from 2003 to 2004.

== Domestic career ==
He scored his only List A cricket century (145*) against Bhahawalpur where he along with Minhajul Abedin Nannu set the highest 5th wicket stand in List A cricket history (267*).

== International career ==
Mahmud was born in Dhaka. An all-rounder in domestic cricket, his international success was mostly limited to his bowling in One Day Internationals, peaking with the defeat of Pakistan in the 1999 World Cup, when he scored 27 runs and took 3 wickets for 31 runs off 10 overs bowling and won the man of the match award. He took 4 wickets for 37 runs and 3 wickets for 68 runs in the Third Test against Pakistan at Multan in 2003–04.

In October 2005, according to BBC news, Mahmud decided to retire from international cricket, but he denied it as speculation next day.

Mahmud retired from international cricket in 2006, scoring a respectable 36 runs in his final match. He is still the only Bangladeshi cricketer in history to retire from international cricket at the stadium instead of announcing it in social media or press conference.

== Post-playing career ==
Since retirement, Mahmud has held several roles with the Bangladesh Cricket Board (BCB). He was operations manager of the National Cricket Academy prior to being made appointed assistant coach to the national team in 2009. In 2013, he was elected as one of 25 BCB directors. He has also worked as manager of the team, selector and the technical director. He served as team director during the 2023 World Cup.

== Health ==
In July 2017, he suffered a stroke and was taken to Singapore for treatment.

Preceded by Khaled Mashud	Bangladesh national cricket captain 2003–2003/4	Succeeded by Habibul Bashar
