= Tapash Baisya =

Bangladeshi cricketer (born 1982)

Tapash Baishya
Personal information
- Full name: Tapash Kumar Baishya
- Born: 25 December 1982 (age 43); Sylhet, Bangladesh
- Height: 5 ft 9 in (1.75 m)
- Batting: Right-handed
- Bowling: Right-arm fast-medium
- Role: Bowler

International information
- National side: Bangladesh
- Test debut (cap 27): 28 July 2002 v Sri Lanka
- Last Test: 3 June 2005 v England
- ODI debut (cap 58): 4 August 2002 v Sri Lanka
- Last ODI: 31 March 2007 v Australia
- ODI shirt no.: 19 (previously 12)

Career statistics
Competition	Test	ODI	FC
Matches	21	56	85
Runs scored	384	336	1,878
Batting average	11.29	12.00	15.02
100s/50s	0/2	0/0	1/6
Top score	66	35*	112
Balls bowled	3,370	2,608	11,971
Wickets	36	59	192
Bowling average	59.36	41.55	32.37
5 wickets in innings	0	0	3
10 wickets in match	0	0	0
Best bowling	4/72	4/16	6/37
Catches/stumpings	6/–	8/–	28/–
- Source: ESPNcricinfo, 24 July 2020

Tapash Baishya (Bengali: তাপস বৈশ্য) (born 25 December 1982) is a former Bangladeshi international cricketer.

== Domestic career ==
He played first-class cricket for Sylhet Division from 2000–01 to 2012–13. His highest score was 112 off 173 balls, batting at number eight against Chittagong Division in 2006–07. His best bowling figures were 6 for 37 against Dhaka Division in 2012–13.

== International career ==
Tapash Baishya took 36 Test wickets, although they came at a bowling average of nearly 60 runs apiece. Nevertheless, he has taken the third-most wickets of any Bangladeshi fast bowler, behind Mashrafe Mortaza and Shahadat Hossain. He took four wickets in a Test innings only once, four for 72 against the West Indies on their 2002–03 tour of Bangladesh. In his batting career, he scored two Test fifties.
