= Manjural Islam (cricketer) =

Bangladeshi cricketer (born 1979)

Personal information
- Full name: Mohammad Manjural Islam
- Born: 7 November 1979 (age 47); Khulna, Bangladesh
- Nickname: Monju
- Batting: Left-handed
- Bowling: Left–arm Medium fast
- Role: Bowler

International information
- National side: Bangladesh
- Test debut (cap 13): 19 April 2001 v Zimbabwe
- Last Test: 19 February 2004 v Zimbabwe
- ODI debut (cap 45): 16 March 1999 v Pakistan
- Last ODI: 17 April 2003 v South Africa
- ODI shirt no.: 7 (previously 14)

Domestic team information
- Years: Team
- 2000/01–2007/08: Khulna Division
- 2008/09: Dhaka Warriors

Career statistics
Competition	Test	ODI	FC	LA
Matches	17	34	51	77
Runs scored	81	53	386	148
Batting average	3.68	5.88	7.01	6.72
100s/50s	0/0	0/0	0/0	0/0
Top score	21	13	49*	17
Balls bowled	2,970	1,591	7,528	3,577
Wickets	28	24	91	77
Bowling average	57.32	53.50	40.15	32.00
5 wickets in innings	1	0	2	0
10 wickets in match	0	0	0	0
Best bowling	6/81	3/37	6/27	4/41
Catches/stumpings	4/–	8/–	17/–	23/–
- Source: CricketArchive, 13 March 2009

Manjural Islam (sometimes spelled Monjural Islam, born 7 November 1979) is a Bangladeshi former cricketer who played in 17 Test matches and 34 One Day Internationals from 1999 to 2004 as a left-arm seam bowler.

Manjural Islam made his Test debut in April 2001, against Zimbabwe at Bulawayo where he took his best innings figures of 6 for 81. He represented Bangladesh in both the 1999 and the 2003 World Cups.

In 2009 he was one of a number of players who decided to leave Bangladeshi domestic cricket in order to participate in the unsanctioned Indian Cricket League as part of the squad for the new Dhaka Warriors side, for which he was banned from playing in official cricket matches in Bangladesh for 10 years by the Bangladesh Cricket Board.

In October 2020, he was appointed as the chief selector of the Bangladesh women's cricket team.

== See also ==
- List of Bangladesh cricketers who have taken five-wicket hauls on Test debut
