= 2003 TVS Cup Tri Series =

- Date: 11–21 April 2003
- Location: Bangladesh
- Result: Won by India and South Africa
- Player of the series: Alan Dawson (SA)
Teams
| India | Bangladesh | South Africa |
Captains
| Sourav Ganguly | Khaled Mahmud | Graeme Smith |
Most runs
| Sourav Ganguly 177 | Alok Kapali 112 | Neil McKenzie 186 |
Most wickets
| Ajit Agarkar 8 | Alok Kapali 6 | Alan Dawson 11 |

The 2003 TVS Cup (named after sponsor TVS) was a One Day International cricket tournament that was held in Bangladesh from 11 to 21 April 2003. The tournament was played by India, Bangladesh and South Africa. The final between India and South Africa was washed out twice, leaving both finalists to share the trophy.

== Squads ==
| Bangladesh | India | South Africa |
|---|---|---|
| Khaled Mahmud (c); Khaled Mashud (wk); Javed Omar; Mehrab Hossain; Mohammad Ashraful; Habibul Bashar; Akram Khan; Alok Kapali; Tushar Imran; Sanwar Hossain; Mohammad Rafique; Tapash Baisya; Manjural Islam; Tareq Aziz; Talha Jubair | Sourav Ganguly (c); Virender Sehwag; Gautam Gambhir; Mohammad Kaif; Yuvraj Singh; Dinesh Mongia; Parthiv Patel; Sanjay Bangar; Zaheer Khan; Harbhajan Singh; Ajit Agarkar; Amit Mishra; Aavishkar Salvi; Sarandeep Singh; Abhijit Kale | Graeme Smith (c); Paul Adams; Mark Boucher; Alan Dawson; Boeta Dippenaar; Herschelle Gibbs; Andrew Hall; Neil McKenzie; Makhaya Ntini; Robin Peterson; Shaun Pollock; Jacques Rudolph; Charl Willoughby |

== Matches ==
=== Group stage ===
| Pos | Team | P | W | L | NR | T | Points | NRR | For | Against |
|---|---|---|---|---|---|---|---|---|---|---|
| 1 | India | 4 | 3 | 1 | 0 | 0 | 18 | +1.930 | 1006 (192.5 overs) | 653 (198.4 overs) |
| 2 | South Africa | 4 | 3 | 1 | 0 | 0 | 17 | +0.151 | 925 (198.4 overs) | 901 (200 overs) |
| 3 | Bangladesh | 4 | 0 | 4 | 0 | 0 | 1 | –2.078 | 662 (200 overs) | 1039 (192.5 overs) |

| = Qualified for Finals | = Did not qualify |

11 April 2003
day/night
Scorecard

| India; 276 (49.3 overs) | v | Bangladesh; 76 (27.3 overs) |
| Yuvraj Singh 102*(85); Tapash Baisya 3/65 (10 overs) | | Mohammad Rafique 18(21); Zaheer Khan 4/19 (7.3 overs) |

India won by 200 runs
Bangabandhu National Stadium, Dhaka
Umpires: Aleem Dar (PAK) and Mahbubur Rahman (BAN)
Player of the match: Yuvraj Singh

- Points: India 6, Bangladesh 0.
- India won the toss and elected to bat.
- Gautam Gambhir, Aavishkar Salvi (Both Ind) made their ODI debuts.
- Yuvraj Singh (Ind) scored his first century in ODIs.

13 April 2003
day/night
Scorecard

| India; 307/4 (50 overs) | v | South Africa; 154 (34.5 overs) |
| Mohammad Kaif 95 (103); Alan Dawson 2/46 (10 overs) | | Mark Boucher 48 (59); Virender Sehwag 3/28 (3.5 overs) |

India won by 153 runs
Bangabandhu National Stadium, Dhaka
Umpires: AFM Akhtaruddin (BAN) and Billy Bowden (NZ)
Player of the match: Mohammad Kaif

- Points: India 6, South Africa 0.
- India won the toss and elected to bat.
- Amit Mishra (Ind) and Jacques Rudolph (SA) both made their ODI debuts.

14 April 2003
day/night
Scorecard

| South Africa; 294/3 (50 overs) | v | Bangladesh; 211 (49.3 overs) |
| Boeta Dippenaar 66 (81); Mohammad Rafique 2/43 (10 overs) | | Mohammad Ashraful 52(93); Shaun Pollock 4/36 (9.3 overs) |

South Africa won by 83 runs
Bangabandhu National Stadium, Dhaka
Umpires: Aleem Dar (PAK) and Mahbubur Rahman (BAN)
Player of the match: Mohammad Ashraful

- Points: South Africa 6, Bangladesh 0.
- South Africa won the toss and elected to bat.

16 April 2003
day/night
Scorecard

| Bangladesh; 207 (49.4 overs) | v | India; 208/6 (42.5 overs) |
| Habibul Bashar 50 (94); Ajit Agarkar 3/36 (10 overs) | | Gautam Gambhir 71 (89); Alok Kapali 2/41 (8 overs) |

India won by 4 wickets (with 43 balls remaining)
Bangabandhu National Stadium, Dhaka
Umpires: Billy Bowden (NZ) and Mahbubur Rahman (BAN)
Player of the match: Gautam Gambhir

- Points: India 5, Bangladesh 1
- Bangladesh won the toss and elected to bat.
- Virender Sehwag (Ind) captained India for the first time in ODIs.

17 April 2003
day/night
Scorecard

| South Africa; 261/5 (50 overs) | v | Bangladesh; 168 (49 overs) |
| Jacques Rudolph 81 (113); Alok Kapali 2/40 (10 overs) | | Alok Kapali 71 (101); Shaun Pollock 3/17 (7 overs) |

South Africa won by 93 runs
Bangabandhu National Stadium, Dhaka
Umpires: AFM Akhtaruddin (BAN) and Aleem Dar (PAK)
Player of the match: Shaun Pollock

- Points: South Africa 6, Bangladesh 0.
- South Africa won the toss and elected to bat.

18 April 2003
day/night
Scorecard

| India; 215 (49.1 overs) | v | South Africa; 216/5 (48.4 overs) |
| Sourav Ganguly 61 (83); Alan Dawson 4/49 (9.1 overs) | | Neil McKenzie 80 (107); Harbhajan Singh 3/43 (10 overs) |

South Africa won by 5 wickets (with 8 balls remaining)
Bangabandhu National Stadium, Dhaka
Umpires: AFM Akhtaruddin (BAN) and Billy Bowden (NZ)
Player of the match: Neil McKenzie

- Points: South Africa 5, India 1.
- India won the toss and elected to bat.

=== Final ===
20 April 2003
Scorecard

| India | v | South Africa |

Match abandoned
Bangabandhu National Stadium, Dhaka
Umpires: A. F. M. Akhtaruddin (Ban) and Billy Bowden (NZ)

- No toss.
- Match abandoned without a ball bowled due to rain.
- Match was moved to reserve day (21 April 2003).

(Reserve day)
21 April 2003
Scorecard

| India; 46/3 (17.1 overs) | v | South Africa |
| Sourav Ganguly 11* (36); Makhaya Ntini 2/26 (8 overs) |

No result
Bangabandhu National Stadium, Dhaka
Umpires: Aleem Dar (Pak) and Mahbubur Rahman (Ban)

- India won the toss and elected to bat.
- Rain stopped play at the 18th over of the 1st innings (India 46/3), soaked outfield prevented any further play.
- India and South Africa shared trophy.
