= Neil Plummer =

Australian cricketer

Personal information
- Full name: Neil Robert Plummer
- Born: 6 July 1955 (age 71); Lobethal, South Australia
- Batting: Left-handed
- Bowling: Right-arm off-spin

Domestic team information
- Years: Team
- 1985/86–1989/90: South Australia
- Source: CricketArchive, 18 April 2016

Neil Robert Plummer (born 6 July 1955) is a former Australian cricketer who represented South Australia in the late 1980s. He bowled right-arm off-spin and batted left-handed.

Plummer made his first-class debut in February 1986, in a Sheffield Shield match against Victoria at Adelaide Oval. He took only a single wicket on debut (that of Jamie Siddons), but had greater success while batting, making 49 and 42 from eighth in the batting order. In the second innings he was South Australia's top-scorer. Plummer was not retained for his team's next match, against Western Australia, and did not return until the following season, when he took three wickets ( against New South Wales at the Sydney Cricket Ground. During the 1987–88 season, he made two appearances, against Victoria and Tasmania, but did not take a wicket in either. Plummer's final first-class appearance came against New South Wales in February 1990, where he was once again wicketless.
