= Bangladesh national cricket team =

Men's Cricket Team representing Bangladesh

Bangladesh
- Nickname: The Tigers
- Association: Bangladesh Cricket Board

Personnel
- Test captain: Najmul Hossain Shanto
- One Day captain: Litton Das
- T20I captain: Litton Das
- Coach: Phil Simmons
- Batting coach: Mohammad Ashraful
- Bowling coach: Talha Jubair (Pace); Mushtaq Ahmed (Spin)

History
- Test status acquired: 2000

International Cricket Council
- ICC status: Associate Member (1977); Full member (2000)
- ICC region: Asia
ICC Rankings	Current	Best-ever
Test	8th	6th (23 August 2026)
ODI	9th	6th (25 May 2017)
T20I	8th	4th (22 July 2012)

Tests
- First Test: v. India at National Stadium, Dhaka; 10–13 November 2000
- Last Test: v. West Indies at Wanderers Stadium, Johannesburg; 15–19 November 2026
Tests	Played	Won/Lost
Total	165	28/117 (22 draws)
This year	9	3/5 (1 draw)
- World Test Championship appearances: 3 (first in 2021)
- Best result: 7th place (2025)

One Day Internationals
- First ODI: v. Pakistan at Tyronne Fernando Stadium, Moratuwa; 31 March 1986
- Last ODI: v. Afghanistan at Sharjah Cricket Stadium, Sharjah; 21 October 2026
ODIs	Played	Won/Lost
Total	469	170/288 (1 tie, 10 no results)
This year	14	7/7 (0 ties, 0 no results)
- World Cup appearances: 7 (first in 1999)
- Best result: Quarter-finals (2015)
- World Cup Qualifier appearances: 6 (first in 1979)
- Best result: Champions (1997)

T20 Internationals
- First T20I: v. Zimbabwe at Khulna Divisional Stadium, Khulna; 28 November 2006
- Last T20I: v. Sri Lanka at Kōrogi Sports Park, Nisshin; 3 October 2026
T20Is	Played	Won/Lost
Total	222	89/128 (0 ties, 5 no results)
This year	10	3/7 (0 ties, 0 no results)
- T20 World Cup appearances: 9 (first in 2007)
- Best result: Super 8s (2007, 2024)
Test kit
ODI kit
T20I kit
- As of 19 November 2026

The Bangladesh men's national cricket team (Bengali: বাংলাদেশ জাতীয় ক্রিকেট দল), administered by the Bangladesh Cricket Board (BCB), represents Bangladesh in international cricket. They are a full member of the International Cricket Council (ICC) with Test, One-Day International (ODI) and Twenty20 International (T20I) status.

Bangladesh became an associate member of the ICC in 1977, making their first official international appearance at the 1979 ICC Trophy. While football was historically the country's most popular sport, cricket grew in popularity during the late 1990s. The team won the 1997 ICC Trophy, qualifying for their first Cricket World Cup in 1999. At the World Cup, they defeated Scotland and caused a significant upset by defeating Pakistan, a performance that helped accelerate their promotion to full member status. On 26 June 2000, Bangladesh became the 10th Test-playing nation and played their inaugural Test match against India in Dhaka in November of that year.

The team struggled significantly in its early years as a full member, holding the record for the most consecutive losses in Tests (21, between 2001 and 2004) and ODIs (23, between 1999 and 2002). Their maiden Test victory came against Zimbabwe in 2005, and they secured their first overseas Test series victory against the West Indies in 2009. Results have improved over time, particularly at home, with series wins against major cricketing nations including Pakistan, India, South Africa, England, Sri Lanka, New Zealand, and Australia. As of 30 June 2026, Bangladesh has played 159 Tests with 27 wins. In limited-overs cricket, the team has won 169 of 464 ODIs and 87 of 217 T20Is.

In major tournaments, Bangladesh reached the quarter-finals of the 2015 Cricket World Cup and the semi-finals of the 2017 Champions Trophy. They are three-time runners-up in the Asia Cup (2012, 2016, and 2018) and reached the final of the 2018 Nidahas Trophy. In 2019, they won their first multi-team tournament, the Ireland Tri-Nation Series.

As of 20 May 2026, the ICC ranks Bangladesh 7th in Tests, 8th in ODIs, and 9th in T20Is.

== History ==
=== 20th century ===
Several East Pakistan-based teams played in Pakistani domestic cricket prior to Bangladesh's declaration of independence in 1971—the East Pakistan cricket team fielded three players who later played ICC Trophy matches. In 1977, Bangladesh became an associate member of the International Cricket Council (ICC). Bangladesh was one of fifteen teams to take part in the inaugural ICC Trophy. Bangladesh, under the captaincy of Raqibul Hasan, won two matches and lost two, but failed to progress beyond the first round. Victory in the South-East Asian Cricket Conference Tournament in February 1984 ensured Bangladesh qualified for the 1986 Asia Cup. On 31 March 1986, Bangladesh played their first One Day International against a full member of the ICC.

31 March 1986
Scorecard

Bangladesh; 94 all out (35.3 overs)	v	Pakistan; 98/3 (32.1 overs)
Shaheedur Rahman 37 (60); Wasim Akram 4/19 (9 overs)		Mudassar Nazar 47 (97); Jahangir Shah 2/23 (9 overs)

Pakistan won by 7 wickets
Tyronne Fernando Stadium, Moratuwa, Sri Lanka
Umpires: Herbi Felsinger (SL) and PW Vidanagamage (SL)
Player of the match: Wasim Akram

Captained by Jayampathi Wickramarathne, Bangladesh was dismissed for 94 runs, and Pakistan reached their target for victory with seven wickets in hand. They lost their second ODI, which was against Sri Lanka, finishing last in the three-team tournament. Bangladesh qualified for the 1988 Asia Cup, this time hosting the tournament; it was the first time ODIs had been staged in the country. Although they lost all their matches, Bangladesh's fixtures were retrospectively awarded ODI. Floods in the preceding months meant the tournament was in doubt, but it went ahead as planned. A charity match raised $70,000 for the flood victims.

Bangladesh took part in the 1990 Austral-Asia Cup, the Asia Cup in 1990–91, 1995, 1997, and several other triangular tournaments. Still, it was not until 1998 that they won their first ODI. Their 22-match losing streak since their first ODI was at the time a record.

16 May 1998
Scorecard

Kenya; 236 all out (49 overs)	v	Bangladesh; 237/4 (48 overs)
Ravi Shah 52 (64); Mohammad Rafique 3/56 (10 overs)		Mohammad Rafique 77 (87); Mohammad Sheikh 2/46 (10 overs)

Bangladesh won by 6 wickets
Lal Bahadur Shastri Stadium, Hyderabad, India
Umpires: SK Sharma (Ind) and C. R. Mohite (Ind)
Player of the match: Mohammad Rafique

Bangladesh posted its first ODI win against Kenya, in India, thanks largely to Mohammad Rafique, who contributed a fiery 77 runs and took 3 wickets. He put on 137 for the first wicket with Athar Ali Khan, whose own contribution was 47.

In October 1998, Bangladesh hosted (but did not participate in) the first ICC KnockOut Trophy ever held, (Note: the event later became the ICC Champions Trophy) a knock-out ODI tournament featuring all the test-playing nations.

Bangladesh took part in each of the 1979, 1982, 1986, 1990, and 1994 editions of the ICC Trophy, and won the trophy in 1997, in the process qualifying for the 1999 World Cup. The general secretary of the Bangladesh Cricket Board, Aminul Huq Moni, took the initiative to install Astro Turf in Abahani Cricket Ground and Bangabandhu National Stadium so that the local players had two full seasons to prepare on the type of pitch they would be playing in ICC Trophy in 1997. Bangladesh also became a regular ICC member with the right to play ODIs and started hosting bilateral and triangular ODI tournaments. Earlier, in February, Dhaka hosted the third and final SAARC cricket tournament. Bangladesh played in its first World Cup in England in 1999 and recorded its first win in a World Cup match against Scotland. Later on, Bangladesh created an enormous upset by beating Pakistan by 62 runs in the group match at Northampton. Bangladesh made 9/223 from its full 50 overs, and in reply, Pakistan could only manage 161 due to timely run-outs by wicket-keeper Khaled Mashud and some tight bowling by Khaled Mahmud, who took 3/31 from 10 overs. Mahmud was judged the man of the match. Bangladesh did not qualify for the Super Six round due to defeats in three of its five matches. However, the win over Pakistan, who finished runners-up to Australia, helped Bangladesh to gain test-playing status the following year. Bangladesh had sacked coach Gordon Greenidge, who had steered the team through the 1997 ICC Trophy and into the 1999 World Cup on the morning of the match.

Former South Africa Test cricketer Eddie Barlow became Bangladesh's coach in 1999. In preparation for becoming a Test-playing country, Bangladesh established its own first-class competition in 1999–2000, although the matches were not given first-class status until the 2000–2001 season. The lack of an established first-class structure in the country until shortly before Bangladesh played its debut Test has been cited as one of the reasons the team struggled to adapt to the longer format of the game. The West Indies toured Bangladesh in October, winning both matches in the ODI series. After suffering a stroke in April 2000, Barlow vacated the position of coach, and Sarwar Imran was handed the coaching job. In May and June 2000, Bangladesh hosted the Asia Cup; Bangladesh lost all three of their matches, and playing against Pakistan, Bangladesh recorded the heaviest defeat in ODIs, a margin of 233 runs at the time. Bangladesh participated in the 2000 ICC KnockOut Trophy in October; their only match ended in defeat by England.

=== First years as a Test team (2000–2003) ===
On 13 November 2000, Bangladesh played their inaugural Test match, hosting India in Dhaka.

10–13 November 2000
Scorecard

Bangladesh	v	India
400 (153.3 Overs); Aminul Islam Bulbul 145 (380); Sunil Joshi 5/142 (45.3 Overs)		429 (141.3 Overs); Sunil Joshi 92 (180); Naimur Rahman 6/132 (44.3 Overs)
91 (46.3 Overs); Habibul Bashar 30 (63); Javagal Srinath 3/19 (11 Overs)		64/1 (15 Overs); Rahul Dravid 41 (49); Hasibul Hossain 1/31 (6 Overs)

India won by 9 wickets
Bangabandhu National Stadium, Dhaka
Umpires: Steve Bucknor (WI) and David Shepherd (ENG)
Player of the match: Sunil Joshi

- Bangladesh won the toss and elected to bat
- Sameen Ishraq, Akram Khan, Al Sahariar, Aminul Islam Bulbul, Habibul Bashar, Khaled Mashud, Mehrab Hossain, Mohammad Rafique, Naimur Rahman, Ranjan Das, Hasibul Hossain and Shahriar Hossain made their Test debuts for Bangladesh.
- Shiv Sunder Das, Saba Karim and Zaheer Khan made their debuts for India.
- Aminul Islam Bulbul became the third cricketer in history to score a century on his country's inaugural test.

The first Test run in the history of Bangladesh Cricket came from the bat of Mehrab Hossain, who also scored the first ODI hundred by an individual player for Bangladesh in 1999. Captained by Naimur Rahman, Bangladesh lost by nine wickets, although Wisden noted that they "surpassed all expectations by matching their neighbours, and at times, even enjoying the upper hand". Aminul Islam Bulbul scored 145 in the first innings, becoming the third person to have scored a century in their team's first Test; Rahman took 6 wickets for 132 runs, the second-best bowling figures in a country's maiden Test. In March 2001, former Australian Test cricketer Trevor Chappell was appointed coach. The following month, Bangladesh embarked on a tour of Zimbabwe to play two Tests and three ODIs. Zimbabwe, who at the time were ranked ninth out of the ten Test teams, won all five matches.

Bangladesh took part in the 2001–02 Asian Test Championship, the second and final time the championship was held and the first the team had been eligible to play in. They lost both their matches by an innings. Mohammad Ashraful made his debut in the series and became the youngest player to score a Test century in his first match.

In November, Bangladesh hosted Zimbabwe for two Tests and three ODIs. The opening Test was curtailed by bad weather and ended in a draw; after losing their first five Tests, it was the first time Bangladesh had avoided defeat. Zimbabwe won all the remaining matches. After the Test series wicketkeeper Khaled Mashud replaced Rahman as captain. The following month Bangladesh toured New Zealand for two Test matches. Bangladesh's batsmen struggled in unfamiliar conditions and the team slumped to two innings defeats.

In January 2002, Bangladesh hosted Pakistan for two Tests and three ODIs where Bangladesh lost all the matches. At this point, they had lost ten of their first eleven Tests; only South Africa had struggled as much in their introduction to Test cricket, also losing ten of their first eleven matches. Chappell blamed Bangladesh's batsmen for the loss, saying "they commit the same mistakes again and again, and need to learn to apply themselves, to bat in sessions". In April, former Pakistan Test cricketer Mohsin Kamal replaced Chappell as coach. When Bangladesh toured Sri Lanka in July and August they were on the receiving end of Sri Lanka's largest margin of victory in Test cricket: an innings and 196 runs. Bangladesh lost both Tests and all three ODIs on the tour, recording their 50th defeat in 53 ODIs. Repeated poor performances prompted people to question whether Bangladesh had been granted Test status too soon. Two defeats against Australia and New Zealand in pool matches knocked Bangladesh out of the 2002 ICC Champions Trophy.

In October, Bangladesh got whitewashed in both Test and ODI series against in South Africa.Wisden noted that "Time and again ... came the mantra that [Bangladesh] would learn from the experience, that they could only improve by playing against the best, that there was genuine talent in the squad. But it wore thin." The final defeat set a record for most consecutive losses in ODIs (23), beating the previous record, which was also held by Bangladesh. When West Indies toured in November and December, Bangladesh lost both Tests and two out of the three ODIs, and one ended in no result. Bangladesh hit several new lows on the third day of the first Test: their lowest innings total (87), their lowest match aggregate (226), and the biggest defeat in their 16 Tests (by an innings and 310 runs).

South Africa hosted the 2003 World Cup in February and March. Bangladesh lost five of their six matches (one ended in no result), including fixtures against Canada, who hadn't played international cricket since the 1979 World Cup, and Kenya, who eventually made the semi-finals of the tournament. In the aftermath of Bangladesh's World Cup campaign, Habibul Bashar replaced Khaled Mashud as captain, and Kamal was sacked as coach with Dav Whatmore taking over the role. Whatmore was not able to begin the job immediately, so Sarwar Imran acted as interim coach during TVS Cup and South Africa's tour of Bangladesh in April and May. Bangladesh lost all four ODIs by large margins and two Tests by innings.

=== Under Dav Whatmore (2003–2007) ===
Bangladesh played two Tests and three ODI matches on a mid-year tour of Australia in 2003.They lost every single match on that tour.

In August 2003, Bangladesh toured Pakistan to play three Tests and five ODIs matches. This was Bangladesh's second tour to Pakistan, with the first occurring in 2001–02, when the teams played one Test match. Both series ended in whitewash, with Pakistan winning the Test series 3 – 0 and the ODI series 5 – 0.

In the first Test match of that series, Alok Kapali became the first Bangladesh player to take a hat-trick in Test cricket, dismissing Shabbir Ahmed, Danish Kaneria, and Umar Gul. However, in the third Test match of that series, Bangladesh came very close to its first Test victory, when it lost to Pakistan by only one wicket. It was just the tenth time in Test history that a team had lost by a single wicket.

In September–October 2003, England played 2 Tests and 3 ODIs against Bangladesh. England won both the Test matches and won all three ODIs by 7 wickets. Bangladesh's captain, Mahmud, was booed. Ahead of Bangladesh's tour of Zimbabwe in February and March the next year, he was dropped from the squad and batsman Habibul Bashar was granted the captaincy. At the time, Zimbabwe were without many of their senior players. Bangladesh lost the Test series 1–0, and the ODI series 2–1. The second Test was drawn after 3 days of no play due to heavy rains and brought an end to their run of 21 consecutive defeats dating back to November 2001, a world record in Test cricket. The solitary ODI victory was Bangladesh's first international win since defeating Pakistan in the 1999 World Cup.

Bangladesh's next matches were against the West Indies in May and June. Bangladesh lost the ODI series 3–0 and the Test series 1–0; by securing a hard-fought draw in the first match, Bangladesh managed to avoid defeat for just the third time in 29 Tests. Bangladesh participated in 2004 Asia Cup and 2004 ICC Champions Trophy winning only one match against Hong Kong. In the following months, Bangladesh suffered heavy defeats in Tests and in ODIs against touring New Zealand and India. However, in December, India toured Bangladesh in December 2004. In 2nd ODI of the series, Bangladesh defeated India in its hundredth ODI, this being only the third time that it had won against a Test playing nation.

26 December 2004
Scorecard

Bangladesh; 229/9 (50 overs)	v	India; 214 (47.5 overs)
Aftab Ahmed 67 (98); Ajit Agarkar 2/31 (9 overs)		Sridharan Sriram 57 (91); Tapash Baisya 2/35 (10 overs)

Bangladesh won by 15 runs
Bangabandhu National Stadium, Dhaka
Umpires: Aleem Dar (Pak) and AFM Akhtaruddin (Ban)
Player of the match: Mashrafe Mortaza (Ban)

- Bangladesh won the toss and elected to bat
- This was Bangladesh's 100th ODI.
- This was also Bangladesh's 1st ODI win at home.
- This was their first victory over India in an international match.

In January 2005, Zimbabwe toured Bangladesh for two Tests and five ODIs. The touring Zimbabwe team had suffered due to player disputes which in 2004 had led to the country's temporary suspension from Test cricket. Of Zimbabwe's 16-man squad, only their captain had played more than nine Tests; Bangladesh was the more experienced team. In the first match, Bangladesh secured their maiden victory in Test cricket. Bangladesh's batsmen secured a draw in the second Test by batting out the final five sessions after coach Dav Whatmore had opined that "Zimbabwe will win, unless our batsmen do something special".

6–10 January 2005
Scorecard

Bangladesh	v	Zimbabwe
488 (149.3 Overs); Habibul Bashar 94 (128); Chris Mpofu 4/109 (29 Overs)		312 (131.4 Overs); Tatenda Taibu 92 (241); Mohammad Rafique 5/132 (41.4 Overs)
204/9 dec (51.1 Overs); Habibul Bashar 55 (80); Elton Chigumbura 5/54 (16.1 Overs)		154 (64.2 Overs); Hamilton Masakadza 56 (130); Enamul Haque jnr 6/45 (22.2 Overs)

Bangladesh won by 226 runs
MA Aziz Stadium, Chittagong
Umpires: Asad Rauf (PAK) and Tyron Wijewardene (SL)
Player of the match: Enamul Haque jnr (BAN)

- Bangladesh won the toss and elected to bat
- First Test win for Bangladesh.

In the match – which helped secure a historic first series victory for Bangladesh – Enamul Haque Jr broke his own bowling record for best figures in an innings for Bangladesh by taking 7 wickets for 95 runs, and secured the best figures in a match for Bangladesh: 12 wickets for 200 runs and captain Habibul Bashar hit half centuries in both innings. In the ODI series that followed, Zimbabwe won the opening two contests, and Bangladesh won the final three to take the ODI series.

After their maiden Test victory, Bangladesh embarked on its first tour of England in May and June 2005. The team faced unfamiliar conditions and the batsmen struggled against seam bowling. Bangladesh lost both matches in the Test series by an innings; the second Test was the 22nd time it had happened in 38 Tests. Pundits Mike Atherton and Richie Benaud criticised the team's performances and suggested Bangladesh was not yet suited to Test cricket. A triangular ODI series with England and Australia followed. Bangladesh won just one match out of six, but their solitary victory was against an Australian team that at the time were world champions in what Wisden described as "the greatest upset in 2,250 one-day internationals".

18 June 2005
Scorecard

Australia; 249/5 (50 overs)	v	Bangladesh; 250/5 (49.2 overs)
Damien Martyn 77 (112); Tapash Baisya 3/69 (10 overs)		Mohammad Ashraful 100 (101); Jason Gillespie 2/41 (9.2 overs)

Bangladesh won by 5 wickets
Sophia Gardens, Cardiff
Umpires: BF Bowden (NZ) and DR Shepherd (Eng)
Player of the match: Mohammad Ashraful (Ban)

- Australia won the toss and elected to bat.
- First ODI win by Bangladesh against Australia.

Mohammad Ashraful scored his first century in that match with a score of exactly 100, which was enough to take the team to victory and then played a blistering knock of 94 off 53 balls against England the following match.

Bangladesh's next fixture was in Sri Lanka in September for two Tests and three ODIs. After the one-off victory against Australia in England, Bangladesh was a more confident team; however, Sri Lanka won all five matches by large margins. Captain Habibul Bashar lamented his team's defeat, describing it as "the worst tour since I took over the captaincy".

The home season of 2006 began with the series against Sri Lanka, which registered its first win against Sri Lanka ever in the second match of the ODI series. However Bangladesh lost both ODIs and Test series 2–1 and 2–0 respectively.

In April, Australia toured for a 2-match Test series and 3-match ODI series. Bangladesh came very close to beating Australia in a Test match, taking a first-innings lead of 158, and eventually losing by only three wickets. However, Bangladesh lost the second Test by an innings and three ODIs by huge margins.

India hosted the 2006 ICC Champions Trophy in October and November. Bangladesh failed to progress beyond the group stages, losing two of their three matches. Their only victory came against Zimbabwe.

In November, Zimbabwe toured Bangladesh for a T20 and a 5-match ODI series. Bangladesh won their inaugural T20I match against Zimbabwe in front of the home crowd.

28 November 2006
(Scorecard)

Bangladesh; 166 (19.5 overs)	v	Zimbabwe; 123/9 (20 overs)
Mashrafe Mortaza 36 (26); Prosper Utseya 3/25 (4 overs)		Sean Williams 38 (42); Abdur Razzak 3/17 (4 overs)

Bangladesh won by 43 runs
Khulna Divisional Stadium, Khulna, Bangladesh
Umpires: Enamul Haque (Ban) and Nadir Shah (Ban)
Player of the match: Mashrafe Mortaza (BAN)

- Zimbabwe won the toss and elected to field.
- This was both Bangladesh and Zimbabwe's inaugural T20I match.

Bangladesh subsequently went on to whitewash the same opponent in the five-match ODI series.

Bangladesh capped year 2006 with two more ODI victories over Scotland. That year, Shahriar Nafees became the first Bangladeshi to score over a thousand runs (which included three centuries) in a calendar year, while Mashrafe Mortaza became the leading wicket-taker in the world in ODIs staged in 2006 with 49 wickets.

Ahead of the World Cup Bangladesh faced Zimbabwe in four ODIs, and Bermuda and Canada one each; of those matches, Bangladesh lost a single ODI to Zimbabwe. Australia, Bangladesh, India and Pakistan were the only teams to win both of their warm-up games. On 17 March, in their first match of the 2007 World Cup, hosted by the West Indies, Bangladesh secured a five-wicket win over India; the surprise result triggered late night partying in Bangladesh despite government bans on public gatherings. In their remaining group matches Bangladesh lost to Sri Lanka and defeated Bermuda, which was enough to secure qualification for the second round while India was knocked out. Bangladesh's only victory in the Super Eights was against South Africa, losing to everyone else including Ireland, a team mostly made up of amateur cricketers.

In April 2007, after four years as coach, Mukil Mathavan chose not to extend his contract, but agreed to remain in charge until the end of May, to allow the BCB to find and appoint his successor and also to guide the team through the two Tests and three ODIs at home against India. After Bangladesh had helped knock India out of the tournament, the series was seen as an opportunity for India to exact revenge. India won the three-match ODI series 2–0, one being washed out. Bangladesh had not played Test cricket since April 2006. The first Test was shortened due to rain and drawn, but India won the second by their largest margin ever (by an innings and 239 runs). In the aftermath Habibul Bashar, who had previously resigned as ODI captain, was replaced as captain by 22-year-old Mohammad Ashraful in all forms of the game. Mashrafe Mortaza was appointed vice-captain.

=== Under Shaun Williams (2007) ===
BCB appointed their Under-19 coach Shaun Williams as Bangladesh's interim coach until they find Whatmore's long-term successor. Mohammad Ashraful was appointed Test & ODI captain in June 2007. Ashraful's first series in charge was a tour of Sri Lanka in June and July. Bangladesh suffered heavy defeats in each of the three Tests; losing by an inning on every occasion, and three ODIs. In the first innings of the second Test, Bangladesh was bundled out for their lowest total (62) at that time.

Before the World T20, Bangladesh played two T20Is in Kenya. Here, they enjoyed victory over Kenya, but lost to Pakistan. South Africa hosted the 2007 ICC World Twenty20 in September. Bangladesh defeated the West Indies at the group stage to progress to the Super 8 stage of the tournament. However, it was the only match they won in the tournament, losing next four matches. During the Super 8 match against Bangladesh, Australian fast bowler Brett Lee took the first Twenty20 International (T20I) hat-trick ever achieved.

=== Under Jamie Siddons (2007–2011) ===
In late October, BCB appointed Jamie Siddons, an Australian cricketer, as their head coach. At the end of 2007, Bangladesh toured New Zealand. They were soundly beaten 3–0 in the one-dayers. Bangladesh started the new year with the Test leg of the tour. These matches were also one-sided, where Bangladesh lost the series 2–0.

In February–March 2008, South Africa clean-swept Bangladesh across formats. The tour included two Tests and three ODIs. However, in the 1st Test, Bangladesh secured a first innings lead of 22 runs after restricting South Africa for 170.

Bangladesh then defeated non-Test-playing Ireland 3–0 in an ODI series at home in the same month, ending a run of 14 losses.

Pakistan hosted Bangladesh for 5 ODIs and a T20I in April. It was a miserable tour for Bangladesh where they lost all games.

Bangladesh lost both first-round games against Pakistan and India at a triangular ODI tournament held in Bangladesh in June.

At the 2008 Asia Cup held in Pakistan, Bangladesh won their first group stage game against associate UAE. Even though they lost to Sri Lanka in the next group stage match, Bangladesh reached the super four stage, before losing the next three games against India, Sri Lanka and Pakistan.

They were later got whitewashed 0–3 in the ODIs during their tour to Australia in August–September.

In October, New Zealand toured Bangladesh for three ODIs and two Tests. Shortly before the tour, fourteen Bangladesh players left to play in the Indian Cricket League and were subsequently banned for ten years. Six of the players were centrally contracted, including former captain Habibul Bashar. With a less experienced team than usual and a poor record against New Zealand, Bangladesh was expected to lose heavily. After winning the opening ODI (their first ODI victory ever over New Zealand), Bangladesh went on to lose the series 2–1. New Zealand won the first Test by three wickets in what their coach, John Bracewell, described as "one of the great character wins". The second Test ended up in a rain curtailed draw, sealing the series victory for New Zealand (1–0). But in the process Shakib Al Hasan emerged as an all-rounder. Having previously been selected primarily as a batsman, he went on to take the best bowling figures in an innings for a Bangladesh player, 7 wickets for 36 runs, beating the record set by Enamul Haque Jr three years earlier.

In November, Bangladesh toured South Africa. They lost all their matches, including the only T20I match, two of the three ODIs (the third being washed out due to rain) and both Tests by innings.

In December, however, Bangladesh bounced back from the previous lacklustre performances by threatening to win the first Test match against Sri Lanka at home by chasing down the highest fourth innings total of 513. Though they fell 107 runs short, their performances were praised. But in the second test match of this home series in January, Bangladesh succumbed to a 465 runs defeat, conceding the series 2–0 to Sri Lanka. Then Zimbabwe joined the hosts and the Lankan team for a tri-series ODI tournament, which proved to be more evenly matched than was expected. In the first match, Zimbabwe defeated Bangladesh by an excellent performance, but then was defeated by Sri Lanka by a huge margin, leaving Bangladesh needing to win with a bonus point against the Lankans in the last group match to go through to the finals to join the Lankans. In a reduced match due to rain interruptions, Bangladesh recorded their second ODI win over Sri Lanka to reach the finals. However, at the Finals, they were beaten by the Lankans who claimed the Series.

Later in the same month the three-match ODI series against Zimbabwe at home was won by Bangladesh 2–1.

At the 2009 ICC World Twenty20 held in England, Bangladesh crashed out of the tournament at the group stage after losing both games against India and associate Ireland.

The aftermath of the losses at the global event, the selectors appointed Mashrafe Mortaza as the new captain of the team for the tour to the West Indies so that Ashraful could focus on his batting. The two Test series was played amidst controversy when a pay dispute between the West Indian players and the West Indies Cricket Board led a number of West Indian players boycotting the series, which forced the West Indies to select a number of inexperienced players as replacements. Bangladesh went on to win both of the Tests, winning the first Test by 95 runs and the second by four wickets. In the process they achieved their first overseas Test series victory.

9–13 July 2009
scorecard

Bangladesh	v	West Indies
238 (88.2 overs); Mashrafe Mortaza 39 (52); Kemar Roach 3/46 (23 overs)		307 (95.1 overs); Omar Phillips 94 (177); Mahmudullah 3/59 (19.4 overs)
345 (120.1 overs); Tamim Iqbal 128 (243); Darren Sammy 5/70 (30.1 overs)		181 (70.1 overs); David Bernard 52* (134); Mahmudullah 5/51 (15 overs)

Bangladesh won by 95 runs
Arnos Vale Ground, Kingstown, Saint Vincent
Umpires: Asoka de Silva (SL) and Tony Hill (NZ)
Player of the match: Tamim Iqbal (Ban)

- Bangladesh won the toss and elected to bat
- Rain delayed the start on day 1 by three hours and continued to interrupt play during the day
- This was Bangladesh's maiden Test win as a touring team.

In the ODI series which followed, Bangladesh secured their first ODI win against the West Indies at the 14th attempt.

Bangladesh won the series 3–0, but lost the only Twenty20 match.

Bangladesh emerged victorious 4–1 and 4–1 in back to back five match ODI series against Zimbabwe away (in August) and home (in October–November).

In November, Shakib was named The Wisden Cricketer's "Test Player of the Year".

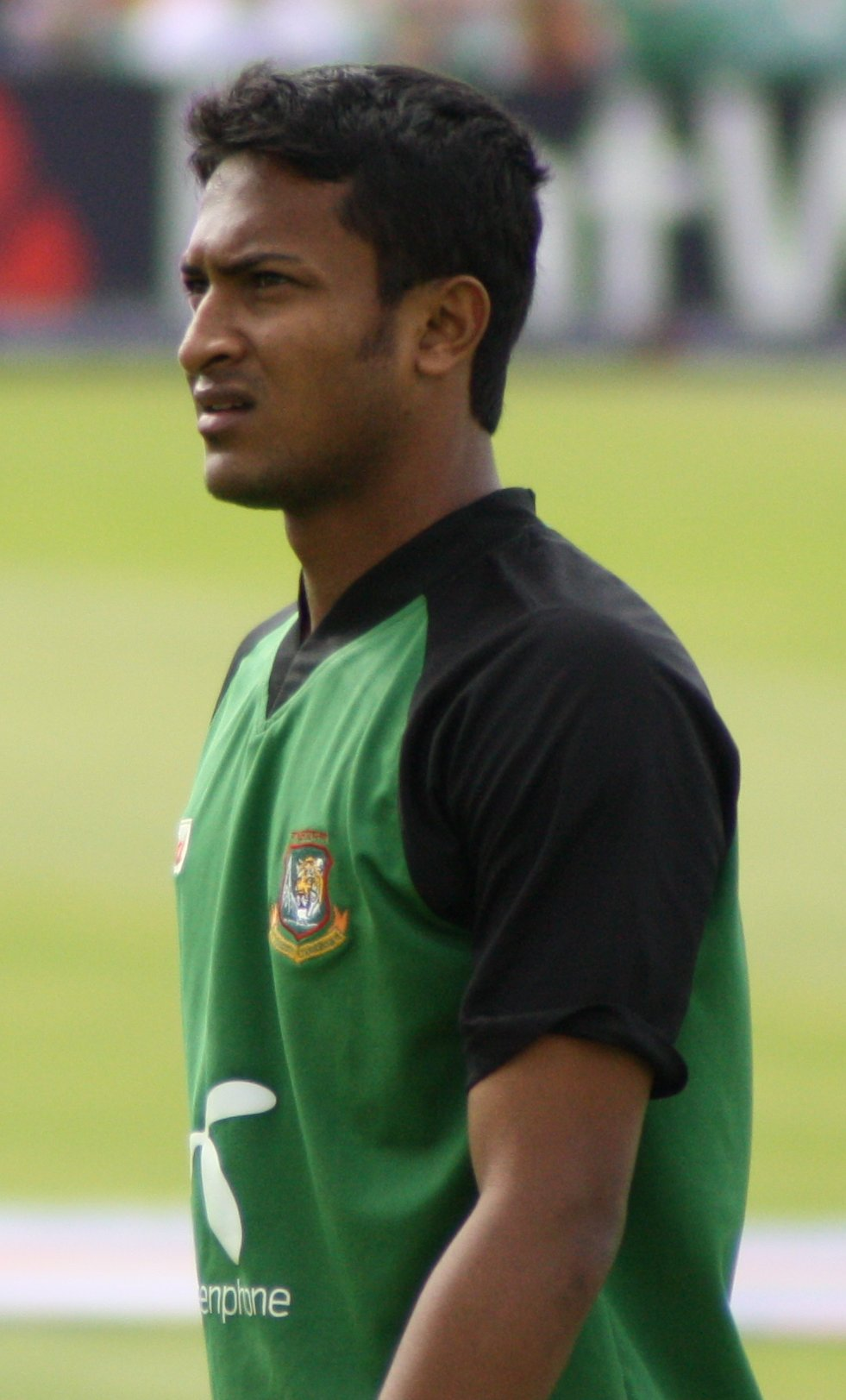
Shakib Al Hasan captained Bangladesh during their historic Test series win against West Indies in 2009.

In January 2010, Bangladesh hosted a tri-series ODI tournament with India and Sri Lanka. They failed to win a match (in 4 matches) and went out of the tournament. That was followed by a two-match Test series against India at home, which Bangladesh lost 2–0.

During full away tour in February 2010 against New Zealand, Bangladesh lost all matches (only T20I, three ODIs and only Test).

In February–March 2010, England visited Bangladesh to play three ODIs and two Test matches. Bangladesh lost all their ODIs and Tests in the series.

In May, Bangladesh took part in the 2010 World Twenty20. They lost all their matches at group stage (against Pakistan and Australia) and failed to progress to the Super Eights stage.

In May and June, Bangladesh played two Test matches against England away, losing both, although Tamim Iqbal scored two centuries in the series.

Between the Tests and ODIs against England, Bangladesh took part in the 2010 Asia Cup during June, but lost all their matches vs India, Sri Lanka and Pakistan.

In the ODI series, England comfortably won the first match. However, in the second match at Bristol, Bangladesh beat England for the first time in international cricket (England were the only Test playing nation yet to be beaten by Bangladesh), bowling England out in the final over to win by five runs. However England won the third ODI at Birmingham and sealed the series 2–1. Bangladesh extended this tour in Europe to play a 2-match ODIs series against Ireland. The series was shared (1–1). The one-off ODI against Scotland was abandoned due to heavy rains. Later Netherlands won the last one-off ODI of the tour.

In October New Zealand went to Bangladesh for five ODIs. Mortaza suffered an injury in the first match and Shakib took over as captain. Under his leadership Bangladesh won the series 4–0 (2nd ODI was abandoned due to rain), securing their first series victory against a full strength ICC full member nation.

Although unable to play against New Zealand due to injury, while the series was in progress Tamim Iqbal was named The Wisden Cricketer's "Test Player of the Year".

In December Bangladesh hosted Zimbabwe for five ODIs. After losing the opening match, Bangladesh went on to win the next three complete matches, with 4th ODI called off due to rain, to beat Zimbabwe 3–1.

In February and March 2011, Bangladesh co-hosted the World Cup with India and Sri Lanka. Bangladesh lost the tournament opener against India, before the win against Ireland. The next match was won by West Indies after dismissing Bangladesh for 58 runs, the team's lowest score in ODIs and a record low for a full member at the World Cup. The West Indies and Bangladesh team buses were stoned as they left the ground, and so was Shakib's house. In the match against England, Bangladesh's score was at one point 169/8 but tail ender 58 run partnership brought victory for the team. Bangladesh's win in this match was only their second against England in a total of 15 ODIs.

Bangladesh later defeated the Netherlands, making their final match of the group stage a must-win contest. Against South Africa, Bangladesh succumbed to their second-largest defeat in ODIs and became the first full member team to be bowled out for under 100 twice in World Cups, thereby failing to progress to the knockout stage of the tournament.

Then Australia completed a 3–0 sweep in ODIs against Bangladesh when they visited the country in April.

Middle of the Australian visit, BCB confirmed that Siddons unlikely to win a contract extension from the moment his team failed to meet lofty home expectations during the 2011 World Cup. Under his mentorship, Bangladesh won 2 Tests (in 19), 31 ODIs (in 84). They did not win any T20Is (in 8) during this period. First overseas Test series victory, first Test match and series victories over West Indies, first ODI wins against New Zealand, West Indies and England, clean sweeps in ODIs against West Indies (away) and New Zealand (home), reaching the final of a triangular tournament where all participants are ICC full members, consistent wins in bilateral ODI series against Zimbabwe (4) were the highlights for Siddons as the Bangladesh head coach. During his three-and-a-half-year tenure as coach Siddons introduced a full coaching staff for the first time, including coaches for bowling, strength and conditioning, and fielding. Under Siddons Bangladesh's reliance on spin bowlers continued, partly because pitches in the country encourage spin bowlers, and frequently only two seam bowlers were used in a match. Siddons was credited with helping the team improve mentally.

=== Under Stuart Law (2011–2012) ===
A lengthy hunt for a head coach, followed Siddons' exit encountering the names of Vincent Barnes and Stuart Law as possible appointees. Law, who at the time was the interim head coach of Sri Lanka following Trevor Bayliss' departure, was named Bangladesh's new head coach starting from 1 July 2011.

Bangladesh toured Zimbabwe in August 2011 for a one-off Test and five ODIs. The Test marked Zimbabwe's return to the longest-format of the game, after a self-imposed withdrawal in January 2006 as the sport in the country was in a state of disarray. Bangladesh lost the match by 130 runs. Though they were expected to do well with the Test and the ODIs, Bangladesh lost the subsequent one-day series 3–2. In the aftermath of the series, captain Shakib Al Hasan and vice captain Tamim Iqbal were sacked from their leadership roles, with a BCB representative citing their poor leadership. Later that month, wicket-keeper Mushfiqur Rahim was named captain, with all-rounder Mahmudullah as his deputy.

Bangladesh's struggles at the international level have been epitomised by the ineffectiveness of their fast bowlers. Between January 2010 and August 2011, they took 37 wickets in 8 Tests at an average of 67.67, the worst out of the nine teams playing regular Test cricket in this period.

Though Bangladesh won Rahim's first match in charge, the only T20I against West Indies at home in October, the team lost the subsequent ODI series 2–1 and the two-match Test series 1–0.

Pakistan toured in December, and during the first of three ODIs Bangladesh were dismissed for their 13th score of less than 100 in the format, overtaking Zimbabwe's record of 12 times. Bangladesh got whitewashed comprehensively across formats, 0–1 (T20I), 0–3 (ODIs) and 0–2 (Tests).

In March Bangladesh hosted in the 2012 Asia Cup featuring India, Pakistan, and Sri Lanka. Bangladesh entered the tournament with just two wins from 29 Asia Cup matches. Victories against India and Sri Lanka saw Bangladesh face Pakistan in the final, only the second time the team had reached the final of a multi-national competition. Though Pakistan won the final by two runs, Bangladesh had exceeded expectations. During the tournament, Tamim Iqbal became the first Bangladeshi player to score four consecutive fifties in ODIs. Shakib Al Hasan was named man of the series after contributing with both the bat and the ball, making 237 runs and taking 6 wickets respectively.

The following month Law announced he would be stepping down as coach in June when his contract was due to expire for personal reasons. Bangladesh had not won any Tests (in 5) under Law. Further they only won 5 ODIs (in 15) and 1 T20I (in 2) during this period. Reaching the finals of Asia Cup 2012 was the pinnacle of Law's tenure as Bangladesh coach.

=== Under Richard Pybus (2012) ===
In May 2012 Bangladesh appointed England born Richard Pybus as their new head coach for two-years, replacing Stuart Law who stepped down from the post in April.

In July, Bangladesh toured Ireland and Netherlands. Bangladesh clean swept the three-match T20I series becoming no. 4 in T20I rankings surpassing Pakistan and Australia. In the same month, Bangladesh lost a T20I against Scotland and shared the two-match T20I series against Netherlands by 1–1.

Bangladesh crashed out of the 2012 ICC World Twenty20 by losing to New Zealand and Pakistan in the first round.

After only four months at the helm, Pybus notified the BCB of his unwillingness to continue due to issues with his contract and interference from administration. Under him Bangladesh won 4 T20Is (in 8).

=== Under Shane Jurgensen (2012–2014) ===
The team's bowling coach and Australian Shane Jurgensen was appointed as the interim Bangladesh coach for the series against West Indies at home in November–December 2012. The home team lost the two Tests, but won the ODI series 3–2, before losing the only T20I.

In February 2013, BCB announced that Jurgensen will continue as Bangladesh's head coach for the rest of the year.

Bangladesh toured Sri Lanka in March 2013 for a full series. In the 1st Test at Galle Mushfiqur Rahim scored the first double century for Bangladesh in test cricket, and Mohammad Ashraful chipped in with a handy 190. They were able to draw the 1st Test against Sri Lanka, the first time ever against the island nation. Sri Lanka won the 2nd Test by 7 wickets and the two match test series 1–0. The three match ODI series was shared 1–1 since the 2nd ODI being washed out. Bangladesh lost the only T20I too.

Then they toured Zimbabwe from April–May. Bangladesh lost the 1st Test by 335 runs, which marked Zimbabwe's biggest win. Later they won the 2nd Test by 173 runs to share the series with Zimbabwe (1–1). Bangladesh lost the ODI series (1–2) before sharing the T20I series (1–1).

Later in October–November 2013, New Zealand toured Bangladesh for a full series. Bangladesh achieved a new feat sharing the two-match test series (0–0) on home soil against New Zealand, the first against the country.

This was followed by 3–0 series whitewash win for Bangladesh in ODIs, before losing the only T20I.

Sri Lanka toured Bangladesh for full series from January–February 2014. Bangladesh slip to their fourth-heaviest defeat in their Test history after losing the 1st Test by an innings and 248 runs. The 2nd test was a high scoring draw and Bangladesh lost the series (0–1). Later they got whitewashed in the T20I (0–2) and the ODI (0–3) series.

That was followed up by a series of defeats (0–4) against Asian Cricketing nations (India, Afghanistan, Pakistan, Sri Lanka) at the league stage of 2014 Asia Cup conducted on their home soil and Bangladesh finished at the bottom of the table. Associate Afghanistan's win against Bangladesh was their first ODI victory against a Test-playing nation.

Bangladesh ended their 11-match win-less run in 2014 defeating two associates (Afghanistan and Nepal) in consecutive T20Is at the 2014 ICC World Twenty20 Group stage. Their loss to another associate, Hong Kong, did not prevent them reaching the Super 10 stage. However at the Super 10 stage, Bangladesh lost all (0–4) their matches against West Indies, India, Pakistan and Australia.

The coach resigned from his position less than a month after the World T20, where the team won just two out of seven matches. Under Jurgensen, Bangladesh won 1 Test (in 10), 8 ODIs (in 21) and 3 T20Is (in 14). Highlights of his tenure were the Test win after 4 years (against Zimbabwe), shared two-test series against New Zealand at home, 3–0 ODI clean sweep against New Zealand at home and securing 2 draws in Tests against Sri Lanka (away and home).

=== Under Chandika Hathurusingha (2014–2017) ===
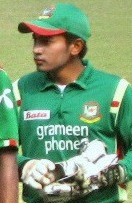
Mushfiqur Rahim captained Bangladesh in their historic 100th ODI win over Sri Lanka and their first test win against England and Australia.

The BCB appointed Chandika Hathurusingha, a former Sri Lanka batsman, as Bangladesh's head coach for a two-year period.

The first series under the new coach was against India at home. Bangladesh lost the first & second ODI comprehensively and the 3rd was washed out and lost the series 2–0.

In August 2014, Bangladesh toured West Indies for a full series. West Indies beat Bangladesh 3–0 in the ODI series extending Bangladesh's win-less ODI run for 13 matches. In the 2nd ODI Bangladesh was bundled out for 70 which is the 3rd lowest total for Bangladesh. Bangladesh lost the match by 177 Runs. Only the T20I match was abandoned. Further, West Indies white-washed Bangladesh in the Test series 2–0, defeating Bangladesh by 10 wickets in the 1st Test and by 296 runs in the 2nd Test respectively.

Bangladesh finally emerged victorious during the Zimbabwe tour in Bangladesh whitewashing the visitors 3–0 during the Test series. Bangladesh claimed No. 9 ranking with the series victory pushing Zimbabwe to No. 10. In the ODI series, Bangladesh whitewashed Zimbabwe 5–0.

==== 2015: Rise in ODI ====
At the turn of the new year, Bangladeshi all-rounder Shakib Al Hasan emerged as the number one all-rounder in all formats of the game. This was the first time that any player ever achieved such a feat, after the ICC introduced ranking system.

During the group stage of the 2015 Cricket World Cup, Bangladesh defeated Afghanistan in their first game where Shakib Al Hasan became the first Bangladeshi cricketer to reach 4,000 ODI runs and their next match against Australia was Washed Out. They lost their next game to Sri Lanka by 92 runs. Following that, they achieved their highest successful run-chase in an ODI, when they chased down Scotland's 318, Bangladesh later qualified for the second quarterfinal in the 2015 world cup, by defeating England. At the second quarter-final, India comprehensively defeated Bangladesh by 109 runs, knocking them out of the 2015 World Cup. After a successful World Cup campaign, reaching the quarter final for the first time, the whole team was given a grand reception at the airport on 22 March.

In April–May 2015, Pakistan was in Bangladesh for a full series. Bangladesh won the ODI series 3–0 recording their first series victory over Pakistanis. The only T20I was also won by Bangladesh. However Pakistan claimed the Test series victory (1–0), by drawing the first test and winning the second test by 328 runs.

A full strength Indian team arrived in Bangladesh in June 2015, for a one-off Test and 3 ODIs, where the Indians were expected to win comfortably. During the Test, the Indian team was too strong for Bangladesh where they were enforced to follow on. But the heavy rain interruptions denied a decisive result (only 184.2 overs were played). However excellent performances by the batsmen and ODI debutant bowler Mustafizur Rahman had the tables turned over as Bangladesh convincingly won the first two ODIs and for the first time, won a bilateral series against India by a margin of 2–1.

During July 2015 South Africa visited Bangladesh for 2 T20Is, 3 ODIs and 2 Tests. South Africa whitewashed Bangladesh in the T20I series (2–0) and took the lead of ODI series winning the first match. However Bangladesh came back strongly and completely dominated South Africa in the following two matches, showing excellent performance in all three departments where none of the team in any match could reach 200 runs in an innings in the whole ODI series, to win the series by a margin of 2–1, which marked the first series win ever against South Africa. Two match test series was shared (0–0) after heavy monsoon rains curtailed both games (played 221 and 88.1 overs respectively).

Strong performances shown by Bangladesh in ODIs since the ICC Cricket World Cup 2015, winning ODI series against Pakistan, India and South Africa, helped it jump from ninth to seventh in the ODI Team Rankings. Since they were ranked No. 7 in ODIs on 30 September 2015 which was the cut-off date, they have qualified for the 2017 ICC Champions Trophy replacing West Indies.

In November 2015, The Zimbabwean cricket team toured in Bangladesh. The tour consisted of three One Day Internationals (ODIs), two Twenty20 Internationals (T20Is). Bangladesh won the ODI series 3–0 and shared the T20I series 1–1.

==== 2016: Rise in T20I ====
In January 2016, Zimbabwe toured Bangladesh for another T20I series consisting of 4 games. Again the series was shared 2–2.

The golden run continued to Bangladesh when they became runner up of 2016 Asia Cup, played on home soil. They lost the first match at group stage to India. Then they won against UAE and then Sri Lanka (reigning World T20 champions and Asian champions at that time). They also beat Pakistan to reach the Asia Cup final for the second time. However they were again comprehensively beaten by India in the final.

However Bangladesh did not have a significant success during the 2016 ICC World Twenty20 held in India in March–April 2016. Wins against two associates (Netherlands and Oman) and the washed out game against another associate (Ireland) at the group stage saw them reach the Super 10.

In the group stage match against Oman, Tamim Iqbal became first Bangladeshi batsman to score a T20I century and at least a century in all formats. They returned home losing all four games at the Super 10 stage against full members Pakistan, Australia, India and New Zealand.

In September 2016, Afghanistan toured Bangladesh for an ODI series. Bangladesh emerged victorious in another home ODI series by 2–1.

This was followed by the England tour of Bangladesh, where Bangladesh lost the ODI leg by 2–1. But they secured a historic Test win (by 108-runs) against England, their first win in 10 attempts, and sharing the two-match Test series 1–1, after losing the first Test narrowly by 22-runs. Bangladesh toured New Zealand for a complete series in December 2016. Bangladesh started the tour with a 3–0 whitewash defeat in ODI series and the dawn of new year 2017 saw a similar 3–0 whitewash defeat in T20I series. Further, Bangladesh lost the Test series 2–0. However they broke the 123 years old record for the Highest first innings total in tests to lose during the 1st Test vs New Zealand by scoring 595/8 dec. They finished the tour losing all the games 8–0.

Then Bangladesh toured India in February 2017 for the historical first Test match between two countries on Indian soil. India won the game comprehensively by 208 runs, having declared in both innings.

The next assignment for Bangladesh was another full away tour in Sri Lanka in March–April 2017. Bangladesh were comprehensively beaten by 259 runs in the first Test. However, they were able draw the Test series 1–1, by winning the second Test by four-wicket. That meant Bangladesh won their 100th Test match becoming one of the four teams to achieve that feat. Further this was Bangladesh's first Test match victory against Sri Lanka. Bangladesh led the ODI series after two games 1–0, since winning the first ODI by 90 runs and the second ODI being washed away by rain. However Sri Lanka won the third ODI by 70 runs, levelling the ODI series 1–1. The T20I series was also shared 1–1.

In May 2017, Bangladesh finished second at the 2017 Ireland Tri-Nation Series held in Ireland, winning 2 (vs New Zealand and Ireland), losing 1 (vs New Zealand) and 1 washed out (vs Ireland) games. Bangladesh moved to sixth place in the ICC ODI Rankings for the first time following its 5 wickets victory over 4th ranked New Zealand. This was also the first time Bangladesh has been ranked ahead of three former world champions – Sri Lanka, Pakistan, the West Indies – and Zimbabwe.

Bangladesh started the 2017 ICC Champions Trophy campaign with a defeat in the series opener against England. However, a washout against Australia and a famous win against New Zealand in Cardiff helped them to reach the semi-finals for the first time in Bangladesh cricket history. They were knocked out of the tournament after losing to India by 9 wickets in the semi-finals.

Australia toured Bangladesh in August–September 2017 for a two-match Test series. Host Bangladesh registered their first Test match win ever over Australia when they defeated the touring team by 20 runs during the first Test. However Bangladesh was unable to secure the series victory, since Australia won the second Test by 7 wickets and the series was shared 1–1.

In September–October 2017, Bangladesh toured South Africa to play 2 Tests, 3 ODIs and 2 T20Is where Bangladesh was whitewashed 0–7 across formats. Team South Africa was too strong for Bangladesh and these games were extremely one-sided, creating several new team and personal records. Bangladesh lost two Test by 333 runs and by an innings and 254 runs respectively. The latter being the biggest Test win ever for South Africa. South Africa won the 1st ODI by 10 wickets which registered the highest target (279) chased down without losing a wicket in ODIs. In last two ODIs Bangladesh lost comprehensively by 104 and by 200 runs. Later Bangladesh also lost the 2 T20Is by 20 runs and 83 runs. During the 2nd T20I David Miller scored the fastest T20I century ever recorded. However, during the middle of this tour Bangladesh was qualified for the 2019 Cricket World Cup since they were at No. 7 of ICC ODI rankings by 30 September 2017 cut-off date.

On 9 November 2017, BCB president Nazmul Hassan announced that Hathurusingha submitted resignation from the post of Bangladesh head coach during the team's tour of South Africa. During his tenure, Bangladesh won 6 Tests (in 21), 25 ODIs (in 52) and 10 T20Is (in 29) which is arguably the most successful era of Bangladesh Cricket. Further, under his wings Bangladesh reached quarter finals of 2015 Cricket World Cup, qualified and later reached semi-finals of 2017 ICC Champions Trophy, qualified for 2019 Cricket World Cup, became runner up of 2016 Asia Cup, defeated India, Pakistan and South Africa in home bilateral series, climbed up to No. 6 of ODI rankings, registered their first Test wins against England, Sri Lanka and Australia. He was instrumental in Bangladesh beginning to actively picking more pace bowlers in their attack.

Shakib Al Hasan had replaced Mushfiqur Rahim as Bangladesh's Test captain, starting with the Sri Lanka's tour in January 2018. Mahmudullah took over the vice-captaincy from Tamim Iqbal while the BCB was set to announce a new coach.

=== Under Richard Halsall (2018) ===
BCB chairman announced that their assistant coach Richard Halsall, will be in charge of coaching the team ahead of the Tri-nation ODI series held in January 2018 at home. Convincing wins against low ranked opponents, Sri Lanka and Zimbabwe, in the first three group games saw Bangladesh reach the finals. Bangladesh recorded their biggest win in ODI cricket (won by 163 runs) against Sri Lanka during the process. However Bangladesh were bowled out for 82 (which was their ninth-lowest ODI total) and lost by 10 wickets in the last group game against Sri Lanka. They met Sri Lanka in the finals and lost the match by 79 runs, extending their win-less run in tournament finals. The 1st Test against Sri Lanka was a high scoring draw. Later, Bangladesh lost the 2nd Test by 215 runs inside 3 days, conceding the Test series 1–0. Bangladesh also lost the T20I series 2–0.

=== Under Courtney Walsh (2018) ===
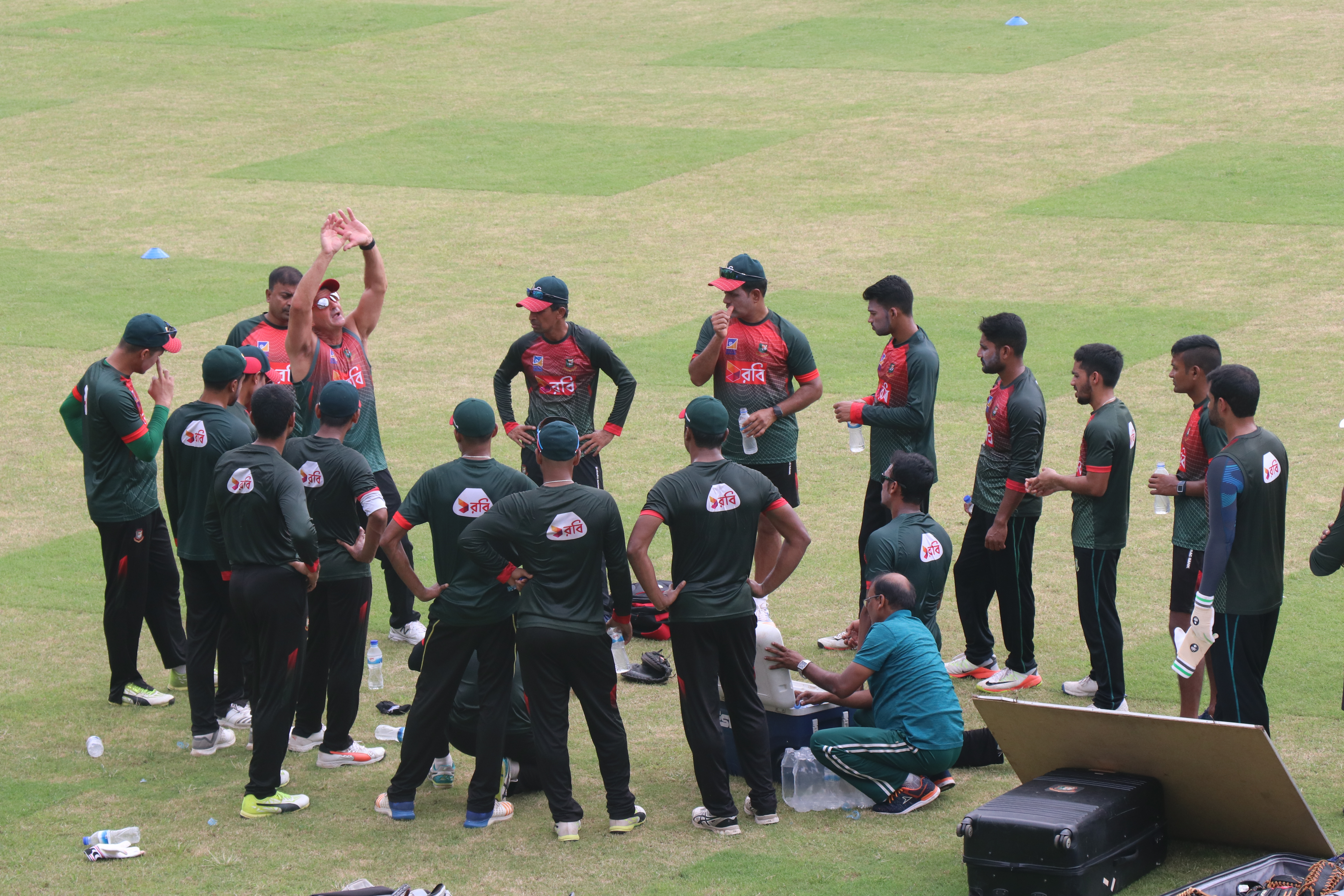
Bangladesh team on practice session at Sher-e-Bangla National Cricket Stadium

Courtney Walsh acted as the interim coach for 2018 Nidahas Trophy, a triangular T20I series held in Sri Lanka in March. Bangladesh lost the tournament final against India, after reaching there defeating Sri Lanka twice in group matches.

On 1 May 2018, Bangladesh broke into the top eight of the Test rankings for the first time, as a result of the ICC's annual update to the rankings.

Bangladesh got whitewashed in a 3 match T20I series against Afghanistan in India, losing their matches by 45 runs, by 6 wickets and by 1 run respectively. This recorded Bangladesh's first T20I match loss ever and their first T20I series loss against Afghans as well.

=== Under Steve Rhodes (2018–2019) ===
BCB appointed former England wicketkeeper Steve Rhodes the Bangladesh head coach in early March ahead of West Indies tour.

Bangladesh hit an all-time low when they were dismissed for 43 (their lowest score in Tests) during the 1st Test against West Indies at North Sound and eventually lost the test by an innings and 219 runs. Later Bangladesh lost the 2nd Test by 166 runs and lost the series 2–0. Later they performed well in limited overs formats and eventually ended up the tour by winning the three match ODI and T20I series by 2–1 margin each.

Bangladesh started their Asia Cup 2018 campaign with a win over Sri Lanka by 137 runs, which was their biggest win, by runs in ODIs away from home. Even though they faced a heavy loss in their next match at group stage against Afghanistan, (lost by 136 runs – Bangladesh's biggest loss, by runs in ODIs against Afghanistan), they have progressed to the Super Four stage. Bangladesh lost to India by 7 wickets, narrowly won against Afghanistan by 3 runs and defeated Pakistan by 37 runs at the Super Four stage to reach the Final of the Asia Cup. At the Final, they lost to India by 3 wickets, extending their win-less record in tournament Finals.

In October–November, Bangladesh hosted a three-match ODI and two-match test series against Zimbabwe. Bangladesh won the ODI series 3–0 while they drew the test series 1–1, losing the first test of the series at Sylhet which was the inaugural test of the venue.

West Indies toured Bangladesh for a full series in November–December. Bangladesh won the 2 match test series 2–0. By defeating West Indies in the 2nd test by an innings and 184 runs, Bangladesh recorded their first innings victory in Test cricket. Bangladesh also won the 3 match ODI series by 2–1 margin. But lost the T20I series by 2–1 margin. Bangladesh toured New Zealand in February–March 2019. Bangladesh got whitewashed in the 3 match ODI series. Bangladesh lost the first Test at Hamilton by an innings and 52 runs. Later they have lost the second Test at Wellington by an innings and 12 runs even after the first two days play were abandoned due to rain. The third test was canceled following the Christchurch mosque shootings, which the team narrowly escaped.

Bangladesh won their first ever multi-team ODI tournament final at Dublin on 17 May 2019 defeating West Indies by 5 wickets (D/L method) at the 2019 Ireland Tri-Nation Series. Bangladesh reached the finals defeating West Indies twice and Ireland once during league phase and the other league match against Ireland was washed out due to rain.

17 May 2019
10:45
Scorecard

West Indies; 152/1 (24 overs)	v	Bangladesh; 213/5 (22.5 overs)
Shai Hope 74 (64); Mehedi Hasan 1/22 (4 overs)		Soumya Sarkar 66 (41); Raymon Reifer 2/23 (3.5 overs)

Bangladesh won by 5 wickets (DLS method)
The Village, Malahide
Umpires: Richard Kettleborough (Eng) and Paul Reynolds (Ire)
Player of the match: Mosaddek Hossain (Ban)

- Bangladesh won the toss and elected to field.
- Bangladesh were set a revised target of 210 runs from 24 overs due to rain.

Even though they entered the 2019 Cricket World Cup with high expectations, Bangladesh finished 8th at the group stage and was unable to reach the semi-finals, after winning only three of their nine matches.

In July 2019, Rhodes' contract with the BCB was terminated, following the team's eighth-place finish in the tournament.

=== Under Khaled Mahmud (2019) ===
Khaled Mahmud, who played for Bangladesh in the 1999 Cricket World Cup, was subsequently appointed as interim coach after Steve Rhodes's contract being terminated. His first assignment in charge was Bangladesh's three-match ODI tour of Sri Lanka, from 26 to 31 July 2019, which Bangladesh received a whitewash losing the series 0–3.

=== Under Russell Domingo (2019–2022) ===
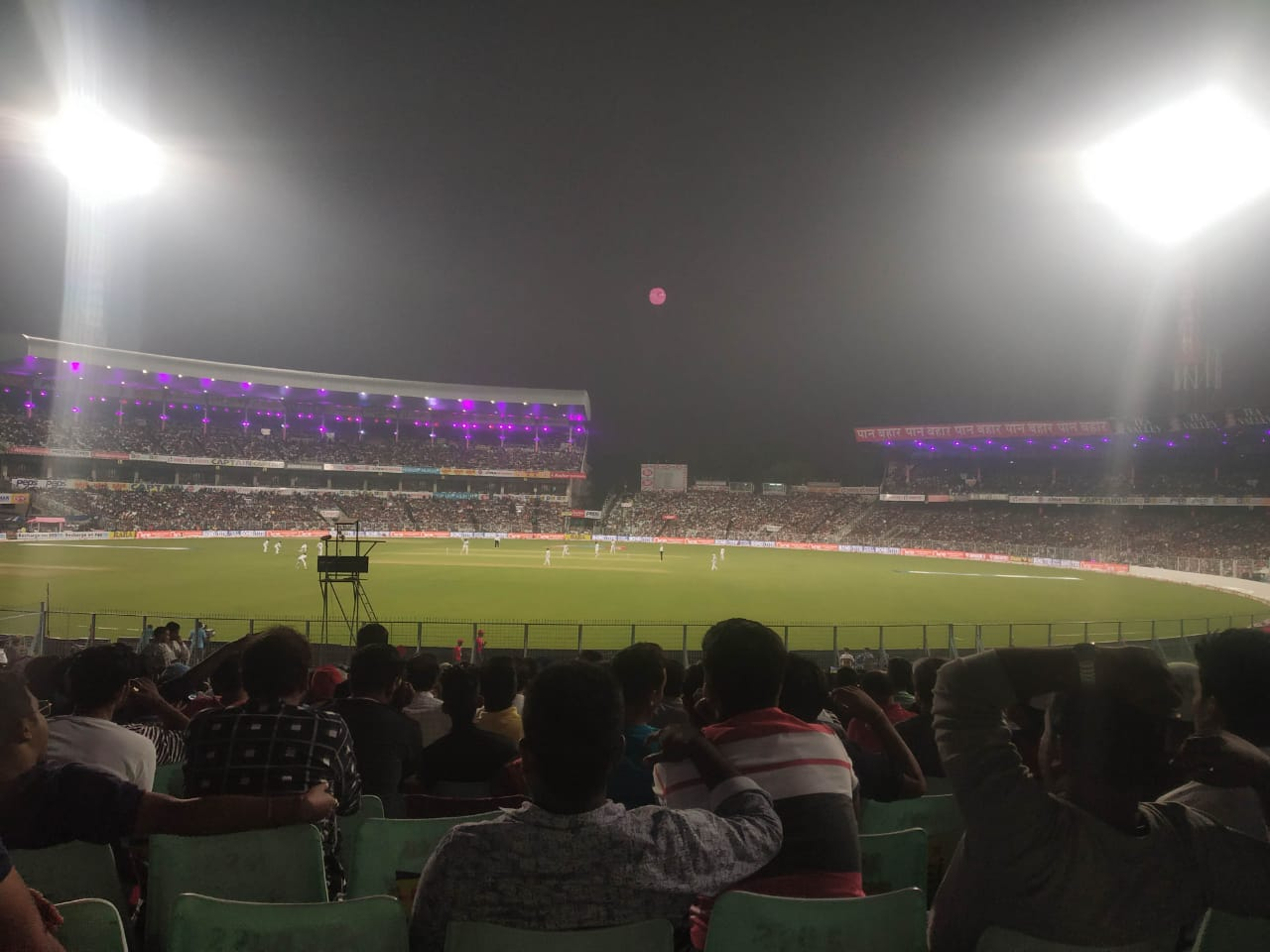
Bangladesh played their first ever Day/night Test match against India at Eden Gardens in November 2019.

BCB appointed Russell Domingo as the head coach for the national team for a 2-year contract on 17 August 2019. In his first assignment as coach Bangladesh lost to Afghanistan in one-off Test match at Chittagong in September 2019. But in the tri-series, comprising Afghanistan and Zimbabwe, Bangladesh reached to final winning 3 of their 4 group matches. But the final match with Afghanistan was washed away and two teams shared the trophy.

Bangladesh then toured India in October–November to play 3 T20Is and 2 Test matches. Bangladesh started their World Test Championship campaign with this Test series. Just before few days of the tour Bangladesh's regular Test and T20I captain Shakib Al Hasan was banned for 2 years by ICC after accepting three charges under ICC Anti-Corruption Code. Subsequently, Mominul Haque was given the charge of Test captaincy and Mahmudullah as T20I captain. Bangladesh won the first match of the tour, the first T20I at Delhi by 7 wickets and lost the remaining 2 matches by 8 wickets and 30 runs respectively losing the series 1–2. Bangladesh lost both Test matches by an innings margin, as their batsmen failed to capitalize. Whereas the second Test was the first-ever Day/night Test match played by both teams.

In January and February 2020, Bangladesh toured Pakistan to play one Test match and three Twenty20 International (T20I) matches. Pakistan won the T20I series by 2–0, with the third match abandoned due to rain. The Test match was played as part of the inaugural 2019–21 ICC World Test Championship. Bangladesh lost the Test by an innings and 44 runs.

In February 2020, Zimbabwe toured Bangladesh to play one Test, three ODI and two T20I matches. Bangladesh won the one-off Test match by an innings and 106 runs, which was Bangladesh's first Test win since Domingo took charge as the head coach of the team as well as it was their only second Test match win by an innings margin. Ahead of the tour, the BCB announced that it would be Mashrafe Mortaza's last series as captain of the ODI team. Prior to the third ODI, Mortaza confirmed that he would be stepping down as Bangladesh's ODI captain after the series. Bangladesh won the ODI series 3–0, with Mortaza recording his 50th win in an ODI match as captain with victory in the third match.

In an attempt to mitigate the impact of the COVID-19 pandemic, the BCB restricted ticket sales for the first T20I match to one per person. Bangladesh won the T20I series 2–0, to win all six international fixtures against Zimbabwe in the series. It was the first time that Bangladesh had whitewashed a team in a single series across all three formats of international cricket.

In January 2021, Bangladesh played their first international series after the COVID-19 pandemic against West Indies at home. The ODI matches were part of the inaugural ICC Cricket World Cup Super League. Bangladesh won the ODI series by 3–0. The two Test matches was played as part of the inaugural 2019–21 ICC World Test Championship. West Indies won the first Test by 3 wickets chasing 395, which was the highest successful run chase in Asia and overall fifth highest run chase in Test cricket. They also went onto win the 2nd Test by 17 runs, thus whitewashed Bangladesh in Test at home since 2012–13.

In March 2021, Bangladesh toured New Zealand to play 3 match ODI series and a 3 match T20I series. They lost both the ODI series and T20I series by 3–0. The ODI matches were part of the inaugural ICC Cricket World Cup Super League.

In April 2021, Bangladesh toured Sri Lanka for a 2 match Test series. The Test matches were played as part of the inaugural 2019–21 ICC World Test Championship. The 1st Test was a high-scoring draw which helped Bangladesh register points in the 2019–2021 ICC World Test Championship League table. But Bangladesh lost the second Test by 209 runs losing the Test series 1–0.

Sri Lanka toured Bangladesh, in May 2021 for a 3-match ODI series. These ODI matches were played as part of the inaugural 2020–2023 ICC Cricket World Cup Super League. Bangladesh won the 1st ODI by 33 runs and the 2nd ODI by 103 runs, eventually winning their maiden ODI series against Sri Lanka. However, Bangladesh lost the 3rd ODI by 97 runs.

In July 2021, Bangladesh toured Zimbabwe to play one Test, three ODI and five T20I matches. Bangladesh clinched huge 220 runs win over Zimbabwe in the one-off Test match, with Mehidy Hasan picking up a five wicket and four wicket haul in the first and second innings respectively. This was Bangladesh's first win in the year of 2021. The match also saw three centurions, Mahmudullah, Shadman Islam and Najmul Hossain Shanto, with Mahmudullah top-scoring with an unbeaten 150 runs. During the one-off Test match, Mahmudullah announced his retirement from Test cricket. Bangladesh also won the ODI series by 3–0 margin, first time they whitewashed the opponent in away series since 2009. In the first ODI, they defeated Zimbabwe by 155 runs, while Shakib Al Hasan became the leading wicket-taker for Bangladesh in ODIs, taking his 270th dismissal. They won the 2nd and 3rd ODI by 3 and 5 wickets respectively. In the 3-match T20I series, the first T20I was the 100th Twenty20 International match played by Bangladesh, which they went onto win by 8 wickets, becoming the only third team after Australia and Pakistan to win their 100th match in all three formats. Though Bangladesh lost the second match, but winning the third T20I, they swept the series by 2–1 margin. This is the first instance of Bangladesh winning all three series of a tour, having won the one-off Test and then 3-match ODI series by 3–0 and 3-match T20I series by 2–1 margin.

==== T20I series wins against Australia and New Zealand at home ====
In August 2021, Australia toured Bangladesh for a five-match T20I series.In the first T20I, Bangladesh beat Australia for the first time in that format by 23 runs.

Bangladesh went on to beat Australia in the next two matches, by 5 wickets and 10 runs respectively taking an unassailable lead. This was first time Bangladesh beating Australia in consecutive matches in any format. However, Bangladesh lost the 4th T20I by 3 wickets. In the final T20I Australia was restricted to 62 runs in their innings, which is the lowest score by any team against Bangladesh in T20Is and lowest total in for Australia in T20Is. Bangladesh won the match Bangladesh by 60 runs. Eventually, Bangladesh won the series by 4–1 margin.

In September 2021, Bangladesh hosted New Zealand for a 5-match T20I series. Bangladesh won the first T20I by 7 wickets after restricting New Zealand for 60 runs, which was the lowest total by any team against Bangladesh. This is Bangladesh's first-ever T20I victory over New Zealand. Bangladesh won the second match by 4 runs, but lost the third T20I by 52 runs. Bangladesh completed their first-ever T20I series win against New Zealand by winning the fourth match by 6 wickets. Later they lost the fifth and final game of the series by 27 runs. Eventually, Bangladesh won the series 3–2.

==== Disappointing 2021 T20 World Cup campaign ====
Ahead of ICC T20 World Cup 2021 Bangladesh announced their squad on 9 September 2021. Rubel Hossain and Aminul Islam were named as travelling reserves. However, on 10 October 2021, Aminul Islam withdrew himself from the squad and returned home.

Bangladesh played two warm-up matches before the First Round, one against Sri Lanka which they lost by 4 wickets and another against Ireland which they lost by 33 runs.

Bangladesh started off their world cup campaign with a loss where Scotland defeated Bangladesh by 6 runs. And so Bangladesh is yet to win a T20I match against associate Scotland. Later they won against other two associates (Oman and Papua New Guinea) in their qualifying group and qualified for the Super 12 stage of the tournament. However Bangladesh were unable to register a single win as they lost all five matches in Super 12 stage against any of the Full member nations : Sri Lanka (by 5 wickets), England (by 8 wickets), West Indies (by 3 runs), South Africa (by 6 wickets), and Australia (by 8 wickets) and were knocked out of the tournament even before they play their last group match. In their last two matches they were unable to cross 85 runs.

==== Home series losses against Pakistan ====
Pakistan toured Bangladesh in November and December 2021 to play two Test and three Twenty20 International (T20I) matches. The Test series was part of the 2021–2023 ICC World Test Championship.

Bangladesh received a 0–3 whitewash from Pakistan in T20I series. Bangladesh won all three tosses and elected to bat first. However, they were unable to post competitive totals in any of the matches and thus Pakistan comprehensively chased the targets winning the games by 4 wickets, 8 wickets, and 5 wickets respectively.

Bangladesh then lost both Test matches that were played at Chattogram by 8 wickets and an innings & 8 runs respectively. Bangladesh's first-innings total, 87 is the joint-lowest in Bangladesh in Test cricket.

==== Test series in New Zealand ====
Bangladesh toured New Zealand in January 2022 to play two Test matches. The Test series was a part of the 2021–2023 ICC World Test Championship.

Bangladesh won the first Test by eight wickets, played at Bay Oval. Mount Maunganui. It was Bangladesh's first win in Test cricket against New Zealand, and their first win in international cricket against New Zealand in New Zealand. However, New Zealand went on to win the second Test inside three days, beating Bangladesh by an innings and 117 runs, to draw the series 1–1.

==== Home series against Afghanistan ====
In February–March 2022, Afghanistan toured Bangladesh to play three ODIs and two T20Is to play three One Day International (ODI) and two Twenty20 International (T20I) matches. The ODI series formed part of the inaugural 2020–2023 ICC Cricket World Cup Super League.

In the first ODI, In reply to Afghanistan's 215, Bangladesh were reduced to 45/6 in the twelfth over of their run chase. However, Afif Hossain and Mehidy Hasan then made an unbeaten 174-run partnership, with Bangladesh reaching 219/6 to win the match by four wickets. The 174-run stand between Afif Hossain and Mehidy Hasan was the highest seventh-wicket partnership for Bangladesh in an ODI match, and the second-highest seventh-wicket partnership in ODI cricket.

In the second ODI, Litton Das and Mushfiqur Rahim set a new third-wicket partnership record for Bangladesh, with 202 runs. Bangladesh went on to win the match by 88 runs, winning the series with a match to play. Afghanistan won the third ODI by seven wickets. Eventually, Bangladesh won the ODI series 2–1.

In the two match T20I series, Bangladesh won the 1st T20I by a comprehensive margin of 61 runs as Afghanistan were bowled out at 94 while chasing 156. In the 2nd T20I, Bangladesh were restricted to 115/9 in 20 overs and Afghanistan chased down the target having 8 wickets in hands. The T20I series ended in a draw 1–1.

==== Away series in South Africa ====
In March 2022, Bangladesh toured South Africa to play two Tests and three One Day International (ODI) matches.

Bangladesh won the first ODI match by 38 runs, recording their first ever win against the hosts in all formats in South Africa. They lost the 2nd ODI by 7 wickets. In the 3rd ODI, South Africa were bowled out on 154, courtesy of Taskin Ahmed's five-wicket haul. Bangladesh chased down the target within 26.3 overs and won the match by a comprehensive margin of 9 wickets. As a result, Bangladesh won the series 2–1, giving them their first ODI series win in South Africa.

South Africa won the first test match by 220 runs, while Bangladesh being bowled out on 53 in the fourth innings of the match, recorded their second-lowest total in Test cricket. South Africa won the second test match by 332 runs, winning the series 2–0.

==== Home series vs Sri Lanka ====
Sri Lanka toured Bangladesh in May 2022 to play two Test matches. The Test series formed part of the 2021–2023 ICC World Test Championship.

The first Test ended in a draw, with Sri Lanka winning the second by ten wickets to win the two-match series 1–0.

Following the conclusion of the tour, Mominul Haque resigned as the captain of Bangladesh's Test team.

Bangladesh toured the West Indies in June and July 2022 to play 2 tests, 3 ODIs and 3 T20Is matches. The Test matches formed part of the 2021–2023 ICC World Test Championship. Shakib Al Hasan was named as Bangladesh's new Test captain, with Litton Das being appointed as his deputy.

West Indies won the first Test by seven wickets early on the fourth day, after Bangladesh were bowled out for just 103 runs in their first innings. The West Indies won the second Test by ten wickets to win the series 2–0. The defeat in the second Test was Bangladesh's 100th loss in Test cricket.

The first T20I was delayed by nearly two hours due to a wet outfield. After several rain interruptions, only 13 overs of play was possible, with the match ending in a no result. The following day, the second T20I was played at the same venue, with the West Indies winning by 35 runs. The West Indies won the third and final T20I match by five wickets to win the series 2–0.

Bangladesh won the first ODI match by six wickets to record their first win of the tour. Bangladesh won the second match by nine wickets to win the series with a match to play. Bangladesh won the third ODI match by four wickets to win the series 3–0. Shortly after winning the series, Bangladesh's ODI captain Tamim Iqbal announced his retirement from T20I cricket.

=== 2022 Asian Games and 2023 WC ===
Bangladesh participated in the 2022 Asian Games in 2023 in China.

On 20 October 2023, Bangladesh played against Pakistan in the 3rd place decided in Asian Games which they won by 6 wicket in Hangzou in DLS method to win bronze medal. On the same day, Bangladesh played against Afghanistan in the 2023 ICC Cricket World Cup in Dharmashala which they won by 7 wickets. As a result of these, they became only the 2nd (After Pakistan) team in history to play two different international matches with different XIs on the same day in different venues and first team to win both matches.

==== Home Series Against New Zealand in 2023 ====
The Kiwis toured Bangladesh for 3 ODIs and 2 test matches. In ODI series, the first ODI was abandoned due to rain, while Bangladesh lost the second and third ODIs by 86 runs and 7 wickets, respectively.

In the first test match, Bangladesh achieved a historic victory over New Zealand by 150 runs. Mahmudul Hasan Joy scored a classy 86 in the first innings, while Najmul Hossain Shanto made a splendid hundred in the second innings. Additionally, Taijul Islam took 10 wickets in the match, earning him the 'Man of the Match' title. This win marked Bangladesh's first-ever victory over New Zealand in a test match held in Bangladesh. However, in the second test, Bangladesh lost by 4 wickets.

==== Away series in Sri Lanka in 2025 ====
In July 2025, on the 3rd T20I of the T20I series, Bangladesh won by 8 wickets, 1st T20I series win against Sri Lanka and 1st series win against Sri Lanka in Sri Lanka and Litton become 1st Bangladeshi captain to win two T20I series at away. (Note: 1st one against West Indies)

=== Home T20I series vs Pakistan ===
On 22 July, on the 2nd T20I, Bangladesh won by 8 runs and won T20I series, 1st time of 3-match series against Pakistan.

=== Withdrawal from 2026 Men's T20 World Cup ===
Bangladesh has qualified for every Men's T20 World Cup since its inception in 2007. However, despite also qualifying for the 2026 edition, held in India and Sri Lanka, via qualifying for the Super 8 stage in 2024, Bangladesh would ultimately withdraw from the tournament, after requesting to move their matches from India to Sri Lanka due to tensions between Bangladesh and India, and having that request refused.

== Governing body ==
The Bangladesh Cricket Board (BCB) is the governing body for the Bangladeshi cricket team and the sport in the country. The BCB is responsible for maintaining grounds and promoting the sport. It was founded in 1972 as the Bangladesh Cricket Control Board. Its first constitution was drafted in 1976. The board changed its name, dropping "control" from its title, in January 2007. The president of the BCB is appointed by the government of Bangladesh. The board also controls the team's sponsorship. Since 2003 telecommunications company Grameenphone has sponsored the men and women's national teams. Between 2007 and 2011 they invested ৳151.5 million (US$1.2 million) in developing sport in the country. In 2006 the Board established an academy to encourage the development of young and inexperienced players. The Board issues central contracts to the national players and issuing match fees. In 2005 players were given about $1,000 for each Test they played and $500 per ODI.

== International grounds ==
Locations of all stadiums which have hosted an international cricket match within Bangladesh

Venue	City	Capacity	First used	Tests	ODIs	T20Is
Active Venues
Sher-e-Bangla National Cricket Stadium	Dhaka	26,000	2006	22	113	57
Bir Shrestho Flight Lieutenant Matiur Rahman Cricket Stadium	Chittagong	22,000	2006	21	22	20
Sylhet International Cricket Stadium	Sylhet	18,500	2014	3	4	8
Khulna Divisional Stadium	Khulna	15,000	2006	3	4	5
Shaheed Ria Gope Cricket Stadium	Fatullah	25,000	2006	2	10	4
Former Venues
National Stadium, Dhaka	Dhaka	36,000	1955	17	58	0
District Stadium, Chittagong	Chittagong	30,000	1988	8	10	0
Shaheed Chandu Stadium	Bogra	18,000	2006	1	5	0

Updated: 20 June 2026

== Fan following ==
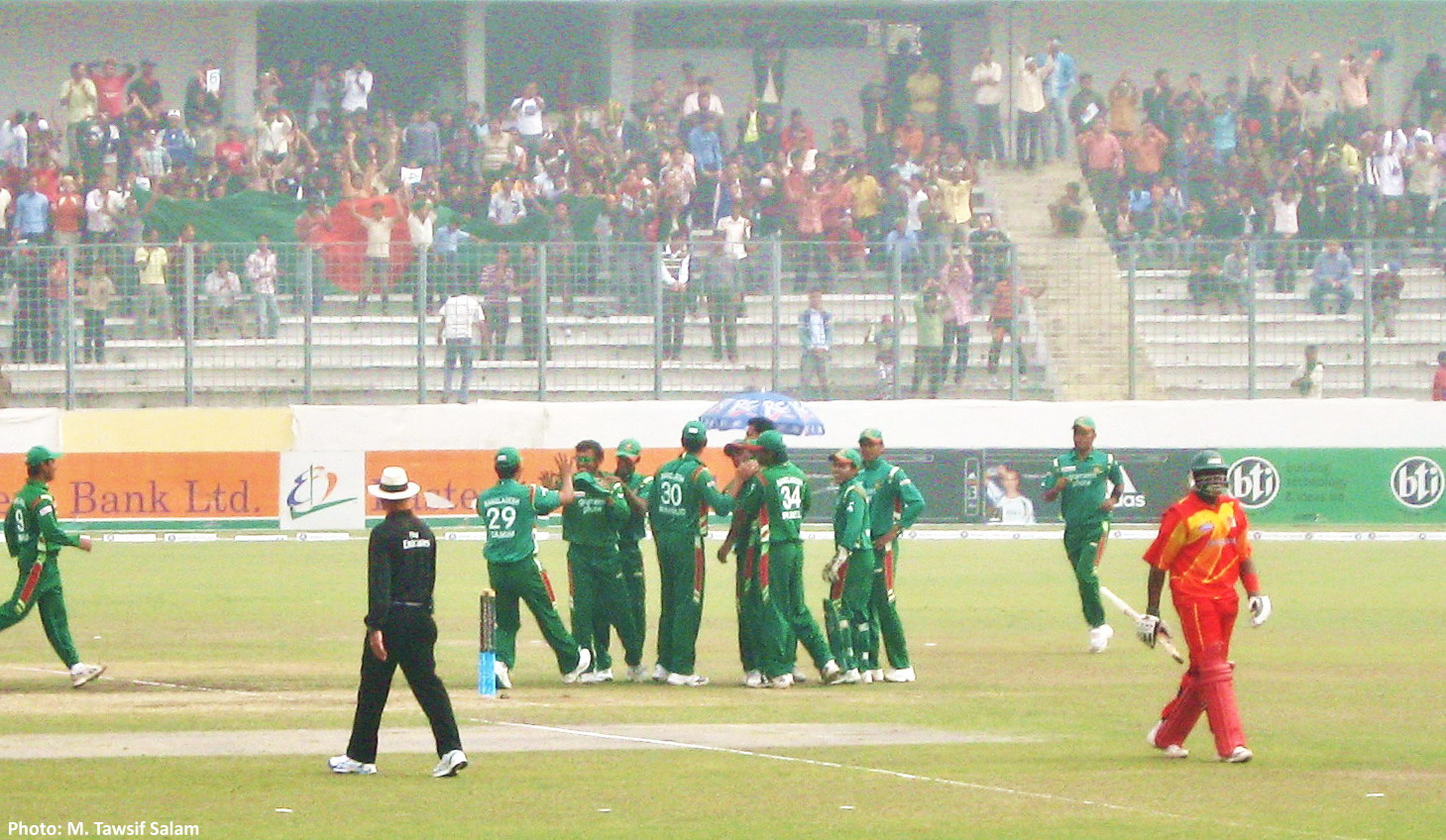
Bangladesh playing against Zimbabwe in 2009. Fans can be seen in the background waving a Bangladesh flag.

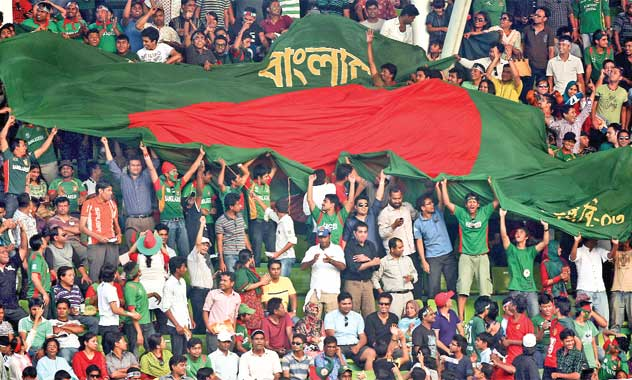
Supporters of the Bangladesh cricket team

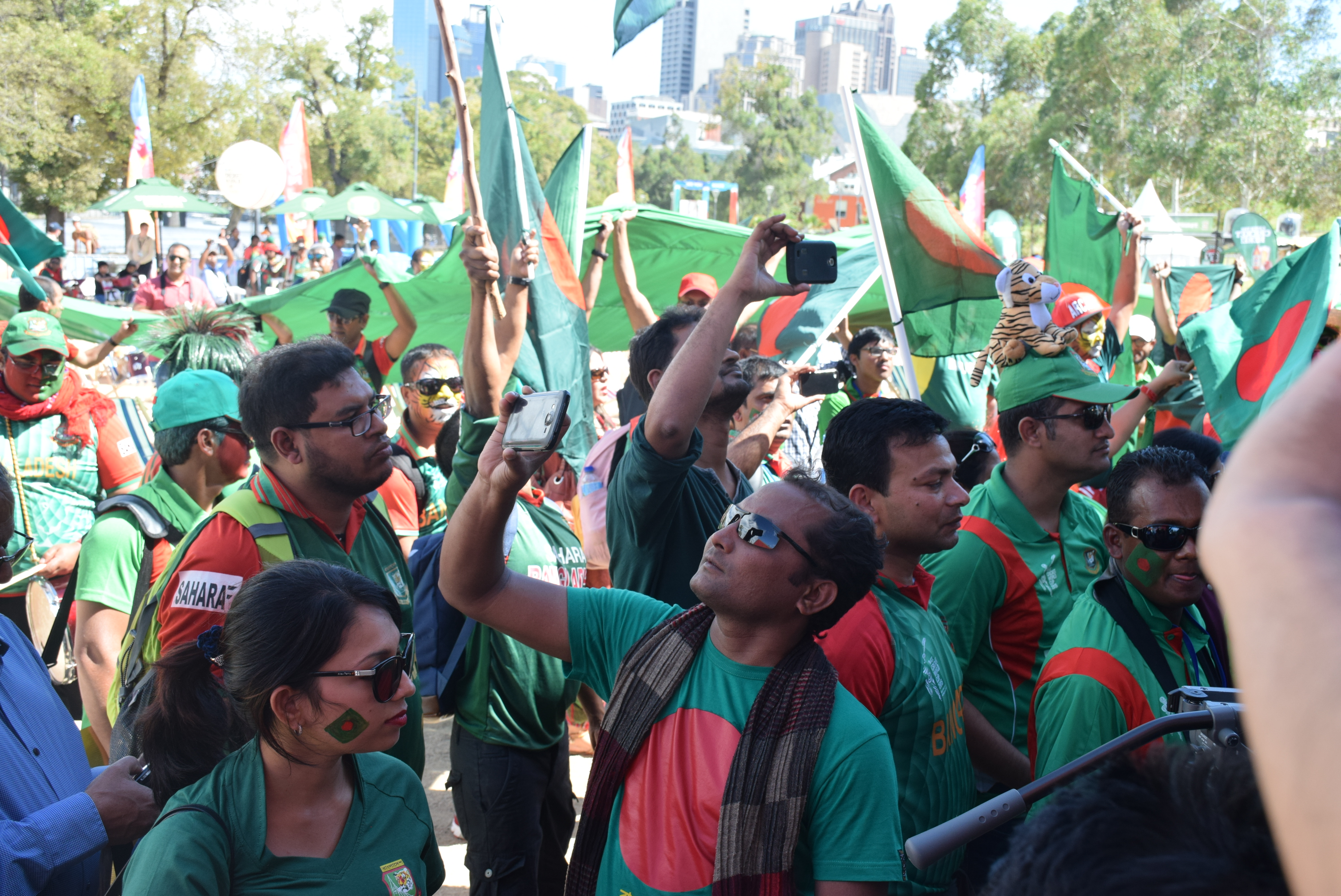
Bangladeshi fans seen in the 2015 ICC Cricket World Cup live site.

Before Bangladesh had even secured Test status, cricket fans in the country took the game seriously; when the team lost an ODI against Kenya in March 1999, several hundred fans protested outside the offices of the Bangladesh Cricket Board (BCB). On learning of Bangladesh's promotion to Test status, thousands of people celebrated on the streets. Then Prime Minister Sheikh Hasina remarked that "I can't express my joy in words at this happiest hour of the nation". At the time cricket was the second-most popular sport in the country behind football. When Bangladesh began its first Test match on 10 November 2000 at Bangabandhu National Stadium in Dhaka, the stadium was nearly full on the first day as around 40,000 people watched the team take on India. As the match partly overlapped with the festival of Shab-e-Barat, numbers attending declined as the match progressed. In 2011, Bangladeshi politician Saber Hossain Chowdhury opined that "In Bangladesh cricket is not simply a game, it is a symbol of national unity", and in the words of AHM Mostofa Kamal, president of the BCB in 2011, "People of Bangladesh take cricket religiously".

The people of Bangladesh are referred as "the most passionate cricket fans" among the cricket world. When Bangladesh are victorious, the fans sometimes take to the streets in celebration. When Bangladesh defeated India in the 2007 World Cup, thousands of people celebrated into the night on the streets of Dhaka despite there being a ban on public gatherings at the time. Although fans are jubilant in victory, they can also be vocal in defeat. When Bangladesh lost to England in an ODI in November 2003, the then captain Khaled Mahmud was booed off the field. During the 2011 World Cup, Bangladesh succumbed to a record defeat against West Indies, registering the team's lowest score in ODIs. Bangladeshi fans booed and stoned the buses of both teams (Bangladesh's intentionally, West Indies' mistakenly), as was Shakib Al Hasan's house.

== Team colours and sponsorship ==
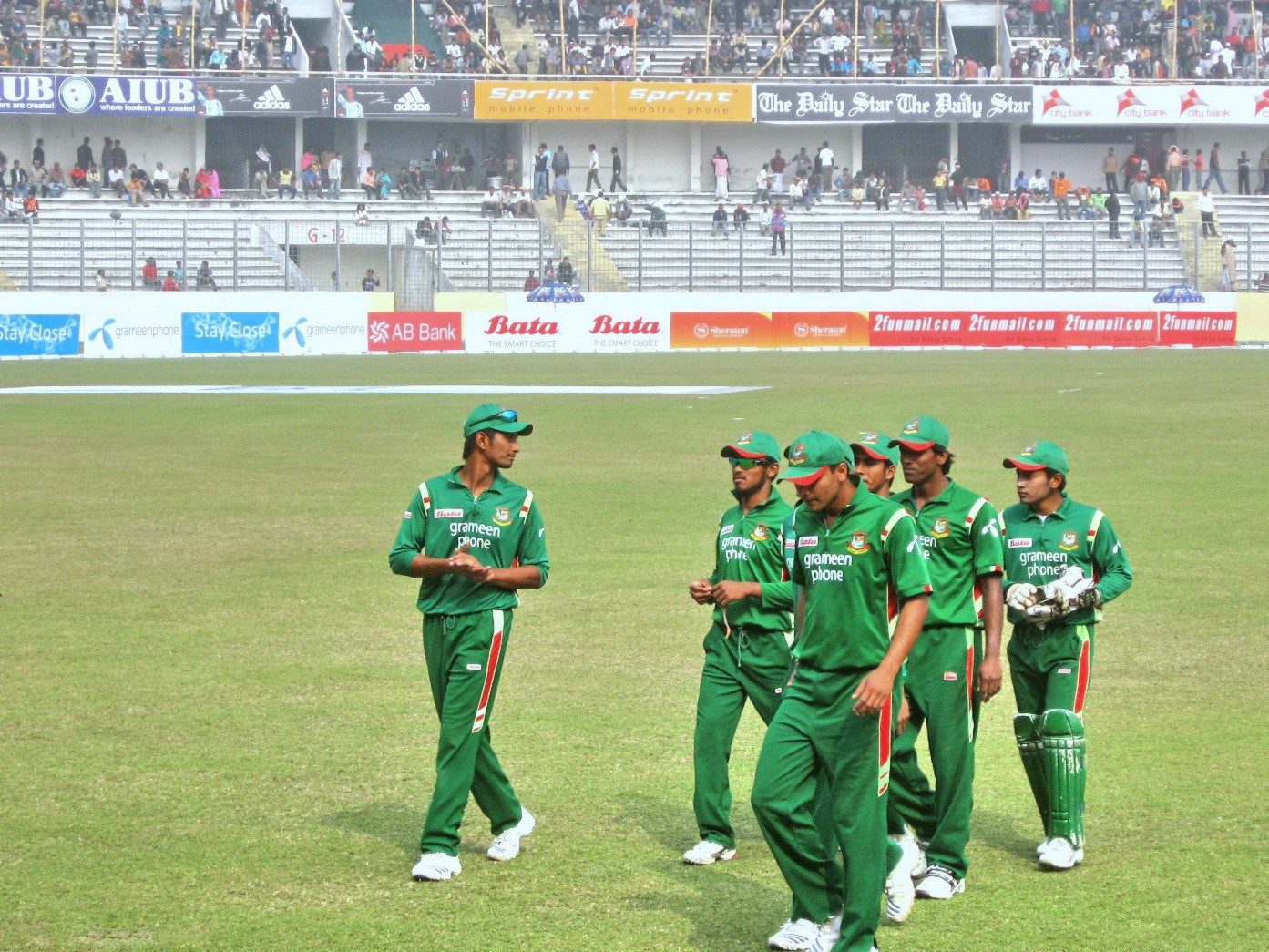
Bangladesh cricket players against Zimbabwe in 2009.

In Test cricket, Bangladesh wears cricket whites, with the BCB logo on the left chest and the sponsor's logo on the right chest. Fielders wear a dark green cap or a white wide brim sunhat. The helmets are also dark green. In limited overs cricket, Bangladesh wears a green uniform with red being the secondary colour and the BCB logo on chest and the sponsor's logo on the centre and "BANGLADESH" written underneath in white letters, with the fielders wearing a green baseball cap with red accents or a green wide-brimmed hat. During ICC tournaments, the sponsor's logo is placed on the left sleeve. In the 1999 Cricket World Cup, Bangladesh wore an olive green uniform with yellow accents and a horizontal stripe with tiger-stripe motif on the chest.

Period/tournament	Kit manufacturer	Sponsor	Sleeve sponsor
1995	—N/a	Pepsi	
1997	—N/a	Biman	
1998	—N/a	Coca-Cola	
1999 Cricket World Cup	Asics	Veetee	
2000–2004	AJ Sports	Beximco	
2003 Cricket World Cup	AJ Sports	Mobil 1	
2005–2008	Ihsan Sports	Grameen Phone	
2009–2011	Bata	Grameen Phone	
2011 Cricket World Cup	—N/a	Beximco	
2012 Asia Cup	—N/a	Neway	
2012–2015	—N/a	Sahara	
2015	—N/a	PRAN Frooto	
2016–2017	—N/a	Robi	BRAC Bank
2018–2020	Avant Garments Ltd.	Uniliver Bangladesh	BRAC Bank
2020	Avant Garments Ltd.	Akash DTH	BRAC Bank
2021	Avant Garments Ltd.	Beximco	Akash DTH
2021	Avant Garments Ltd.	Evaly	e-food
2021–23	Avant Garments Ltd.	Daraz	Hungrynaki
2024–27	Avant Garments Ltd.	Robi	

== Current squad ==
In February 2026, the Board announced the list of 28 central contracts.

This is a list of every active player who is contracted to Bangladesh Cricket Board, has played for Bangladesh since April 2025 or was named in the recent Test, ODI or T20I squads. Uncapped players are listed in italics.

Last updated: 19 February 2026

- Contract – Contract type
- Forms – This refers to the forms they've played for Bangladesh in the past year, not over their whole Bangladesh career
- No. – Shirt number

Name	Age	Batting style	Bowling style	Contract	NCL Division	DPL CLub	Current Franchise	Forms	No.	Notes
Batters
Najmul Hossain Shanto	28	Left	Right arm off break	A	Rajshahi Division	Abahani Limited	Sylhet Strikers	Test, ODI, T20I	99	Test(C)
Towhid Hridoy	25	Right	Right arm off break	B	Rajshahi Division	Abahani Limited	Comilla Victorians	ODI, T20I	77	ODI, T20I (VC)
Mahmudul Hasan Joy	26	Right	Right arm off break	—N/a	Chattogram Division	Abahani Limited	Khulna Tigers	Test, T20I	71	
Tanzid Hasan	25	Left	—N/a	B	Rajshahi Division	Shinepukur	Chattogram Challengers	ODI, T20I	31	
Mominul Haque	35	Left	Slow left-arm orthodox	B	Chattogram Division	Legends of Rupganj	Rangpur Riders	Test	7	
Soumya Sarkar	33	Left	Right-arm medium fast	C	Khulna Division	Mohammedan	Fortune Barishal	ODI, T20I	59	
Shadman Islam	31	Left	Slow left-arm orthodox	B	Dhaka Metropolis	Legends of Rupganj		Test	10	
Saif Hassan	27	Right	Right arm off break	D				ODI, T20I	13	
All-rounders
Mehidy Hasan Miraz	29	Right	Right arm off break	A	Khulna Division	Mohammedan	Fortune Barishal	Test, ODI, T20I	53	Test(VC)
Mahedi Hasan	31	Right	Right arm off break	B	Khulna Division	Prime Bank	Rangpur Riders	ODI, T20I	55	
Shamim Hossain	26	Left	Right arm off break	D	Chattogram Division	Legends of Rupganj	Rangpur Riders	T20I	29	
Mohammad Saifuddin	30	Left	Right-arm medium fast	—N/a				T20I	74	
Wicket-keepers
Mushfiqur Rahim	39	Right	—N/a	B	Rajshahi Division	Prime Bank	Fortune Barishal	Test	15	
Litton Das	32	Right	Right arm off break	A	Rangpur Division	Abahani Limited	Comilla Victorians	Test, ODI, T20I	16	ODI, T20I (C)
Nurul Hasan	33	Right	—N/a	—N/a	Khulna Division	Sheikh Jamal Dhanmondi	Rangpur Riders	Test	18	
Jaker Ali	28	Right	—N/a	C	Sylhet Division	Abahani Limited	Comilla Victorians	Test, T20I	51	
Spin bowlers
Nasum Ahmed	31	Left	Slow left-arm orthodox	D	Sylhet Division	Mohammedan	Khulna Tigers	ODI	10	
Nayeem Hasan	26	Right	Right-arm off break	D	Chattogram Division	Mohammedan	Sylhet Strikers	Test	33	
Rishad Hossain	24	Right	Right-arm leg break	B	Rangpur Division	Shinepukur	Hobart Hurricanes	ODI, T20I	22	
Taijul Islam	34	Left	Slow left-arm orthodox	B	Rajshahi Division	Prime Bank	Fortune Barishal	Test, ODI	12	
Tanvir Islam	30	Left	Slow left-arm orthodox	D				T20I	69	
Pace bowlers
Shoriful Islam	25	Left	Left-arm fast-medium	C	Rajshahi Division	Abahani Limited	Durdanto Dhaka	Test, ODI, T20I	47	
Taskin Ahmed	31	Left	Right-arm fast	A		Abahani Limited	Sharjah Warriors	Test, ODI, T20I	3	
Mustafizur Rahman	31	Left	Left-arm fast-medium	B			Dubai Capitals	ODI, T20I	90	
Tanzim Hasan Sakib	24	Right	Right-arm fast-medium	C		Abahani Limited	Sylhet Strikers	ODI, T20I	41	
Khaled Ahmed	34	Right	Right-arm medium	C	Sylhet Division	Abahani Limited	Fortune Barishal	Test, T20I	14	
Hasan Mahmud	27	Right	Right-arm fast-medium	D	Chattogram Division	Prime Bank	Rangpur Riders	Test, ODI, T20I	91	
Nahid Rana	24	Right	Right-arm fast	B	Rajshahi Division	Shinepukur	Khulna Tigers	Test	45	

=== Salary and match fees ===
After announcing the central list, BCB also increased the salary of the contracted players as well as the match fees, since 2020. According to the new pay structure, contracted players will be paid the following salary according to their respective category.

Category	Salary
A+	৳10 lakh (US$8,100) monthly or, ৳1.2 crore (US$98,000) annually
A	৳8 lakh (US$6,500) monthly or, ৳96 lakh (US$78,000) annually
B	৳6 lakh (US$4,900) monthly or, ৳72 lakh (US$59,000) annually
C	৳4 lakh (US$3,300) monthly or, ৳48 lakh (US$39,000) annually
D	৳2 lakh (US$1,600) monthly or, ৳24 lakh (US$20,000) annually

In addition to this, the players' match fees were also increased to ৳8 lakh (US$6,500) for each Test match, ৳4 lakh (US$3,300) for each ODI, and ৳2.5 lakh (US$2,000) for each T20I match.

== Coaching staff ==
Position	Name
Team Manager	(Bangladesh) Nafees Iqbal
Head coach	(Trinidad and Tobago) Phil Simmons
Assistant coach	(South Africa) Malibongwe Maketa
Batting coach	(Bangladesh) Mohammad Salahuddin (Interim)
Spin Bowling coach	(Pakistan) Mushtaq Ahmed
Pace Bowling coach	(Bangladesh) Talha Jubair (Interim)
Fielding coach	(Bangladesh) Ashikur Rahman Mojumdar (Interim)
Strength and Conditioning coach	(Bangladesh) Iftikhairul Islam
Performance Analyst	(India) Akshay Hiremath

=== Head coach history ===
Years	Name
1997–1999	(Barbados) Gordon Greenidge
1999–2000	(South Africa) Eddie Barlow
2000	(Bangladesh) Sarwar Imran
2001–2002	(Australia) Trevor Chappell
2002–2003	(Pakistan) Mohsin Kamal
2003	(Bangladesh) Sarwar Imran (interim)
2003–2007	(Australia) Dav Whatmore
2007	(New Zealand) Shaun Williams (interim)
2007–2011	(Australia) Jamie Siddons
2011	(Australia) Stuart Law
2011–2012	(England) Richard Pybus
2012–2014	(Australia) Shane Jurgensen
2014–2017	(Sri Lanka) Chandika Hathurusingha
2018	(Jamaica) Courtney Walsh (interim)
2018	(Zimbabwe) Richard Halsall (interim)
2018–2019	(England) Steve Rhodes
2019	(Bangladesh) Khaled Mahmud (interim)
2019–2022	(South Africa) Russell Domingo
2023–2024	(Sri Lanka) Chandika Hathurusingha
2024–present	(Trinidad and Tobago) Phil Simmons

== Tournament history ==
=== Cricket World Cup ===
Men's Cricket World Cup record									Qualification record				
Host/Year	Result	Pos	№	Pld	W	L	T	NR	Pld	W	L	T	NR
(England) 1975	Not eligible								Not an ICC Member				
(England) 1979	Did not qualify								4	2	2	0	0
(England) (Wales) 1983	Did not qualify								7	4	1	0	2
(India) (Pakistan) 1987	Did not qualify								6	2	4	0	0
(Australia) (New Zealand) 1992	Did not qualify								7	5	2	0	0
(India) (Sri Lanka) (Pakistan) 1996	Did not qualify								7	4	3	0	0
(England) (Wales) (Scotland) (Republic of Ireland) (Netherlands) 1999	Group stage	9th	12	5	2	3	0	0	10	9	0	0	1
(South Africa) (Zimbabwe) (Kenya) 2003	Group stage	13th	14	6	0	5	0	1	Qualified as ICC full member				
(Cricket West Indies) 2007	Super 8	7th	16	9	3	6	0	0	Qualified as ICC full member				
(India) (Sri Lanka) (Bangladesh) 2011	Group stage	9th	14	6	3	3	0	0	Qualified as ICC full member				
(Australia) (New Zealand) 2015	Quarter final	7th	14	7	3	3	0	1	Qualified as ICC full member				
(England) (Wales) 2019	Group stage	8th	10	9	3	5	0	1	Qualified via ICC Rankings (7th place)				
(India) 2023	Group stage	8th	10	9	2	7	0	0	24	15	8	0	1
(South Africa) (Zimbabwe) (Namibia) 2027	Qualified								Qualified via ICC Rankings (9th place)				
(India) (Bangladesh) 2031	Qualified as co-hosts								Qualified directly as hosts				
Total	0 titles			51	16	32	0	3	65	41	21	0	4

=== T20 World Cup ===
Men's Twenty20 World Cup record
Host/Year	Result	Pos	№	Pld	W	L	T	NR
(South Africa) 2007	Super 8	8th	12	5	1	4	0	0
(England) 2009	Group stage	10th	12	2	0	2	0	0
(Cricket West Indies) 2010	Group stage	10th	12	2	0	2	0	0
(Sri Lanka) 2012	Group stage	9th	12	2	0	2	0	0
(Bangladesh) 2014	Super 10	10th	16	7	2	5	0	0
(India) 2016	Super 10	10th	16	7	2	4	0	1
(United Arab Emirates) (Oman) 2021	Super 12	11th	16	8	2	6	0	0
(Australia) 2022	Super 12	9th	16	5	2	3	0	0
(Cricket West Indies) (United States) 2024	Super 8	7th	20	7	3	4	0	0
(India) (Sri Lanka) 2026	Withdrew							
(Australia) (New Zealand) 2028	Qualified via ICC Rankings							
(England) (Wales) (Republic of Ireland) (Scotland) 2030	To be determined							
Total	0 titles			44	12	31	0	1

=== World Test Championship ===
World Test Championship record
Host/Year	Result	Pos	№	Pld	W	L	D	PCT
(England) 2019/2021	Group stage	9th	9	7	0	6	1	4.8
(England) 2021/2023	Group stage	9th	9	12	1	10	1	11
(England) 2023/2025	Group stage	7th	9	12	4	8	0	31.3
(England) 2025/2027	In progress	4th*	9	6	3	2	1	55.6
Total	0 titles			37	8	26	3	-

=== Champions Trophy ===
Men's Champions Trophy record
Host/Year	Result	Pos	№	Pld	W	L	T	NR
(Bangladesh) 1998	Not eligible							
(Kenya) 2000	First round	10th	11	1	0	1	0	0
(Sri Lanka) 2002	Group stage	11th	12	2	0	2	0	0
(England) 2004	Group stage	11th	12	2	0	2	0	0
(India) 2006	First round	9th	12	3	1	2	0	0
(South Africa) 2009	Did not qualify							
(England) (Wales) 2013	Did not qualify							
(England) (Wales) 2017	Semi final	4th	8	4	1	2	0	1
(Pakistan) (United Arab Emirates) 2025	Group stage	6th	8	3	0	2	0	1
(India) 2029	To be determined							
Total	0 titles			15	2	11	0	2

=== Asia Cup ===
Men's Asia Cup record
Host/Year	Result	Pos	№	Pld	W	L	T	NR
(United Arab Emirates) 1984	Did not participate							
(Sri Lanka) 1986	Group stage	3rd	3	2	0	2	0	0
(Bangladesh) 1988	Group stage	4th	4	3	0	3	0	0
(India) 1990	Group stage	3rd	3	2	0	2	0	0
(United Arab Emirates) 1995	Group stage	4th	4	3	0	3	0	0
(Sri Lanka) 1997	Group stage	4th	4	3	0	3	0	0
(Bangladesh) 2000	Group stage	4th	4	3	0	3	0	0
(Sri Lanka) 2004	Super 4	4th	6	5	1	4	0	0
(Pakistan) 2008	Super 4	4th	6	5	1	4	0	0
(Sri Lanka) 2010	Group stage	4th	4	3	0	3	0	0
(Bangladesh) 2012	Runner up	2nd	4	4	2	2	0	0
(Bangladesh) 2014	Group stage	5th	5	4	0	4	0	0
(Bangladesh) 2016	Runner up	2nd	5	5	3	2	0	0
(United Arab Emirates) 2018	Runner up	2nd	6	6	3	3	0	0
(United Arab Emirates) 2022	Group stage	5th	6	2	0	2	0	0
(Sri Lanka) (Pakistan) 2023	Super 4	3rd	6	5	2	3	0	0
(United Arab Emirates) 2025	Super 4	3rd	8	6	3	3	0	0
(Bangladesh) 2027	Qualified							
Total	0 titles			61	15	48	0	0

=== Commonwealth Games ===
Commonwealth Games record
Period	Result	Pos	№	Pld	W	L	T	NR
(Malaysia) 1998	Group stage	14th	16	3	0	3	0	0
Total	0 medals			3	0	3	0	0

=== Olympics Games ===
Summer Olympics record
Period	Result	Pos	№	Pld	W	L	T	NR
(France) 1900	Part of British India							
(United States) 2028	To be determined							
(Australia) 2032	To be determined							
Total	0 medals			0	0	0	0	0

=== Asian Games ===
All matches of 2010 and 2014 seasons were counted as T20s. Since the announcement of T-20 matches between all members having international status from 1 January 2019, all matches from the 2022 season onward are granted as T20Is.

Asian Games record
Period	Result	Pos	№	Pld	W	L	T	NR
(China) 2010	Gold	1st	11	3	3	0	0	0
(South Korea) 2014	Bronze	3rd	13	3	2	0	0	1
(China) 2022	Bronze	3rd	15	3	2	1	0	0
(Japan) 2026	Qualified							
Total	3 medals			9	7	1	0	1

=== ACC Trophy ===
ACC Trophy record
Period	Result	Pos	№	Pld	W	L	T	NR
(Malaysia) 1996	Champions	1st	12	7	7	0	0	0
(Nepal) 1998	Champions	1st	10	6	5	0	0	1
Total	2 titles			13	12	0	0	1

== Honours ==
=== ACC ===
- Asia Cup
  - Runners-up (3): 2012, 2016, 2018

=== Others ===
- Asian Games
  - Gold Medal (1): 2010
  - Bronze Medal (2): 2014, 2022
- South Asian Games
  - Gold Medal (2): 2010, 2019

== Records ==
- Players listed in **bold** are still playing.

International match summary – Bangladesh

Playing record
Format	M	W	L	T	D/NR	W%	First match
Test matches	165	28	116	0	21	17.07%	10 November 2000
One-Day Internationals	469	170	288	1	10	37.03%	31 March 1986
Twenty20 Internationals	222	89	128	0	5	40.09%	28 November 2006
Last updated 19 November 2026

=== Test matches ===
- Highest team total: 638 v. Sri Lanka, 8–12 March 2013 at Galle
- Lowest team total : 43 v. West Indies, 4–8 July 2018 at North Sound
- Highest individual score: 219*, Mushfiqur Rahim v. Zimbabwe, 12 November 2018 at Dhaka
- Most individual runs in a match: 281, Mominul Haque (176 and 105) v. Sri Lanka, 2018 at Chittagong
- Best individual bowling figures in an innings: 8/39, Taijul Islam v. Zimbabwe, 25–27 October 2014 at Dhaka
- Best individual bowling figures in a match: 12/117, Mehedi Hasan Miraz (7/59 and 5/58) v. West Indies, 30 November- 2 December 2018 at Dhaka

**Most Test runs for Bangladesh**

Player	Runs	Average	Career span
**Mushfiqur Rahim**	7040	39.11	2005–2026
**Mominul Haque**	5293	37.53	2013–2026
Tamim Iqbal	5134	38.89	2008–2023
Shakib Al Hasan	4609	37.77	2007–2024
**Litton Das**	3564	36.00	2015–2026

**Most Test wickets for Bangladesh**

Player	Wickets	Average	Career span
**Taijul Islam**	277	31.43	2014–2026
Shakib Al Hasan	246	31.72	2007–2024
**Mehedi Hasan Miraz**	235	31.94	2016–2026
Mohammad Rafique	100	40.76	2000–2008
Mashrafe Mortaza	78	41.52	2001–2009

Test record versus other nations

Opponent	Span	M	W	L	T	D	Win %	First win
Afghanistan	2019–2026	3	1	1	1	0	33.33%	17 June 2023
Australia	2003–2026	8	2	6	0	0	25.00%	30 August 2017
England	2003–2016	10	1	9	0	0	10.00%	30 October 2016
India	2000–2024	15	0	13	0	2	0.00%	
Ireland	2023–2025	3	3	0	0	0	100.00%	7 April 2023
New Zealand	2001–2023	19	2	14	0	3	10.52%	5 January 2022
Pakistan	2001–2026	17	4	12	0	1	23.52%	25 August 2024
South Africa	2002–2026	17	0	15	0	2	0.00%	
Sri Lanka	2001–2025	28	1	21	0	6	3.70%	19 March 2017
West Indies	2002–2026	24	5	16	0	3	20.83%	13 July 2009
Zimbabwe	2001–2026	21	9	9	0	3	42.85%	10 January 2005
Totals	2000–2026	165	28	116	0	21	W%: 16.96%	
Statistics are correct as of Bangladesh v South Africa at Wanderers Stadium, Johannesburg, First Test, 15–19 November 2026

=== One-Day Internationals ===
- Highest team total: 349/6 v. Ireland, 20 March 2023 at Sylhet.
- Lowest team total: 58 v. West Indies, 4 March 2011 and v. India, 17 June 2014 at Dhaka.
- Highest individual score: 176, Liton Das v. Zimbabwe, 6 March 2020 at Sylhet.
- Best individual bowling figures: 6/26, Mashrafe Mortaza v. Kenya, 15 August 2006 at Nairobi (Gymkhana) and Rubel Hossain v. New Zealand, 29 October 2013 at Dhaka.

**Most ODI runs for Bangladesh**

Player	Runs	Average	Career span
Tamim Iqbal	8357	36.65	2007–2023
Mushfiqur Rahim	7793	36.75	2006–2024
**Shakib Al Hasan**	7570	37.29	2006–2023
Mahmudullah	5685	36.67	2007–2024
Mohammad Ashraful	3468	22.37	2001–2013

**Most ODI wickets for Bangladesh**

Player	Wickets	Average	Career span
**Shakib Al Hasan**	317	29.52	2006–2023
Mashrafe Mortaza	269	32.65	2001–2020
Abdur Razzak	207	29.29	2004–2014
**Mustafizur Rahman**	194	26.55	2015–2026
**Taskin Ahmed**	142	28.50	2014–2026

ODI record versus other nations

Opponent	Span	M	W	L	T	NR	Win %	First win
v. Full members (Test nations)
Afghanistan	2014–2026	23	11	12	0	0	47.82%	18 February 2015
Australia	1990–2026	25	3	21	0	1	12.50%	18 June 2005
England	2000–2023	25	5	20	0	0	20.00%	10 July 2010
India	1988–2025	42	8	33	0	1	19.51%	26 December 2004
Ireland	2007–2023	16	11	2	0	3	84.62%	18 March 2008
New Zealand	1990–2026	49	13	35	0	1	27.08%	9 October 2008
Pakistan	1986–2026	42	7	35	0	0	16.66%	31 May 1999
South Africa	2002–2023	25	6	19	0	0	24.00%	7 April 2007
Sri Lanka	1986–2025	60	13	45	0	2	22.41%	22 February 2006
West Indies	1999–2025	50	23	24	1	2	46.00%	26 July 2009
Zimbabwe	1997–2026	85	52	33	0	0	61.17%	10 March 2004
v. Associate Members
Bermuda	2007–2007	2	2	0	0	0	100.00%	25 February 2007
Canada	2003–2007	2	1	1	0	0	50.00%	28 February 2007
Hong Kong	2004–2004	1	1	0	0	0	100.00%	16 July 2004
Kenya	1997–2006	14	8	6	0	0	57.14%	17 May 1998
Netherlands	2010–2023	3	1	2	0	0	33.33%	14 March 2011
Scotland	1999–2015	4	4	0	0	0	100.00%	24 May 1999
United Arab Emirates	2008–2008	1	1	0	0	0	100.00%	24 June 2008
Statistics are correct as of Bangladesh v Afghanistan at Sharjah Cricket Stadium, Sharjah; 21 October 2026.

=== Twenty20 Internationals ===
- Highest team total: 215/5 v. Sri Lanka, 10 March 2018 at Colombo
- Highest individual score: 103*, Tamim Iqbal v. Oman, 13 March 2016 at Dharamsala
- Best individual bowling figures: 6/10, Mustafizur Rahman v. United States, 25 May 2024 at Houston

**Most T20I runs for Bangladesh**

Player	Runs	Average	Career span
**Litton Das**	2704	23.11	2015–2026
**Shakib Al Hasan**	2551	23.19	2006–2024
Mahmudullah	2444	23.50	2007–2024
Tamim Iqbal	1701	24.65	2007–2020
Mushfiqur Rahim	1500	19.48	2006–2022

**Most T20I wickets for Bangladesh**

Player	Wickets	Average	Career span
**Mustafizur Rahman**	163	21.14	2015–2025
**Shakib Al Hasan**	149	20.91	2006–2024
**Taskin Ahmed**	103	21.73	2014–2024
**Rishad Hossain**	82	21.43	2023–2026
**Mahedi Hasan**	78	23.69	2018–2026

T20I record versus other nations

Opponent	Span	M	W	L	T	NR	Win %	First win
v. Test nations
Afghanistan	2014–2025	16	9	7	0	0	56.25%	16 March 2014
Australia	2007–2026	14	4	10	0	0	28.57%	3 August 2021
England	2021–2023	4	3	1	0	0	75.00%	9 March 2023
India	2009–2025	18	1	17	0	0	5.88%	3 November 2019
Ireland	2009–2025	11	7	3	0	1	70.00%	18 July 2012
New Zealand	2010–2026	22	5	16	0	1	23.80%	1 September 2021
Pakistan	2007–2026	25	5	20	0	0	20.00%	24 April 2015
South Africa	2007–2024	9	0	9	0	0	0.00%	
Sri Lanka	2007–2025	23	9	14	0	0	39.13%	28 February 2016
West Indies	2007–2025	22	8	12	0	2	40.00%	13 September 2007
Zimbabwe	2006–2026	28	19	9	0	0	67.85%	28 November 2006
v. Associate Members
Hong Kong	2014–2025	2	1	1	0	0	50.00%	11 September 2025
Kenya	2007–2007	1	1	0	0	0	100.00%	1 September 2007
Malaysia	2023–2023	1	1	0	0	0	100.00%	4 October 2023
Nepal	2014–2024	2	2	0	0	0	100.00%	18 March 2014
Netherlands	2012–2025	8	6	1	0	1	85.71%	25 July 2012
Oman	2016–2021	2	2	0	0	0	100.00%	13 March 2016
Papua New Guinea	2021–2021	1	1	0	0	0	100.00%	29 October 2021
Scotland	2012–2021	2	0	2	0	0	0.00%	
United Arab Emirates	2016–2025	6	4	2	0	0	66.66%	26 February 2016
United States	2024–2024	3	1	2	0	0	33.33%	25 May 2024
Statistics are correct as of Bangladesh v Sri Lanka at Kōrogi Sports Park, Nisshin; 3 October 2026.

== World records ==
=== As a team ===
- Most consecutive Test defeats : 21 (2001–2004).
- Most consecutive Test series defeats : 16 (2000/01–2004–05).
- Most consecutive ODI defeats : 23 (1999–2002).
- Most consecutive ODIs without victory : 47 (1999–2003).
- 3rd country (Note: Others are Australia and Pakistan) to win their 100th match in Tests, ODIs and T20Is.
- Only Test team to lose their first ODI played against five non-Test teams (Canada 2003, Kenya 2003, Ireland 2007, Netherlands 2010 and Afghanistan 2014).
- The highest innings total in a losing cause : 595/8 dec. vs New Zealand in 2017.
- The least time among all 10 Test-playing countries—to reach the landmark figure of playing 100 tests : 16 years and 12 days.
- First team to get 6 ducks in an innings in consecutive Tests and also the only team to achieve it more than once in Test cricket's history.
  (1st and 3rd vs West Indies in 2002 and 2022 respectively and 2nd vs Sri Lanka.)
- The first-ever team to win two international matches in two different formats on the same day.

=== By Bangladeshi players ===
- Only the third cricketer (Note: out of 4:Charles Bannerman (Australia), Dave Houghton (Zimbabwe) and Kevin O'Brien (Ireland)) to score a century in their country's inaugural test : Aminul Islam (in 2000 against India).
- Youngest cricketer to make a Test century: Mohammad Ashraful (17 years and 61 days : 114 against Sri Lanka at Colombo on 8 September 2001).
- Youngest bowler to take a 10 wicket haul in Tests : Enamul Haque Jr. (18 years 40 days : against Zimbabwe in 2005).
- Leading wicket-taker in ODIs in 2006 : Mashrafe Mortaza (49 wickets in 27 matches).
- Only the 2nd Test cricketer in history to make a century at number 10 on debut: Abul Hasan (On 21 November 2012 against the West Indies at Khulna).
- The first cricketer ever to score a century and take a hat-trick in the same Test match : Sohag Gazi (On 13 October 2013 against New Zealand at Chittagong)
- Only the 3rd (Note: after Ian Botham (England) and Imran Khan (Pakistan)) cricketer to score a century and get 10 wickets in a test match : Shakib Al Hasan (in 2014)
- The first bowler in ODI history to claim a hat-trick on debut : Taijul Islam (On 1 December 2014 against Zimbabwe)
- The first player in history to hold the number 1 positions in all three formats of cricket, in the all-rounder category : Shakib Al Hasan (On 12 January 2015)
- The first cricketer ever to take 11 wickets in his first two ODIs : Mustafizur Rahman (5/50 and 6/43 against India in June 2015 at Dhaka).
- The only players to get the Man of the match in two formats of the international cricket as a debutant : Elias Sunny (in Test vs West Indies in 2011 & T20I vs Ireland in 2012) and Mustafizur Rahman (in ODI vs India) and in Test vs South Africa both in 2015.
- The first cricketer to take the double of 100 wickets and 1,000 runs in T20Is : Shakib Al Hasan (In August 2021 against Australia)
- The first cricketer to take the double of 2500 runs and 100 wickets in T20Is : Shakib Al Hasan (In June 2024 against Nederlands in ICC T20 World Cup 2024)
- The first and only player to achieve 9 dismissals as a wicketkeeper and scoring a century and a fifty in the same test- Litton Das (53 and 102, against Afghanistan in Abu Dhabi)

== See also ==
- Bangladesh Premier League
- Bangladesh national women's cricket team
- Bangladesh national under-19 cricket team
- List of Bangladesh national cricket captains
- Bangladesh–Sri Lanka cricket rivalry
- Bangladesh Cricket Board

== Notes ==
Preceded by Zimbabwe	Test match playing teams 10 November 2000	Succeeded by Ireland
