= Shaun Williams =

Shaun Williams may refer to:

- Shaun Williams (American football) (born 1976), safety
- Shaun Williams (cricket coach) (born 1970), Australian coach of Bangladesh
- Shaun Williams (DJ), British DJ and jazz dancer
- Shaun Williams (footballer) (born 1986), Irish footballer
- Shaun Williams (rugby union), South African rugby union player
- Shaun Williams (wrestler) (born 1976), South African freestyle wrestler

== See also ==
- Sean Williams (disambiguation)
