= Sarwar Imran =

Bangladeshi cricket coach

Sarwar Imran is a Bangladeshi cricket coach. He was head coach of Bangladesh Krira Shikkha Protishtan from 1987 to 1997.

He started his coaching career in 1984 and has played served as head coach of various teams in premier division cricket, the main domestic ODI competition in Bangladesh. From 2000 to December 2011, he was the head cricket coach of High Performance Unit of Bangladesh National Cricket Academy. Under his coaching, Bangladesh won its first ever gold in 2010 Asian Games.

Imran was the head coach of the Bangladesh national cricket team when it played its first-ever Test match in 2000. He was the interim coach in 2003 following the sacking of Mohsin Kamal. From 1997 to 2012, Imran was either head or assistant coach of the Bangladesh national cricket team.

In the first two editions of Bangladesh Premier League, he was head coach of the Barisal Burners. Recently, he has been appointed assistant coach of Bangladesh national cricket team for the India series in June where he will be assisting the newly appointed head Coach Chandika Hathurusingha. He is the coach of Minister Group Rajshahi in Bangabandhu T20 Cup 2020.

Sarwar Imran was appointed head coach of the Bangladesh women's team in February 2025.
