= Sean Williams =

Sean or Shawn Williams may refer to:

- Sean Williams (author) (born 1967), Australian author
- Sean Williams (basketball) (born 1986), American basketball player
- Sean Williams (cricketer) (born 1986), Zimbabwean all-rounder
- Sean Williams (ethnomusicologist) (born 1959), American college professor
- Sean Williams (ice hockey) (born 1968), Canadian ice hockey center
- Sean Price Williams (born 1977), American cinematographer
- Shawn Williams (lacrosse) (born 1974), Canadian lacrosse player
- Shawn Williams (American football) (born 1991), American football player
- Shawn Williams, 7-year-old child murdered in 1993. Colin Hatch was convicted for the murder

== See also ==
- Shaun Williams (disambiguation)
- Shawne Williams (born 1986), American basketball player
