= Shaun Williams (cricket coach) =

Australian cricket coach

Shaun Williams (born 16 January 1974) is a former Australian international cricket coach. Born in Bendigo, Victoria, he was interim coach of Bangladesh in 2007 while the Bangladesh Cricket Board looked for a permanent successor for Dav Whatmore. Williams coached the team for a tour of Sri Lanka and the 2007 World T20. He was succeeded as Bangladesh coach by Jamie Siddons, and, following his time with Bangladesh, he was coach of Maharashtra between 2008 and 2012.
