= Aavishkar Salvi =

Indian cricketer (born 1981)

Personal information
- Full name: Aavishkar Madhav Salvi
- Born: 20 October 1981 (age 45); Bombay, Maharashtra, India
- Height: 6 ft 0 in (1.83 m)
- Batting: Right-handed
- Bowling: Right-arm fast-medium
- Role: Bowler

International information
- National side: India (2003)
- ODI debut (cap 150): 11 April 2003 v Bangladesh
- Last ODI: 18 November 2003 v Australia
- ODI shirt no.: 4

Domestic team information
- Years: Team
- 2001–2013: Mumbai
- 2009–2011: Delhi Daredevils

Career statistics
| Competition | ODI | FC | LA | T20 |
|---|---|---|---|---|
| Matches | 4 | 62 | 52 | 19 |
| Runs scored | 4 | 306 | 54 | 16 |
| Batting average | 2.00 | 10.92 | 6.75 | – |
| 100s/50s | 0/0 | 0/0 | 0/0 | 0/0 |
| Top score | 4* | 25 | 20* | 10* |
| Balls bowled | 172 | 10,343 | 2,475 | 389 |
| Wickets | 4 | 169 | 71 | 18 |
| Bowling average | 30.00 | 25.72 | 26.30 | 29.27 |
| 5 wickets in innings | 0 | 7 | 1 | 0 |
| 10 wickets in match | 0 | 1 | 0 | 0 |
| Best bowling | 2/15 | 5/31 | 5/45 | 3/28 |
| Catches/stumpings | 2/– | 23/– | 17/– | 5/– |
- Source: CricketArchive, 21 February 2017

Aavishkar Madhav Salvi (born 20 October 1981) is a former Indian cricketer. He played a right-arm medium-pace bowler and right-handed batsman. In first-class cricket, he played for Mumbai. His last match for Mumbai was in 2013. He also played for Delhi Daredevils in the IPL.

With a bowling style similar to Glenn McGrath's, employment of similar line and length and top-notch seam-bowling brought Salvi up from relative obscurity, as backup seamer for his club, to the national team in less than a year, and several Ranji Trophy appearances for his club.

Salvi is currently the fast bowling coach for Oman (on an assignment basis). He started his coaching career as the head coach of Puducherry in 2018 post his retirement. He was reappointed as the head coach for Puducherry cricket team in 2020 owing to the team's good performance under him in his first stint.

In 2022, he was appointed as the head coach for Punjab cricket team. In his second season with them, he helped them win their first Syed Mushtaq Ali Trophy title. It was Punjab's first domestic title in 30 years. He also led to the recent victory of the Indian Women's Team in the World Cup.
