= Veetee Rice =

British rice merchant

Veetee Rice Limited
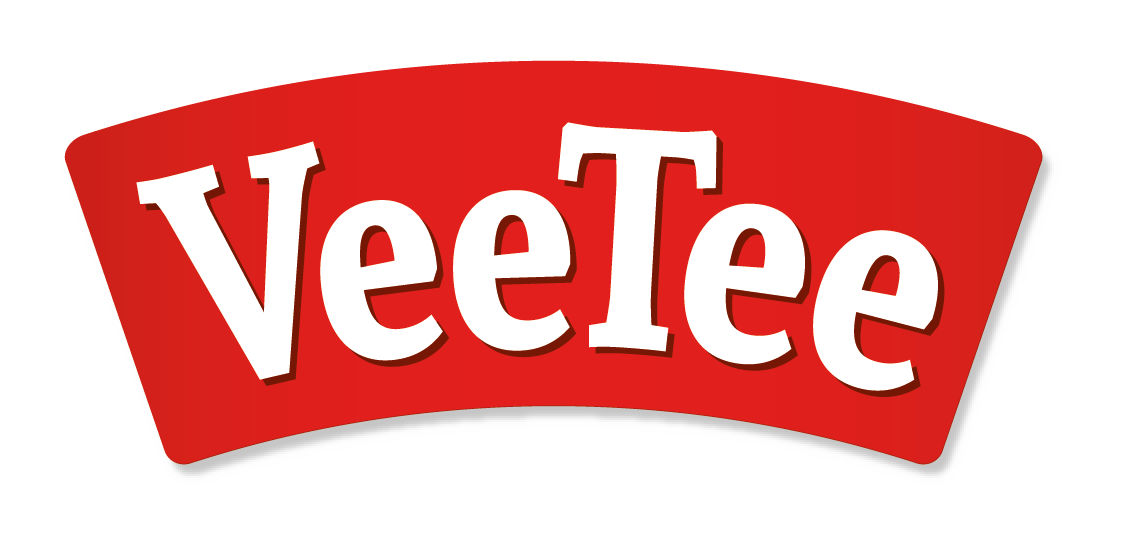
- Company type: Private Limited
- Industry: Rice
- Founded: 1987; 39 years ago
- Founder: Moni Varma
- Headquarters: Rochester, Kent, England
- Products: Basmati; Long-grain rice; Camargue red rice
- Number of employees: 150+
- Website: www.veetee.com

Veetee Rice Limited is a British rice merchant, headquartered in Rochester, Kent. The company supplies rice to major supermarkets in the UK and globally, and imports its rice from India, Pakistan, America, and Thailand.

Today, the company offers a wide variety of rice types such as basmati, long grain, Goan, Camargue red, rozana and microwaveable rice.

== History ==
Veetee was founded in 1987 by Moni Varma in Perivale, a suburb in the London Borough of Ealing. Varma's idea for Veetee was influenced by family-run rice farms in India when a relative asked him to import basmati rice to Britain. The company’s first rice mill in Perivale, included two silos, which enabled the company to import unmilled brown rice with lower duties.

In 1990, VeeTee relocated to Rochester. Around this time, the company decided to build a factory in India, where much of the harvested rice is grown.

In 2007, Veetee launched its range of microwaveable rice, at the time called Dine In. The product was awarded the Grocer New Product Award because of its pioneering production method. In 2011, Veetee was listed as the 8th fastest growing company in the UK in the Sunday Times Fast Track 100.

In July 2022, Veetee partnered with DS Smith to design a resealable rice pack that is recyclable.
