= Mohsin Kamal =

Pakistani cricketer (born 1963)

Personal information
- Born: 16 June 1963 (age 63); Faisalabad, Punjab, Pakistan
- Batting: Right-handed
- Bowling: Right-arm fast

International information
- National side: Pakistan (1984–1994)
- Test debut (cap 100): 19 March 1984 v England
- Last Test: 01November 1994 v Australia
- ODI debut (cap 54): 02 December 1984 v New Zealand
- Last ODI: 01 January 1989 v West Indies

Head coaching information
- Years: Team
- 2002–2003: Bangladesh

Career statistics
Competition	Test	ODI
Matches	9	19
Runs scored	37	27
Batting average	9.25	9.00
100s/50s	0/0	0/0
Top score	13*	11*
Balls bowled	1,348	881
Wickets	24	21
Bowling average	34.25	36.19
5 wickets in innings	0	0
10 wickets in match	0	0
Best bowling	4/116	4/47
Catches/stumpings	4/–	4/–
- Source: ESPNcricinfo, 4 February 2006

Mohsin Kamal (born 16 June 1963) is a former Pakistani cricketer who played in nine Test matches and 19 One Day Internationals from 1984 to 1994.

Kamal was appointed coach of the Bangladesh national cricket team in 2002. He was sacked in March 2003 shortly before the end of his one-year contract, following the team's poor performance at the 2003 Cricket World Cup in South Africa.
