= Jamie Siddons =

Australian cricketer, born 1964

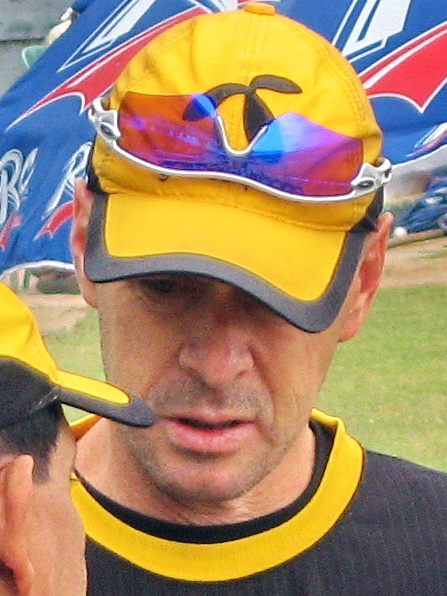

Personal information
- Full name: James Darren Siddons
- Born: 25 April 1964 (age 62); Robinvale, Victoria
- Batting: Right-handed
- Bowling: Legbreak, googly

Domestic team information
- Years: Team
- 1984/85–1990/91: Victoria
- 1991/92–1999/00: South Australia

Head coaching information
- Years: Team
- 2007–2011: Bangladesh
- 2011–2015: Wellington Firebirds
- 2026–Present: Sri Lanka women

Career statistics
Competition	ODI	FC	LA
Matches	1	160	70
Runs scored	32	11,587	1,755
Batting average	32.00	44.91	30.25
100s/50s	0/0	35/53	1/11
Top score	32	245	102
Balls bowled	–	522	–
Wickets	–	2	–
Bowling average	–	173.50	–
5 wickets in innings	–	0	–
10 wickets in match	–	0	–
Best bowling	–	1/8	–
Catches/stumpings	0/–	206/–	33/–
- Source: Cricinfo, 23 December 2011

James Darren Siddons (born 25 April 1964) is an Australian cricketer, renowned for his involvement in Sheffield Shield first-class cricket over a 16-year career. He initially played for Victoria, and later for South Australia. He is currently a professional cricket coach with the Sri Lanka women's national cricket team.

== Playing career ==
On 23 November 1997 he broke David Hookes' Shield run record of 9,364, going on to make 10,643 runs in 146 games. He is now the third highest run-scorer in the Shield's history, behind Darren Lehmann and Jamie Cox. He is considered by some to be one of the finest batsmen in Shield competition not to receive a regular international spot, having been given just one opportunity to represent Australia in a One Day International (ODI), in 1988, scoring 32. Siddons was selected as a reserve for the 1987 Cricket World Cup.

Siddons was a member of Victoria's victorious Sheffield Shield team in 1990/91 and was captain of the South Australian cricket team team that defeated the Western Australia cricket team in the 1995/96 Sheffield Shield final at Adelaide.

== Coaching career ==
On 28 October 2007 Siddons was named the coach of the Bangladesh national cricket team. He left Bangladesh when his contract expired after the end of the 2011 World Cup, in which the team failed to qualify for the quarter-finals. In June 2011, he was appointed as coach of the Wellington Firebirds in New Zealand. In February 2022 he was named as batting coach for the Bangladesh national cricket team appointed by Bangladesh Cricket Board on a primary contract of two years. In March 2026 he took charge of Sri Lanka women's team on a one-year contract.

== AFL Football ==
Siddons grew up in Robinvale, Victoria and played Australian Rules Football with the Robinvale Football Club and won the 1983 Sunraysia Football League best and fairest award, the McLeod Medal. Siddons was then recruited by the Sydney Swans and played two AFL games for the Sydney Swans in 1984.

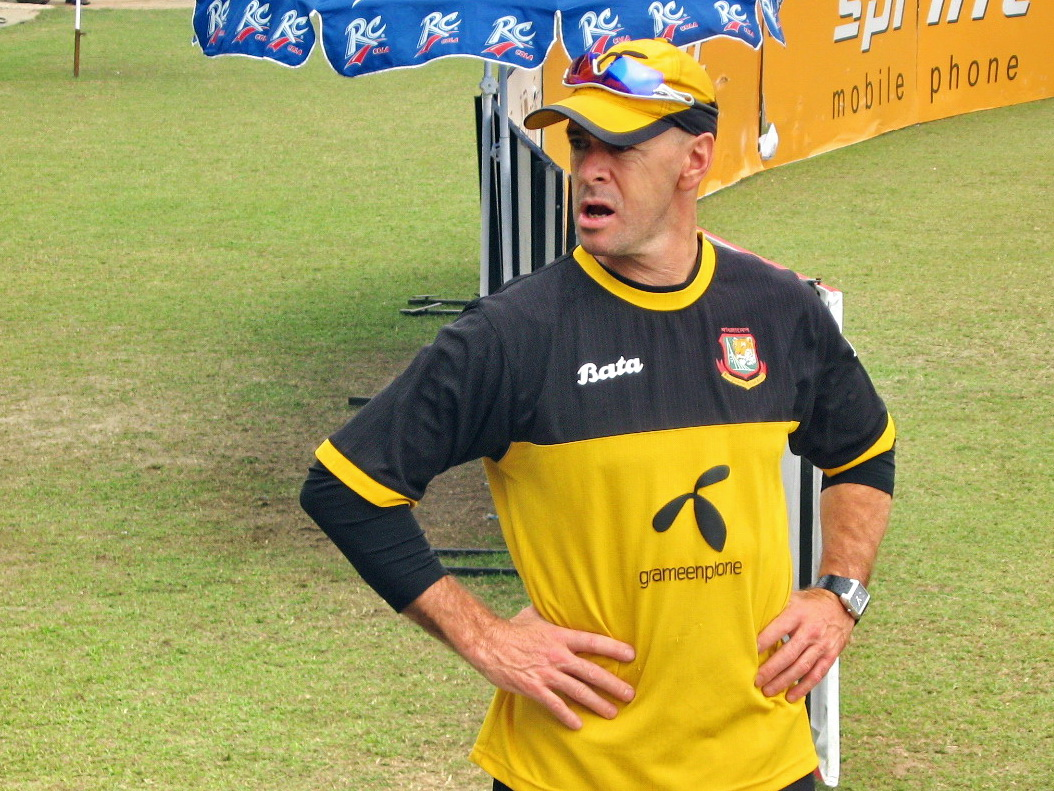
Jamie Siddons, 2009 at Dhaka. SBNS

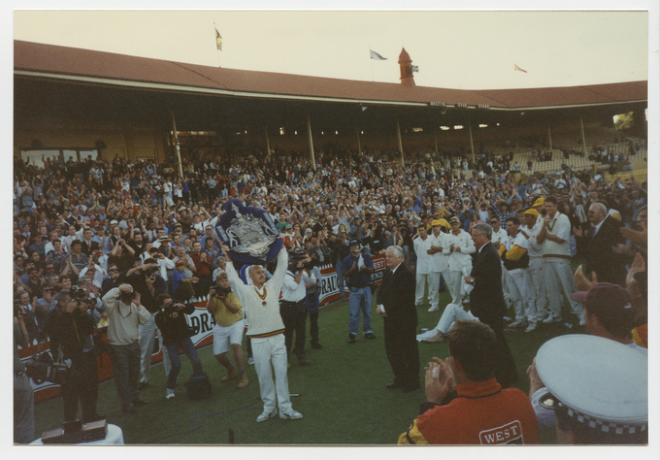
Jamie Siddons, 1996 Sheffield Shield Final
