= A. F. M. Akhtaruddin =

Bangladeshi cricket umpire (born 1968)

Personal information
- Born: 1 January 1968 (age 58); Rajshahi, Bangladesh

Umpiring information
- Tests umpired: 2 (2001–2002)
- ODIs umpired: 16 (2001–2006)
- Source: Cricinfo, 1 July 2013

A. F. M. Akhtaruddin (born 1 January 1968) is a Bangladeshi former cricket umpire. Born in Rajshahi in 1968, he umpired in two Test matches in 2001 and 2002 and in 16 ODI games from 2001 to 2006.

== See also ==
- List of Test cricket umpires
- List of One Day International cricket umpires
