= Bangladeshi cricket team in New Zealand in 1997–98 =

International cricket tour

The Bangladesh national cricket team toured New Zealand in November and December 1997 and played four first-class and four List A matches against teams representing the northern, central and southern regions of New Zealand. Bangladesh also played three List A matches. They lost two by large margins, one was unfinished, and a fourth was abandoned without play. Bangladesh were captained by Akram Khan. Bangladesh had just won the 1997 ICC Trophy and was a candidate for Test status, which was granted on 26 June 2000.

Bangladesh had been playing List A matches since 1986, but the four first-class matches on this tour were the first first-class matches played by any Bangladeshi team.

== Team ==
- Akram Khan (captain)
- Al Sahariar
- Aminul Islam
- Athar Ali Khan
- Habibul Bashar
- Hasanuzzaman
- Hasibul Hossain
- Javed Omar
- Jewel Hossain
- Khaled Mashud
- Mafizur Rahman
- Manjural Islam
- Mehrab Hossain
- Saifullah Khan
- Sanwar Hossain
- Shafiuddin Ahmed

Several leading players were unavailable, including Mohammad Rafique and Khaled Mahmud.

== The tour ==
16 November 1997
Scorecard

Northern Conference	v	Bangladesh

Match abandoned
WestpacTrust Park, Hamilton

- No toss
- No play was possible due to rain.

17–19 November 1997
scorecard

Northern Conference	v	Bangladesh
408 (115.4 overs); Mark Bailey 148; Hasibul Hossain 6/143 (37.4 overs)		125 (51.1 overs); Javed Omar 48; Matthew Hart 4/30 (15.1 overs)
		132 (52.2 overs); Akram Khan 52; Kerry Walmsley 5/23 (14.2)

Northern Conference won by an innings and 151 runs
WestpacTrust Park, Hamilton
Umpires: Billy Bowden (NZ) and Christopher King (NZ)

- Northern Conference won the toss
- Bangladesh made its first-class cricket match debut.
- Phil Chandler took over wicketkeeping duties after Jason Mills was struck while batting on day 2.

All the Bangladesh players made their first-class debuts. In the Bangladesh second innings Kerry Walmsley took 5 for 23 and Mark Haslam took 5 for 25. The match, scheduled for four days, finished on the third afternoon.

23 November 1997
Scorecard

Central Conference; 256/5 (50 overs)	v	Bangladesh; 163/9 (50 overs)
Roger Twose 105*; Hasibul Hossain 3/49 (10 overs)		Hasanuzzaman 46; Roger Twose 4/18

Central Conference won by 93 runs
Basin Reserve, Wellington
Umpires: Evan Watkin (NZ) and Billy Bowden (NZ)
Player of the match: Roger Twose

- Bangladesh won the toss

24–25 November 1997
scorecard

Bangladesh	v	Central Conference
120 (47 overs); Akram Khan 39*; Mark Jefferson 3/5 (4 overs)		311 (91.5 overs); Mathew Sinclair 95; Shafiuddin Ahmed 3/59 (19 overs)
174 (66.2 overs); Sanwar Hossain 44; Mark Jefferson 5/42 (23 overs)

Central won by an innings and 17 runs
Basin Reserve, Wellington
Umpires: Evan Watkin (NZ) and Billy Bowden (NZ)

- Bangladesh won the toss

Mark Jefferson's match figures of 8–47 were his best in first class cricket. No Bangladesh batsman reached 50. The match was over by the end of the second day.

30 November 1997
Scorecard

Bangladesh; 48/3 (14.4 overs)	v	Southern Conference
Habibul Bashar 18; Warren Wisneski 2/19 (6 overs)

Match abandoned
Carisbrook, Dunedin
Umpires: Christopher King (NZ) and Dave Quested (NZ)

- Southern Conference won the toss
- Rain interrupted play at 12:17pm and forced the abandonment of the match

1–4 December 1997
scorecard

Bangladesh	v	Southern Conference
289/9 declared (112 overs); Al Sahariar 102; Paul Wiseman 4/101 (32 overs)		366–6 declared (109.2 overs); Craig Cumming 103; Saifullah Khan 3/91 (27 overs)
244 (102.4 overs); Javed Omar 89; Warren Wisneski 3/52 (11 overs)		165/3 (57.3 overs); Darrin Murray 58; Sanwar Hossain 2/20 (5 overs)

Southern Conference won by 7 wickets
Carisbrook, Dunedin
Umpires: Christopher King (NZ) and Dave Quested (NZ)

- Bangladesh won the toss
- Rain halted play 11 overs early on Day 3

Al Sahariar hit Bangladesh's first first-class century, 102 off 184 balls.

7 December 1997
Scorecard

Canterbury; 266/9 (50 overs)	v	Bangladesh; 154 (42 overs)
Llorne Howell 58; Shafiuddin Ahmed 4/37 (10 overs)		Akram Khan 51*; Michael Owens 3/19 (7 overs)

Canterbury won by 112 runs
Hagley Oval, Christchurch
Umpires: Jeremy Busby (NZ) and Grant Robinson (NZ)

- Bangladesh won the toss

9–11 December 1997
scorecard

Bangladesh	v	New Zealand Academy XI
130 (36 overs); Akram Khan 39; David Sewell 5/34 (14 overs)		448/7 declared (106.5 overs); Michael Parlane 190; Javed Omar 2/75 (19.5 overs)
203 (61.3 overs); Mehrab Hossain 81; Brooke Walker 4/36 (12 overs)

New Zealand Academy XI won by an innings and 115 runs
Lincoln Green, Christchurch
Umpires: Jeremy Busby (NZ) and Dave Quested (NZ)

- Bangladesh won the toss
- Mehrab Hossain retired hurt on 81* Bangladesh's second innings from 136/6 to 164/7 after successive blows to his foot

Chris Gaffaney and Michael Parlane scored centuries for the Academy and put on 213 for the first wicket. David Sewell took 5 for 34 and 4 for 47.

== Assessment ==
The convenor of New Zealand's selection panel, Ross Dykes, thought Bangladesh played at a level below first-class standard – more like Hawke Cup district association standard. Wisden's report said the batsmen "played suicidal one-day shots early in first-class innings", and noted that the bowlers took only 36 wickets in the four first-class matches at a collective average of 47.16.

== Aftermath ==
Seven of the team – Akram Khan, Al Sahariar, Aminul Islam, Habibul Bashar, Hasibul Hossain, Khaled Mashud and Mehrab Hossain – all played in Bangladesh's inaugural Test match three years later. Javed Omar, Manjural Islam and Sanwar Hossain also played Test cricket. For Athar Ali Khan, Jewel Hossain and Mafizur Rahman, in contrast, the matches on this tour comprised their entire first-class careers.

New Zealand had intended to invite Kenya to play in the 1998–99 Shell Conference, but after Bangladesh's lack of competitiveness they changed their minds and invited the stronger Pakistan A instead.
