= Bangladesh at the Cricket World Cup =

Bangladesh cricket team history at ICC Men's World Cup Events

The Bangladesh national cricket team has appeared in each Cricket World Cup since their first appearance at the 1999 Cricket World Cup as an associate team. After that edition, the team gained test status and qualified for the subsequent editions automatically by virtue of having full member status.

Bangladesh's best result in the World Cup came in 2015 when they reached the quarter-final of the tournament. Previously they had reached the Super Eight stage in the 2007 edition. They have a win-loss record of 16-32 from 51 matches at the World Cup.

== Cricket World Cup records ==
Cricket World Cup record									Qualification record				
Year	Round	Position	Pld	W	L	T	NR	Captain	Pld	W	L	T	NR
(England) 1975	Not eligible (Not an ICC member)								No qualifiers held				
(England) 1979	Did not qualify								4	2	2	0	0
(England) (Wales) 1983	Did not qualify								9	4	3	0	2
(India) (Pakistan) 1987	Did not qualify								6	2	4	0	0
(Australia) (New Zealand) 1992	Did not qualify								7	5	2	0	0
(India) (Pakistan) (Sri Lanka) 1996	Did not qualify								7	4	3	0	0
(England) (Republic of Ireland) (Netherlands) (Scotland) (Wales) 1999	Group stage	9/12	5	2	3	0	0	Aminul Islam	10	9	0	0	1
(South Africa) (Kenya) (Zimbabwe) 2003	Group stage	13/14	6	0	5	0	1	Khaled Mashud	Did not enter (qualified directly as full member)				
(Cricket West Indies) 2007	Super Eights	7/16	9	3	6	0	0	Habibul Bashar	Did not enter (qualified directly as full member)				
(Bangladesh) (India) (Sri Lanka) 2011	Group stage	9/14	6	3	3	0	0	Shakib Al Hasan	Did not enter (qualified directly as full member)				
(Australia) (New Zealand) 2015	Quarter-final	7/14	7	3	3	0	1	Mashrafe Mortaza	Did not enter (qualified directly as full member)				
(England) (Wales) 2019	League Stage	8/10	9	3	5	0	1	Mashrafe Mortaza	Qualified via ODI rankings (7th place)				
(India) 2023	League Stage	8/10	9	2	7	0	0	Najmul Hossain Shanto	24	15	8	0	1
Total	0 Titles	7/13	51	16	32	0	3	—N/a	67	41	22	0	4

=== Record by opponents ===
Records versus other teams
Opponent	M	W	L	T	NR	Win %	First win
Afghanistan	3	3	0	0	0	100.00	18 February 2015
Australia	4	0	4	0	0	0.00	
Bermuda	1	1	0	0	0	100.00	25 March 2007
Canada	1	0	1	0	0	0.00	
England	5	2	3	0	0	40.00	11 March 2011
India	5	1	4	0	0	20.00	17 March 2007
Ireland	2	1	1	0	0	50.00	25 February 2011
Kenya	1	0	1	0	0	0.00	
Netherlands	2	1	1	0	0	50.00	14 March 2011
New Zealand	6	0	6	0	0	0.00	
Pakistan	3	1	2	0	0	33.33	31 May 1999
Scotland	2	2	0	0	0	100.00	24 May 1999
South Africa	5	2	3	0	0	40.00	7 April 2007
Sri Lanka	5	1	3	0	1	20.00	6 November 2023
West Indies	5	1	3	0	1	20.00	17 June 2019
Total	51	16	32	0	3	32.65%	—N/a
Source: Last Updated: 11 November 2023

== Tournament history ==
=== 1999 Cricket World Cup ===
Bangladesh for the first time participated in the Cricket World Cup in this edition as an associate member and was placed in Group B. Bangladesh played their first-ever World Cup match against New Zealand at County Ground in Chelmsford, and they eventually lost the match by 6 wickets, being bundled out for a mere 116 runs in the first innings. They also lost their second group match against West Indies by 7 wickets. However, Bangladesh tasted their first World Cup victory against another associate nation, Scotland, in their third group match, courtesy of Minhajul Abedin's well-made 68* where they defeated Scotland by 22 runs.

However, Bangladesh returned to losing again in their next match against Australia, where Australia beat them by 7 wickets. But in their very next match, they stunned the cricket world by defeating Pakistan, the champion of the 1992 Cricket World Cup. This win also helped them acquire Test status in the very next year.

After the group stage Bangladesh finished in fifth position with 2 wins and 3 losses. Though Bangladesh could not make their way to the Super Six stage, they returned home with some moderate performances.

Squad

- Aminul Islam Bulbul (c)
- Akram Khan
- Khaled Mashud (wk)
- Khaled Mahmud
- Mohammad Rafique
- Naimur Rahman
- Enamul Haque
- Hasibul Hossain
- Shahriar Hossain
- Mehrab Hossain
- Manjural Islam
- Faruk Ahmed
- Niamur Rashid
- Minhajul Abedin
- Shafiuddin Ahmed

Results

Pool stage (Pool B)						Super Six		Semifinal	Final	Overall Result
Opposition Result	Opposition Result	Opposition Result	Opposition Result	Opposition Result	Rank	Opposition Result	Rank	Opposition Result	Opposition Result	Overall Result
New Zealand; L by 6 wickets	West Indies; L by 7 wickets	Scotland; W by 22 runs	Australia; L by 7 wickets	Pakistan; W by 62 runs	5	Did not advance				Pool stage
Source: ESPNcricinfo

Scorecards

Pool stage (Pool B)

17 May 1999
Scorecard

Bangladesh; 116 (37.4 overs)	v	New Zealand; 117/4 (33 overs)
Enamul Haque 19 (41); Chris Cairns 3/19 (7 overs)		Matt Horne 35 (86); Naimur Rahman 1/5 (2 overs)

New Zealand won by 6 wickets
County Ground, Chelmsford
Umpires: Ian Robinson (Zim) and Srinivasaraghavan Venkataraghavan (Ind)
Player of the match: Gavin Larsen (NZ)

- New Zealand won the toss and elected to field.

21 May 1999
Scorecard

Bangladesh; 182 (49.2 overs)	v	West Indies; 183/3 (46.3 overs)
Mehrab Hossain 64 (129); Courtney Walsh 4/25 (10 overs)		Jimmy Adams 53* (82); Minhajul Abedin 1/28 (7 overs)

West Indies won by 7 wickets
Clontarf Cricket Club Ground, Dublin
Umpires: KT Francis (SL) and Darrell Hair (Aus)
Player of the match: Courtney Walsh (WI)

- Bangladesh won the toss and elected to bat.

24 May 1999
Scorecard

Bangladesh; 185/9 (50 overs)	v	Scotland; 163 (46.2 overs)
Minhajul Abedin 68* (116); John Blain 4/37 (10 overs)		Gavin Hamilton 63 (71); Hasibul Hossain 2/26 (8 overs)

Bangladesh won by 22 runs
Grange Cricket Club Ground, Edinburgh
Umpires: K. T. Francis (SL) and Dave Orchard (SA)
Player of the match: Minhajul Abedin (Ban)

- Scotland won the toss and elected to field.

27 May 1999
Scorecard

Bangladesh; 178/7 (50 overs)	v	Australia; 181/3 (19.5 overs)
Minhajul Abedin 53* (99); Tom Moody 3/25 (10 overs)		Adam Gilchrist 63 (39); Enamul Haque 2/40 (5 overs)

Australia won by 7 wickets
Riverside Ground, Chester-le-Street
Umpires: Steve Bucknor (WI) and Dave Orchard (SA)
Player of the match: Tom Moody (Aus)

- Australia won the toss and elected to field.

31 May 1999
Scorecard

Bangladesh; 223/9 (50 overs)	v	Pakistan; 161 (44.3 overs)
Akram Khan 42 (66); Saqlain Mushtaq 5/35 (10 overs)		Wasim Akram 29 (52); Khaled Mahmud 3/31 (10 overs)

Bangladesh won by 62 runs
County Ground, Northampton
Umpires: Doug Cowie (NZ) and Darrell Hair (Aus)
Player of the match: Khaled Mahmud (Ban)

- Pakistan won the toss and elected to field.

=== 2003 Cricket World Cup ===
After their moderate performance in their first appearance in World Cup and acquiring Test status in 2000, Bangladesh would have expected a better World Cup performance this year but they had a nightmare performance in this tournament losing 5 out of their group matches while one was washed out and were placed last in their group.

Bangladesh were placed in Group B with Sri Lanka, Kenya, New Zealand, South Africa, West Indies and Canada. In their first group match Bangladesh was upset by Canada, first time featuring in the World Cup. Although Canada could only manage 180 after losing all their wickets, Bangladesh performed even worse, being bundled out for just 120 and lost the match by 60 runs. In their third match West Indies managed 244 batting first, in the second inning Bangladesh could bat only 8 overs and match washed away due to heavy rain. In none of their group matches Bangladesh could breach the line of 200-run marks while the match against Caribbeans washed away. Their highest team total in the tournament was against New Zealand where they posted 198 losing 7 wickets but the latter successfully chased that down with 7 wickets in hand. In their last group match they could not even chase 217 runs posted by Kenya and were folded in just 185 runs resulting in their 32-runs defeat and consequently Kenya progressed to the Super Six stage.

Squad

- Khaled Mashud (c) (wk)
- Akram Khan
- Al Sahariar
- Habibul Bashar
- Hannan Sarkar
- Mohammad Ashraful
- Ehsanul Haque
- Tushar Imran
- Alok Kapali
- Manjural Islam
- Tapash Baisya
- Talha Jubair
- Khaled Mahmud
- Sanwar Hossain
- Mohammad Rafique

Results

Pool stage (Pool B)							Super Sixes		Semifinal	Final	Overall Result
Opposition Result	Opposition Result	Opposition Result	Opposition Result	Opposition Result	Opposition Result	Rank	Opposition Result	Rank	Opposition Result	Opposition Result	Overall Result
Canada; L by 60 runs	Sri Lanka; L by 10 wickets	West Indies; No result	South Africa; L by 10 wickets	New Zealand; L by 7 wickets	Kenya; L by 32 runs	7	Did not advance				Pool stage
Source: ESPNcricinfo

Scorecards

Pool stage (Pool B)

11 February 2003 (D/N)
Scorecard

Canada; 180 (49.1 overs)	v	Bangladesh; 120 (28 overs)
Ian Billcliff 42 (63); Sanwar Hossain 2/26 (10 overs)		Sanwar Hossain 25 (24); Austin Codrington 5/27 (9 overs)

Canada won by 60 runs
Kingsmead Cricket Ground, Durban
Umpires: Aleem Dar (Pak) and Brian Jerling (SA)
Player of the match: Austin Codrington (Can)

- Canada won the toss and elected to bat.
- Points: Canada 4, Bangladesh 0

14 February 2003
Scorecard

Bangladesh; 124 (31.1 overs)	v	Sri Lanka; 126/0 (21.1 overs)
Alok Kapali 32 (38); Chaminda Vaas 6/25 (9.1 overs)		Marvan Atapattu 69* (71)

Sri Lanka won by 10 wickets
City Oval, Pietermaritzburg
Umpires: Billy Bowden (NZ) and Russell Tiffin (Zim)
Player of the match: Chaminda Vaas (SL)

- Sri Lanka won the toss and elected to field.
- Points: Sri Lanka 4, Bangladesh 0

18 February 2003
Scorecard

West Indies; 244/9 (50 overs)	v	Bangladesh; 32/2 (8.1 overs)
Ricardo Powell 50 (31); Manjurul Islam 2/37 (10 overs)		Ehsanul Haque 12 (24); Mervyn Dillon 1/13 (4.1 overs)

No result
Willowmoore Park, Benoni
Umpires: Brian Jerling (SA) and Russell Tiffin (Zim)

- Bangladesh won the toss and elected to field.
- Rain interrupted during the innings of West Indies and the match was eventually called off
- Points: West Indies 2, Bangladesh 2

22 February 2003
Scorecard

Bangladesh; 108 (35.1 overs)	v	South Africa; 109/0 (12 overs)
Khaled Mashud 29 (67); Makhaya Ntini 4/24 (7.1 overs)		Gary Kirsten 52* (32)

South Africa won by 10 wickets
Goodyear Park, Bloemfontein
Umpires: Billy Bowden (NZ) and S Venkataraghavan (Ind)
Player of the match: Makhaya Ntini (SA)

- South Africa won the toss and elected to field.
- Points: South Africa 4, Bangladesh 0

26 February 2003
Scorecard

Bangladesh; 198/7 (50 overs)	v	New Zealand; 199/3 (33.3 overs)
Mohammad Ashraful 56 (82); Jacob Oram 3/32 (10 overs)		Craig McMillan 75 (83); Khaled Mahmud 3/46 (10 overs)

New Zealand won by 7 wickets
De Beers Diamond Oval, Kimberley
Umpires: Darrell Hair (Aus) and David Shepherd (Eng)
Player of the match: Craig McMillan (NZ)

- Bangladesh won the toss elected to bat.
- Points: New Zealand 4, Bangladesh 0

1 March 2003
Scorecard

Kenya; 217/7 (50 overs)	v	Bangladesh; 185 (47.2 overs)
Maurice Odumbe 52* (46); Sanwar Hossain 3/49 (10 overs)		Tushar Imran 48 (81); Maurice Odumbe 4/38 (10 overs)

Kenya won by 32 runs
New Wanderers Stadium, Johannesburg
Umpires: Asoka de Silva (SL) and Neil Mallender (Eng)
Player of the match: Maurice Odumbe (Ken)

- Kenya won the toss and elected to bat.
- Points: Kenya 4, Bangladesh 0

=== 2007 Cricket World Cup ===
16 teams (including 6 associates) participated in 2007 World Cup. Bangladesh were placed into Group B along with India, Sri Lanka and the first and only time participant Bermuda.

In their first group match, Bangladesh stunned the cricket world by defeating India by 5 wickets with the great bowling of Mashrafe Mortaza, Mohammad Rafique and Abdur Razzak and India were all out for just 191 runs. In reply Bangladesh reached the target with 9 balls to spare courtesy of the fifties of three youngsters Shakib Al Hasan, Mushfiqur Rahim and Tamim Iqbal.

In their next group match Bangladesh lost to Sri Lanka by 198 runs. In their third and last match of group stage Bangladesh sealed their spot in Super Eights defeating Bermuda by 7 wickets and consequently India had to exit the tournament from group stage.

In a Super Eight stage game, Bangladesh again caused an upset, defeating South Africa by 67 runs in their only victory out of their 7 Super Eight matches.

Squad

- Habibul Bashar (c)
- Shahriar Nafees
- Tamim Iqbal
- Javed Omar
- Rajin Saleh
- Aftab Ahmed
- Mohammad Ashraful
- Shakib Al Hasan
- Mashrafe Mortaza
- Tapash Baisya
- Syed Rasel
- Abdur Razzak
- Mohammad Rafique
- Mushfiqur Rahim (wk)
- Farhad Reza
- Shahadat Hossain

Results

Group stage (Group B)				Super Eight							Semifinal	Final	Overall Result
Opposition Result	Opposition Result	Opposition Result	Rank	Opposition Result	Opposition Result	Opposition Result	Opposition Result	Opposition Result	Opposition Result	Rank	Opposition Result	Opposition Result	Overall Result
India; W by 5 wickets	Sri Lanka; L by 198 runs (D/L)	Bermuda; W by 7 wickets (D/L)	2	Australia; L by 10 wickets	New Zealand; L by 9 wickets	South Africa; W by 67 runs	England; L by 4 wickets	Ireland; L by 74 runs	West Indies; L by 99 runs	7	Did not advance		Super Eight
Source: ESPNcricinfo

Scorecards

Group stage (Group B)

17 March 2007
09:30
Scorecard

India; 191 (49.3 overs)	v	Bangladesh; 192/5 (48.3 overs)
Sourav Ganguly 66 (129); Mashrafe Mortaza 4/38 (9.3 overs)		Mushfiqur Rahim 56* (107); Munaf Patel 2/38 (8.3 overs)

Bangladesh won by 5 wickets
Queen's Park Oval, Port of Spain
Umpires: Aleem Dar (Pak) and Steve Davis (Aus)
Player of the match: Mashrafe Mortaza (Ban)

- India won the toss and elected to bat.

21 March 2007
scorecard

Sri Lanka; 318/4 (50 overs)	v	Bangladesh; 112 (37 overs)
Sanath Jayasuriya 109 (87); Mohammad Rafique 1/48 (10 overs)		Mohammad Ashraful 45* (63); Lasith Malinga 3/27 (6 overs)

Sri Lanka won by 198 runs (D/L method)
Queen's Park Oval, Port of Spain
Umpires: Steve Davis (Aus) and Daryl Harper (Aus)
Player of the match: Sanath Jayasuriya (SL)

- Sri Lanka won the toss and elected to bat.

25 March 2007
scorecard

Bermuda; 94/9 (21 overs)	v	Bangladesh; 96/3 (17.3 overs)
Dean Minors 23 (25); Abdur Razzak 3/20 (4 overs)		Mohammad Ashraful 29* (32); Saleem Mukuddem 3/19 (5 overs)

Bangladesh won by 7 wickets (DLS method)
Queen's Park Oval, Port of Spain
Umpires: Steve Davis (Aus) and Ian Howell (SA)
Player of the match: Mohammad Ashraful (Ban)

- Bangladesh won the toss and elected to field.
- Match reduced to 21 Over due to rain

Super Eight stage

31 March 2007
Scorecard

Bangladesh; 104/6 (22 overs)	v	Australia; 106/0 (13.5 overs)
Mashrafe Mortaza 25* (17); Glenn McGrath 3/16 (5 overs)		Adam Gilchrist 59* (44)

Australia won by 10 wickets
Sir Vivian Richards Stadium, North Sound
Umpires: Aleem Dar (Pak) and Billy Bowden (NZ)
Player of the match: Glenn McGrath (Aus)

- Australia won the toss and elected to field.
- The match was shortened to 22 overs a side due to a wet outfield.

2 April 2007
Scorecard

Bangladesh; 174 (48.3 overs)	v	New Zealand; 178/1 (29.2 overs)
Mohammad Rafique 30* (36); Scott Styris 4/43 (10 overs)		Stephen Fleming 102 (92); Syed Rasel 1/22 (7 overs)

New Zealand won by 9 wickets
Sir Vivian Richards Stadium, North Sound
Umpires: Aleem Dar (Pak) and Rudi Koertzen (SA)
Player of the match: Shane Bond (NZ)

- New Zealand won the toss and elected to field.

7 April 2007
9:30
Scorecard

Bangladesh; 251/8 (50 overs)	v	South Africa; 184 (48.4 overs)
Mohammad Ashraful 87 (83); André Nel 5/45 (10 overs)		Herschelle Gibbs 56* (59); Abdur Razzak 3/25 (9.4 overs)

Bangladesh won by 67 runs
Providence Stadium, Guyana
Umpires: Mark Benson (Eng) and Billy Doctrove (WI)
Player of the match: Mohammad Ashraful (Ban)

- South Africa won the toss and elected to field.

11 April 2007
Scorecard

Bangladesh; 143 (37.2 overs)	v	England; 147/6 (44.5 overs)
Shakib Al Hasan 57* (95); Monty Panesar 3/25 (7 overs)		Michael Vaughan 30 (59); Syed Rasel 2/25 (10 overs)

England won by 4 wickets
Kensington Oval, Bridgetown
Umpires: Steve Bucknor (WI) and Simon Taufel (Aus)
Player of the match: Sajid Mahmood (Eng)

- England won the toss and elected to field.

15 April 2007
Scorecard

Ireland; 243/7 (50 overs)	v	Bangladesh; 169 (41.2 overs)
William Porterfield 85 (136); Mashrafe Mortaza 2/38 (10 overs)		Mohammad Ashraful 35 (36); Kyle McCallan 2/25 (8 overs)

Ireland won by 74 runs
Kensington Oval, Bridgetown
Umpires: Billy Bowden (NZ) and Steve Bucknor (WI)
Player of the match: William Porterfield (Ire)

- Ireland won the toss and elected to bat.

19 April 2007
Scorecard

West Indies; 230/5 (50 overs)	v	Bangladesh; 131 (43.5 overs)
Ramnaresh Sarwan 91* (90); Mashrafe Mortaza 1/39 (10 overs)		Mushfiqur Rahim 38* (75); Daren Powell 3/38 (10 overs)

West Indies won by 99 runs
Kensington Oval, Bridgetown
Umpires: Billy Bowden (NZ) and Rudi Koertzen (SA)
Player of the match: Ramnaresh Sarwan (WI)

- Bangladesh won the toss and elected to field.

=== 2011 Cricket World Cup ===
Despite being the co-hosts and having advantage of playing at home and also having an experienced squad, they failed to come up to the expectations. The World Cup opened with a match between co-hosts Bangladesh and India. While India batting first posted a huge total of 370 for 4. In reply, Bangladesh started off rapidly in their chase, getting 51 runs in the first five overs; but they were unable to build on the momentum, as they ended up getting 283/9 without challenging the Indian total.

In their next match against Ireland, Bangladesh were all out for only 205, but in reply Ireland were folded out for 178 runs. In their third group match, Bangladesh were bowled out for 58 runs, which was their lowest ODI score, and the fourth lowest score in World Cup matches. In reply, the West Indies reached the target losing one wicket with 226 balls to spare.

In the next match England could only manage 225 runs before being bowled out, Bangladesh's score, in reply, was at one point 169/8 but Mahmudullah with the tail ender Shafiul Islam made unbeaten 58 run partnership for the 8th wicket that brought victory for the team. This win also accounted as One of their Greatest Victories of World Cup history They continued the win streak as they defeated the Netherlands. However, their run ended as they faced defeat against South Africa in their last group match in which they were bowled out for a total of just 78.

Squad

- Shakib Al Hasan (c)
- Tamim Iqbal (vc)
- Imrul Kayes
- Junaid Siddique
- Shahriar Nafees
- Raqibul Hasan
- Mohammad Ashraful
- Mushfiqur Rahim (wk)
- Mahmudullah
- Naeem Islam
- Abdur Razzak
- Suhrawadi Shuvo
- Rubel Hossain
- Shafiul Islam
- Nazmul Hossain

Results

Group stage (Group B)							Quarterfinal	Semifinal	Final	Overall Result
Opposition Result	Opposition Result	Opposition Result	Opposition Result	Opposition Result	Opposition Result	Rank	Opposition Result	Opposition Result	Opposition Result	Overall Result
India; L by 87 runs	Ireland; W by 27 runs	West Indies; L by 9 wickets	England; W by 2 wickets	Netherlands; W by 6 wickets	South Africa; L by 206 runs	5	Did not advance			Group stage
Source: ESPNcricinfo

Scorecards

Group stage (Group B)

19 February 2011
14:30 (D/N)
Scorecard

India; 370/4 (50 overs)	v	Bangladesh; 283/9 (50 overs)
Virender Sehwag 175 (140); Mahmudullah 1/49 (7 overs)		Tamim Iqbal 70 (86); Munaf Patel 4/48 (10 overs)

India won by 87 runs
Sher-e-Bangla National Cricket Stadium, Dhaka
Umpires: Steve Davis (Aus) and Kumar Dharmasena (SL)
Player of the match: Virender Sehwag (Ind)

- Bangladesh won the toss and elected to field.

25 February 2011
14:30 (D/N)
Scorecard

Bangladesh; 205 (49.2 overs)	v	Ireland; 178 (45 overs)
Tamim Iqbal 44 (43); Andre Botha 3/32 (9 overs)		Niall O'Brien 38 (52); Shafiul Islam 4/21 (8 overs)

Bangladesh won by 27 runs
Sher-e-Bangla National Cricket Stadium, Dhaka
Umpires: Aleem Dar (Pak) and Rod Tucker (Aus)
Player of the match: Tamim Iqbal (Ban)

- Bangladesh won the toss and elected to bat.

4 March 2011
14:30 (D/N)
Scorecard

Bangladesh; 58 (18.5 overs)	v	West Indies; 59/1 (12.2 overs)
Junaid Siddique 25 (27); Sulieman Benn 4/18 (5.5 overs)		Chris Gayle 37* (36); Naeem Islam 1/14 (6 overs)

West Indies won by 9 wickets
Sher-e-Bangla National Cricket Stadium, Dhaka
Umpires: Steve Davis (Aus) and Kumar Dharmasena (SL)
Player of the match: Kemar Roach (WI)

- Bangladesh won the toss and elected to bat.

11 March 2011
14:30 (D/N)
Scorecard

England; 225 (49.4 overs)	v	Bangladesh; 227/8 (49 overs)
Jonathan Trott 67 (99); Naeem Islam 2/29 (8 overs)		Imrul Kayes 60 (100); Ajmal Shahzad 3/43 (10 overs)

Bangladesh won by 2 wickets
Zohur Ahmed Chowdhury Stadium, Chittagong
Umpires: Daryl Harper (Aus) and Rod Tucker (Aus)
Player of the match: Imrul Kayes (Ban)

- Bangladesh won the toss and elected to field.

14 March 2011
09:30
Scorecard

Netherlands; 160 (46.2 overs)	v	Bangladesh; 166/4 (41.2 overs)
Ryan ten Doeschate 53* (71); Abdur Razzak 3/29 (10 overs)		Imrul Kayes 73* (113); Tom Cooper 2/33 (7.2 overs)

Bangladesh won by 6 wickets
Zohur Ahmed Chowdhury Stadium, Chittagong
Umpires: Aleem Dar (Pak) and Rod Tucker (Aus)
Player of the match: Imrul Kayes (Ban)

- Netherlands won the toss and elected to bat.

19 March 2011
09:30
Scorecard

South Africa; 284/8 (50 overs)	v	Bangladesh; 78 (28 overs)
Jacques Kallis 69 (76); Rubel Hossain 3/56 (8 overs)		Shakib Al Hasan 30 (49); Robin Peterson 4/12 (7 overs)

South Africa won by 206 runs
Sher-e-Bangla National Cricket Stadium, Dhaka
Umpires: Aleem Dar (Pak) and Daryl Harper (Aus)
Player of the match: Lonwabo Tsotsobe (SA)

- South Africa won the toss and elected to bat.

=== 2015 Cricket World Cup ===
Bangladesh entered the 2015 Cricket World Cup in Australasia with a balanced squad of experienced players. They were placed in Pool A alongside hosts Australia and New Zealand, as well as England, Sri Lanka, Afghanistan and Scotland. Bangladesh began with a 105‑run win over Afghanistan, where Shakib Al Hasan crossed 4000 ODI runs. Their fixture against Australia was washed out, while Sri Lanka handed them a heavy defeat. In the next match, Bangladesh scripted history by chasing 319 against Scotland — their highest ODI run‑chase and the second‑highest in World Cup history.

The decisive group match came against England, where Mahmudullah scored Bangladesh's first World Cup century and shared a record partnership with Mushfiqur Rahim. A late burst from Rubel Hossain sealed a famous 15‑run victory, sending Bangladesh into the quarter‑finals for the first time.

Bangladesh faced India in their first-ever World Cup knockout match. Batting first, India posted 302/6 in 50 overs, led by Rohit Sharma's 137 and Suresh Raina's half-century. In reply, Bangladesh's batsmen failed to convert their starts into big scores and were bowled out for 193 in 45 overs, losing by 109 runs.

Squad

- Mashrafe Mortaza (c)
- Shakib Al Hasan (vc)
- Tamim Iqbal
- Shafiul Islam (wk)
- Mushfiqur Rahim (wk)
- Mahmudullah
- Soumya Sarkar
- Sabbir Rahman
- Nasir Hossain
- Taskin Ahmed
- Rubel Hossain
- Imrul Kayes
- Taijul Islam
- Arafat Sunny
- Mominul Haque

Results

Pool stage (Pool A)							Quarterfinal	Semifinal	Final	Overall Result
Opposition Result	Opposition Result	Opposition Result	Opposition Result	Opposition Result	Opposition Result	Rank	Opposition Result	Opposition Result	Opposition Result	Overall Result
Afghanistan; W by 105 runs	Australia; Match abandoned	Sri Lanka; L by 92 runs	Scotland; W by 6 wickets	England; W by 15 runs	New Zealand; L by 3 wickets	4	India; L by 109 runs	Did not advance		Quarterfinals
Source: ESPNcricinfo

Scorecards

Pool stage (Pool A)

18 February
14:30 (AEDT) (D/N)
Scorecard

Bangladesh; 267 (50 overs)	v	Afghanistan; 162 (42.5 overs)
Mushfiqur Rahim 71 (56); Shapoor Zadran 2/20 (7 overs)		Mohammad Nabi 44 (43); Mashrafe Mortaza 3/20 (9 overs)

Bangladesh won by 105 runs
Manuka Oval, Canberra
Attendance: 10,972
Umpires: Steve Davis (Aus) and Joel Wilson (WI)
Player of the match: Mushfiqur Rahim (Ban)

- Bangladesh won the toss and elected to bat.
- Shakib Al Hasan became the first Bangladeshi cricketer to reach 4,000 ODI runs.

21 February
13:30 (AEST) (D/N)
Scorecard

Australia	v	Bangladesh

Match abandoned without a ball being bowled
The Gabba, Brisbane
Umpires: Kumar Dharmasena (SL) and Billy Bowden (NZ)

- No toss.
- Match called off at 16:42 due to heavy rain.
- This was only the second ever World Cup match abandoned without a ball being bowled.

26 February
14:30 (AEDT) (D/N)
Scorecard

Sri Lanka; 332/1 (50 overs)	v	Bangladesh; 240 (47 overs)
Tillakaratne Dilshan 161* (146); Rubel Hossain 1/62 (9 overs)		Sabbir Rahman 53 (62); Lasith Malinga 3/35 (9 overs)

Sri Lanka won by 92 runs
MCG, Melbourne
Attendance: 30,012
Umpires: Aleem Dar (Pak) and Paul Reiffel (Aus)
Player of the match: Tillakaratne Dilshan (SL)

- Sri Lanka won the toss and elected to bat.
- Tillakaratne Dilshan and Kumar Sangakkara's unbroken partnership of 210 was Sri Lanka's highest second-wicket partnership in ODIs.
- Kumar Sangakkara became the fourth cricketer to play 400 ODI matches.
- Dilshan's score of 161 not out was the highest individual score in an ODI without hitting a six.

5 March
11:00 (NZDT)
Scorecard

Scotland; 318/8 (50 overs)	v	Bangladesh; 322/4 (48.1 overs)
Kyle Coetzer 156 (134); Taskin Ahmed 3/43 (7 overs)		Tamim Iqbal 95 (100); Josh Davey 2/68 (10 overs)

Bangladesh won by 6 wickets
Saxton Oval, Nelson
Attendance: 3,491
Umpires: Simon Fry (Aus) and Bruce Oxenford (Aus)
Player of the match: Kyle Coetzer (Sco)

- Bangladesh won the toss and elected to field.
- This was the first time Scotland scored more than 300 in a World Cup match, and the first time ever that Scotland scored more than 300 against a Test-playing nation.
- Kyle Coetzer scored Scotland's maiden World Cup century and the highest score by an associate nation player in World Cups.
- This is Bangladesh's highest ODI run-chase and second highest run-chase in World Cup history.
- Scotland was eliminated from the World Cup as a result of this match.

9 March
14:00 (ACDT) (D/N)
Scorecard

Bangladesh; 275/7 (50 overs)	v	England; 260 (48.3 overs)
Mahmudullah Riyad 103 (138); James Anderson 2/45 (10 overs)		Jos Buttler 65 (52); Rubel Hossain 4/53 (9.3 overs)

Bangladesh won by 15 runs
Adelaide Oval, Adelaide
Attendance: 11,963
Umpires: Billy Bowden (NZ) and Paul Reiffel (Aus)
Player of the match: Mahmudullah Riyad (Ban)

- England won the toss and elected to field.
- Mahmudullah Riyad became the first player to score a century for Bangladesh in a World Cup match.
- Mahmudullah Riyad and Mushfiqur Rahim's partnership of 141 was the highest partnership for any wicket for Bangladesh in a World Cup match. It was also Bangladesh's highest ODI partnership against England.
- This was also Bangladesh's highest score in an ODI against England.
- Bangladesh and Sri Lanka qualified for the quarter-finals as a result of this match. This was only the second time that Bangladesh had progressed past the group stage of a World Cup and their first appearance in the knockout stage.
- England was eliminated from the World Cup as a result of this match.
- Bangladesh captain Mashrafe Mortaza was fined 40% of his match fee for a slow over rate. The other Bangladesh players were fined 20% of their match fee.

13 March
14:00 (NZDT) (D/N)
Scorecard

Bangladesh; 288/7 (50 overs)	v	New Zealand; 290/7 (48.5 overs)
Mahmudullah Riyad 128* (123); Corey Anderson 2/43 (10 overs)		Martin Guptill 105 (100); Shakib Al Hasan 4/55 (8.5 overs)

New Zealand won by 3 wickets
Seddon Park, Hamilton
Attendance: 10,347
Umpires: Kumar Dharmasena (SL) and Richard Kettleborough (Eng)
Player of the match: Martin Guptill (NZ)

- New Zealand won the toss and elected to field.
- Mahmudullah Riyad became the first Bangladesh player to score two consecutive World Cup centuries.
- Ross Taylor became the fourth New Zealand player to score 5,000 runs in ODI matches.

Knockout stage

Quarter-final 2

19 March
14:30 (AEDT) (D/N)
Scorecard

India; 302/6 (50 overs)	v	Bangladesh; 193 (45 overs)
Rohit Sharma 137 (126); Taskin Ahmed 3/69 (10 overs)		Nasir Hossain 35 (34); Umesh Yadav 4/31 (9 overs)

India won by 109 runs
Melbourne Cricket Ground, Melbourne
Umpires: Aleem Dar (Pak) and Ian Gould (Eng)
Player of the match: Rohit Sharma (Ind)

- India won the toss and elected to bat.
- This was MS Dhoni's 100th ODI win as India captain.
- This was a record seventh consecutive match in which India bowled the opposition out.
- The umpires received widespread criticism after some controversial decision-making. International Cricket Council President Mustafa Kamal said that Bangladesh would appeal against the decisions of the umpires in ICC's board meeting.
- Mashrafe Mortaza (Ban) was suspended for one ODI, and fined 40% of his match fee for a slow over rate; the other Bangladesh players were fined 20% of their match fee.

=== 2019 Cricket World Cup ===
Bangladesh qualified for the World Cup directly after finishing seventh in the ICC ODI rankings on 30 September 2017. Bangladesh announced their 15-man squad on 16 April.

Bangladesh started off their World Cup campaign on a high note defeating South Africa by 21 runs, thus becoming the first Asian team to defeat South Africa twice in World Cup. But they managed to secure just two more wins in the next eight matches against West Indies and Afghanistan, finishing 8th in the league stage.

Squad

- Mashrafe Mortaza (c)
- Tamim Iqbal
- Soumya Sarkar
- Liton Das (wk)
- Shakib Al Hasan
- Mushfiqur Rahim (wk)
- Mahmudullah
- Sabbir Rahman
- Mohammad Mithun
- Mosaddek Hossain
- Mehidy Hasan
- Mohammad Saifuddin
- Rubel Hossain
- Mustafizur Rahman
- Abu Jayed

Results

League stage										Semifinal	Final	Overall Result
Opposition Result	Opposition Result	Opposition Result	Opposition Result	Opposition Result	Opposition Result	Opposition Result	Opposition Result	Opposition Result	Rank	Opposition Result	Opposition Result	Overall Result
South Africa; W by 21 runs	New Zealand; L 2 wickets	England; L by 106 runs	Sri Lanka; Match abandoned	West Indies; W by 7 wickets	Australia; L by 48 runs	Afghanistan; W by 62 runs	India; L by 28 runs	Pakistan; L by 94 runs	8	Did not advance		League stage
Source: ESPNcricinfo

Scorecards

League stage

2 June 2019
10:30
Scorecard

Bangladesh; 330/6 (50 overs)	v	South Africa; 309/8 (50 overs)
Mushfiqur Rahim 78 (80); Andile Phehlukwayo 2/52 (10 overs)		Faf du Plessis 62 (53); Mustafizur Rahman 3/67 (10 overs)

Bangladesh won by 21 runs
The Oval, London
Umpires: Paul Reiffel (Aus) and Joel Wilson (WI)
Player of the match: Shakib Al Hasan (Ban)

- South Africa won the toss and elected to field.
- Imran Tahir (SA) played in his 100th ODI.
- Shakib Al Hasan and Mushfiqur Rahim scored 142 runs for the third wicket, the highest partnership for any wicket for Bangladesh in a World Cup.
- Bangladesh scored their highest total in ODIs.
- Shakib Al Hasan (Ban) became the fastest cricketer to take 250 wickets and score 5,000 runs in ODIs, in terms of number of matches (199).

5 June 2019
13:30 (D/N)
Scorecard

Bangladesh; 244 (49.2 overs)	v	New Zealand; 248/8 (47.1 overs)
Shakib Al Hasan 64 (68); Matt Henry 4/47 (9.2 overs)		Ross Taylor 82 (91); Mosaddek Hossain 2/33 (8 overs)

New Zealand won by 2 wickets
The Oval, London
Umpires: Bruce Oxenford (Aus) and Paul Reiffel (Aus)
Player of the match: Ross Taylor (NZ)

- New Zealand won the toss and elected to field.
- Shakib Al Hasan (Ban) played in his 200th ODI.
- Mushfiqur Rahim played in his 350th international match for Bangladesh.
- Ross Taylor played in his 400th international match for New Zealand.
- Lockie Ferguson (NZ) took his 50th wicket in ODIs.
- Trent Boult (NZ) took his 150th wicket in ODIs.

8 June 2019
10:30
Scorecard

England; 386/6 (50 overs)	v	Bangladesh; 280 (48.5 overs)
Jason Roy 153 (121); Mehedi Hasan 2/67 (10 overs)		Shakib Al Hasan 121 (119); Ben Stokes 3/23 (6 overs)

England won by 106 runs
Sophia Gardens, Cardiff
Umpires: Kumar Dharmasena (SL) and Joel Wilson (WI)
Player of the match: Jason Roy (Eng)

- Bangladesh won the toss and elected to field.
- Mashrafe Mortaza (Ban) played in his 300th match for Bangladesh.
- England became the first team to make seven consecutive scores of 300 or more in ODIs.

11 June 2019
10:30
Scorecard

Bangladesh	v	Sri Lanka

Match abandoned
County Ground, Bristol
Umpires: Richard Illingworth (Eng) and Richard Kettleborough (Eng)

- No toss.
- No play was possible due to rain.

17 June 2019
10:30
Scorecard

West Indies; 321/8 (50 overs)	v	Bangladesh; 322/3 (41.3 overs)
Shai Hope 96 (121); Mustafizur Rahman 3/59 (9 overs)		Shakib Al Hasan 124* (99); Andre Russell 1/42 (6 overs)

Bangladesh won by 7 wickets
County Ground, Taunton
Umpires: Sundaram Ravi (Ind) and Rod Tucker (Aus)
Player of the match: Shakib Al Hasan (Ban)

- Bangladesh won the toss and elected to field.
- Mustafizur Rahman (Ban) played in his 50th ODI.
- Jason Holder (WI) played in his 100th ODI.
- Shai Hope played in his 100th international match for the West Indies.
- Shimron Hetmyer (WI) scored his 1,000th run in ODIs.
- Shakib Al Hasan became the second batsman for Bangladesh to score 6,000 runs in ODIs and became the fastest player, in terms of innings, to achieve the double of 6,000 runs and 250 wickets in ODIs (202 innings).
- This was Bangladesh's highest successful run chase in ODIs and second highest successful run chase in World Cup history.
- The 189 unbeaten run stand between Shakib Al Hasan and Liton Das was the highest partnership for Bangladesh for any wicket in the Cricket World Cup, and Bangladesh's highest fourth wicket partnership in ODIs.
- Andre Russell (WI) played in his last ODI match.

20 June 2019
10:30
Scorecard

Australia; 381/5 (50 overs)	v	Bangladesh; 333/8 (50 overs)
David Warner 166 (147); Soumya Sarkar 3/58 (8 overs)		Mushfiqur Rahim 102* (97); Marcus Stoinis 2/54 (8 overs)

Australia won by 48 runs
Trent Bridge, Nottingham
Umpires: Michael Gough (Eng) and Richard Kettleborough (Eng)
Player of the match: David Warner (Aus)

- Australia won the toss and elected to bat.
- David Warner (Aus) became the first batsman to score two 150+ scores in the Cricket World Cup.
- This was Australia's highest total against Bangladesh in ODIs.
- This was Bangladesh's highest total in ODIs.
- The 714 runs scored in the fixture was the highest match aggregate in a World Cup match.

24 June 2019
10:30
Scorecard

Bangladesh; 262/7 (50 overs)	v	Afghanistan; 200 (47 overs)
Mushfiqur Rahim 83 (87); Mujeeb Ur Rahman 3/39 (10 overs)		Samiullah Shinwari 49 (51); Shakib Al Hasan 5/29 (10 overs)

Bangladesh won by 62 runs
Rose Bowl, Southampton
Umpires: Michael Gough (Eng) and Richard Kettleborough (Eng)
Player of the match: Shakib Al Hasan (Ban)

- Afghanistan won the toss and elected to field.
- Soumya Sarkar (Ban) played in his 50th ODI.
- Gulbadin Naib played in his 100th international match for Afghanistan, and scored his 1,000th run in ODIs.
- Shakib Al Hasan became the first batsman for Bangladesh to score 1,000 runs in the Cricket World Cup, and the first bowler for Bangladesh to take a five-wicket haul in a World Cup match.
- Shakib Al Hasan also became the second cricketer, after Yuvraj Singh, to score 50 runs and take five wickets in the same match at the World Cup.
- Shakib Al Hasan became the only player to score 1,000 runs and pick up 30 wickets in the World Cup, and the only player to score 400 runs and take 10 wickets in a single tournament.

2 July 2019
10:30
Scorecard

India; 314/9 (50 overs)	v	Bangladesh; 286 (48 overs)
Rohit Sharma 104 (92); Mustafizur Rahman 5/59 (10 overs)		Shakib Al Hasan 66 (74); Jasprit Bumrah 4/55 (10 overs)

India won by 28 runs
Edgbaston, Birmingham
Umpires: Marais Erasmus (SA) and Ruchira Palliyaguruge (SL)
Player of the match: Rohit Sharma (Ind)

- India won the toss and elected to bat.
- Tamim Iqbal (Ban) played in his 200th ODI.
- Rohit Sharma (Ind) equalled Kumar Sangakkara's record of scoring most number of centuries (4) by any player in a single edition of the World Cup.
- Shakib Al Hasan (Ban) became the first cricketer in the World Cup to score 500 runs and take 10 wickets in a single tournament.
- India qualified for the semi-finals and Bangladesh were eliminated as a result of this match.

5 July 2019
10:30
Scorecard

Pakistan; 315/9 (50 overs)	v	Bangladesh; 221 (44.1 overs)
Imam-ul-Haq 100 (100); Mustafizur Rahman 5/75 (10 overs)		Shakib Al Hasan 64 (77); Shaheen Afridi 6/35 (9.1 overs)

Pakistan won by 94 runs
Lord's, London
Umpires: Michael Gough (Eng) and Richard Kettleborough (Eng)
Player of the match: Shaheen Afridi (Pak)

- Pakistan won the toss and elected to bat.
- Mustafizur Rahman became the fastest bowler for Bangladesh, in terms of innings, to take 100 wickets in ODIs (54 innings).
- Babar Azam scored the most runs by a Pakistan batsman in a single World Cup tournament (474).
- Shakib Al Hasan (Ban) equalled Sachin Tendulkar's record of making the most 50+ scores in a single World Cup tournament (7).
- Shaheen Afridi (Pak) became the youngest bowler to take a five-wicket haul in a World Cup match (19 years 90 days).
- Shaheen Afridi also took the best bowling figures by a bowler for Pakistan in a World Cup match.
- New Zealand qualified for the semi-finals and Pakistan were eliminated as a result of this match.

=== 2023 Cricket World Cup ===
Squad

- Najmul Hossain Shanto (c)
- Litton Das (wk)
- Mushfiqur Rahim (wk)
- Anamul Haque (wk)
- Tanzid Hasan
- Towhid Hridoy
- Mahmudullah
- Mehidy Hasan Miraz
- Mahedi Hasan
- Nasum Ahmed
- Taskin Ahmed
- Mustafizur Rahman
- Hasan Mahmud
- Shoriful Islam
- Tanzim Hasan Sakib

* Note: Anamul Haque replaced Shakib Al Hasan due to injury.

Results

League stage										Semifinal	Final	Overall Result
Opposition Result	Opposition Result	Opposition Result	Opposition Result	Opposition Result	Opposition Result	Opposition Result	Opposition Result	Opposition Result	Rank	Opposition Result	Opposition Result	Overall Result
Afghanistan; W by 6 wickets	England; L 137 runs	New Zealand; L by 8 wickets	India; L b y 7 wickets	South Africa; L by 149 runs	Netherlands; L by 87 runs	Pakistan; L by 7 wickets	Sri Lanka; W by 3 wickets	Australia; L by 8 wickets	8	Did not advance		League stage
Source: ESPNcricinfo

Scorecards

League stage

7 October 2023
10:30
Scorecard

Afghanistan; 156 (37.2 overs)	v	Bangladesh; 158/4 (34.4 overs)
Rahmanullah Gurbaz 47 (62); Mehidy Hasan 3/25 (9 overs)		Nazmul Hossain Shanto 59* (83); Azmatullah Omarzai 1/9 (2 overs)

Bangladesh won by 6 wickets
Himachal Pradesh Cricket Association Stadium, Dharamshala
Umpires: Kumar Dharmasena (SL) and Joel Wilson (WI)
Player of the match: Mehidy Hasan (Ban)

- Bangladesh won the toss and elected to field.
- Rahmanullah Gurbaz became the fastest player to score reach 1,000 runs in ODIs for Afghanistan in terms of innings (27).
- Bangladesh won the match with 92 balls to spare, their greatest win margin in the World Cups, in terms of balls remaining.

10 October 2023
10:30
Scorecard

England; 364/9 (50 overs)	v	Bangladesh; 227 (48.2 overs)
Dawid Malan 140 (107); Mahedi Hasan 4/71 (8 overs)		Liton Das 76 (66); Reece Topley 4/43 (10 overs)

England won by 137 runs
Himachal Pradesh Cricket Association Stadium, Dharamshala
Umpires: Ahsan Raza (Pak) and Paul Wilson (Aus)
Player of the match: Dawid Malan (Eng)

- Bangladesh won the toss and elected to field.
- Jonny Bairstow (Eng) played in his 100th ODI.
- Joe Root became England's highest run-scorer in World Cups, surpassing Graham Gooch (897 runs).

13 October 2023
14:00 (D/N)
Scorecard

Bangladesh; 245/9 (50 overs)	v	New Zealand; 248/2 (42.5 overs)
Mushfiqur Rahim 66 (75); Lockie Ferguson 3/49 (10 overs)		Daryl Mitchell 89* (67); Mustafizur Rahman 1/36 (8 overs)

New Zealand won by 8 wickets
M. A. Chidambaram Stadium, Chennai
Umpires: Kumar Dharmasena (SL) and Nitin Menon (Ind)
Player of the match: Lockie Ferguson (NZ)

- New Zealand won the toss and elected to field.
- Trent Boult surpassed Kyle Mills to become the fastest New Zealand bowler to claim 200 wickets in ODIs, in terms of matches (107), and third overall.

19 October 2023
14:00 (D/N)
Scorecard

Bangladesh; 256/8 (50 overs)	v	India; 261/3 (41.3 overs)
Liton Das 66 (82); Ravindra Jadeja 2/38 (10 overs)		Virat Kohli 103* (97); Mehidy Hasan 2/47 (10 overs)

India won by 7 wickets
Maharashtra Cricket Association Stadium, Pune
Umpires: Adrian Holdstock (SA) and Richard Kettleborough (Eng)
Player of the match: Virat Kohli (Ind)

- Bangladesh won the toss and elected to bat.
- Mushfiqur Rahim scored his 1,000th run in the World Cup.
- Virat Kohli (Ind) surpassed Sachin Tendulkar to become the fastest to reach 26,000 runs in international cricket, in terms of innings (567).

24 October 2023
14:00 (D/N)
Scorecard

South Africa; 382/5 (50 overs)	v	Bangladesh; 233 (46.4 overs)
Quinton de Kock 174 (140); Hasan Mahmud 2/67 (6 overs)		Mahmudullah 111 (111); Gerald Coetzee 3/62 (10 overs)

South Africa won by 149 runs
Wankhede Stadium, Mumbai
Umpires: Ahsan Raza (Pak) (Note: Ahsan Raza replaced Alex Wharf.) and Joel Wilson (WI)
Player of the match: Quinton de Kock (SA)

- South Africa won the toss and elected to bat.

28 October 2023
14:00 (D/N)
Scorecard

Netherlands; 229 (50 overs)	v	Bangladesh; 142 (42.2 overs)
Scott Edwards 68 (89); Mustafizur Rahman 2/36 (10 overs)		Mehidy Hasan 35 (40); Paul van Meekeren 4/23 (7.2 overs)

Netherlands won by 87 runs
Eden Gardens, Kolkata
Umpires: Joel Wilson (WI) and Paul Wilson (Aus)
Player of the match: Paul van Meekeren (Ned)

- Netherlands won the toss and elected to bat.

31 October 2023
14:00 (D/N)
Scorecard

Bangladesh; 204 (45.1 overs)	v	Pakistan; 205/3 (32.3 overs)
Mahmudullah 56 (70); Shaheen Afridi 3/23 (9 overs)		Fakhar Zaman 81 (74); Mehidy Hasan 3/60 (9 overs)

Pakistan won by 7 wickets
Eden Gardens, Kolkata
Umpires: Richard Kettleborough (Eng) and Nitin Menon (Ind)
Player of the match: Fakhar Zaman (Pak)

- Bangladesh won the toss and elected to bat.
- Shaheen Afridi (Pak) and Mehidy Hasan (Ban) both took their 100th wicket in ODIs.
- Bangladesh were eliminated as a result of this match.

6 November 2023
14:00 (D/N)
Scorecard

Sri Lanka; 279 (49.3 overs)	v	Bangladesh; 282/7 (41.1 overs)
Charith Asalanka 108 (105); Tanzim Hasan Sakib 3/80 (10 overs)		Najmul Hossain Shanto 90 (101); Dilshan Madushanka 3/69 (10 overs)

Bangladesh won by 3 wickets
Arun Jaitley Cricket Stadium, New Delhi
Umpires: Marais Erasmus (SA) and Richard Illingworth (Eng)
Player of the match: Shakib Al Hasan (Ban)

- Bangladesh won the toss and elected to field.
- Angelo Mathews (SL) became the first player in any international cricket match to be dismissed by being timed out.
- Sri Lanka were eliminated as the result of this match.
- This was Bangladesh's first win against Sri Lanka in Cricket World Cup.

11 November 2023
10:30
Scorecard

Bangladesh; 306/8 (50 overs)	v	Australia; 307/2 (44.4 overs)
Towhid Hridoy 74 (79); Adam Zampa 2/32 (10 overs)		Mitchell Marsh 177* (132); Taskin Ahmed 1/61 (10 overs)

Australia won by 8 wickets
Maharashtra Cricket Association Stadium, Pune
Umpires: Marais Erasmus (SA) and Ahsan Raza (Pak)
Player of the match: Mitchell Marsh (Aus)

- Australia won the toss and elected to field.
- This was the first time that Australia had successfully chased down a target of 300 or above in the World Cups.

== Records and statistics ==
=== Team records ===
Highest innings totals

Score	Opponent	Venue	Season
333/8 (50 overs)	Australia	Nottingham	2019
330/6 (50 overs)	South Africa	Kennington	2019
322/3 (41.3 overs)	West Indies	Taunton	2019
322/4 (48.1 overs)	Scotland	Nelson	2015
306/4 (50 overs)	Australia	Pune	2023
Last updated: 10 November 2023

Lowest innings totals

Score	Opponent	Venue	Season
58 (18.5 overs)	West Indies	Mirpur	2011
78 (28 overs)	South Africa	Mirpur	2011
108 (35.1 overs)	South Africa	Bloemfontein	2003
112 (37 overs)	Sri Lanka	Port of Spain	2007
116 (37.4 overs)	New Zealand	Chelmsford	1999
Last updated: 10 November 2023

=== Most appearances ===
This list consists players with most number of matches at the Cricket World Cup. Mushfiqur Rahim played a total of 38 World Cup matches, the most for the team. Shakib Al Hasan has captained the team in 14 matches, the most matches as captain for Bangladesh.

Matches	Player	Period
38	Mushfiqur Rahim	2007–2023
36	Shakib Al Hasan	2007–2023
29	Tamim Iqbal	2007–2019
25	Mahmudullah	2011–2023
24	Mashrafe Mortaza	2003–2019
Last updated: 10 November 2023

=== Batting statistics ===
Most runs

Runs	Player	Mat	Inn	Avg	100s	50s	Period
1332	Shakib Al Hasan	36	36	41.62	2	11	2007–2023
1079	Mushfiqur Rahman	38	37	34.80	1	8	2007–2023
944	Mahmudullah	25	22	52.44	3	3	2011–2023
718	Tamim Iqbal	29	29	24.75	—N/a	4	2007–2019
468	Litton Das	14	14	36.00	—N/a	3	2019–2023
Last updated: 10 November 2023

Highest individual innings

Score	Player	Opponent	Venue	Season
128*	Mahmudullah	New Zealand	Hamilton	2015
124*	Shakib Al Hasan	West Indies	Taunton	2019
121	Shakib Al Hasan	England	Cardiff	2019
111	Mahmudullah	South Africa	Wankhede, Mumbai	2023
103	Mahmudullah	England	Adelaide	2015
Last updated: 10 November 2023

Highest partnerships

Runs	Players	Opposition	Venue	Season
189* (4th wicket)	Shakib Al Hasan (80) & Litton Das (94)	v West Indies	Taunton	2019
169 (3rd wicket)	Shakib Al Hasan (82) & Najmul Hossain Shanto (83)	v Sri Lanka	Delhi	2023
142 (3rd wicket)	Shakib Al Hasan (69) & Mushfiqur Rahim (71)	v South Africa	Kennington	2019
141 (5th wicket)	Mushfiqur Rahim (80) & Mahmudullah (55)	v England	Adelaide	2015
139 (2nd wicket)	Tamim Iqbal (72) & Mahmudullah (62)	v Scotland	Nelson	2015
Last updated: 10 November 2023

=== Bowling statistics ===
Most wickets

Wickets	Player	Matches	Avg.	Econ.	4W	5W	Period
43	Shakib Al Hasan	36	36.06	5.14	1	1	2007–2023
25	Mustafizur Rahman	16	35.28	6.39	0	2	2019–2023
20	Abdur Razzak	15	28.20	4.63	0	0	2007–2011
19	Mashrafe Mortaza	24	53.15	5.39	1	0	2003–2019
16	Mehidy Hasan Miraz	16	46.43	5.34	0	0	2019–2023
Last updated: 10 November 2023

Best bowling figures

Bowling Figures	Overs	Player	Opponent	Venue	Season
5/29	10.0	Shakib Al Hasan	v Afghanistan	Southampton	2019
5/59	10.0	Mustafizur Rahman	v India	Birmingham	2019
5/75	10.0	Mustafizur Rahman	v Pakistan	Lord's	2015
4/21	8.0	Shafiul Islam	v Ireland	Mirpur	2011
4/38	9.3	Mashrafe Mortaza	v India	Port of Spain	2007
Last updated: 10 November 2023
