= Indian cricket team in Bangladesh in 2000–01 =

International cricket tour

Indian cricket team in Bangladesh in 2000
	Bangladesh	India
- Dates: 10 November – 14 November 2000
Captains	Naimur Rahman	Sourav Ganguly

Test series
- Result: India won the 1-match series 1–0
Most runs	Aminul Islam (151)	Sunil Joshi (92)
Most wickets	Naimur Rahman (6)	Sunil Joshi (8)

The Indian national cricket team visited Bangladesh in November 2000 to take part in the inaugural Test match played by the Bangladesh national cricket team, which India won by nine wickets. The tour consisted of the one-off Test match only. Bangladesh's Aminul Islam became the third batsman to make a century in their country's inaugural Test.

This was the first Test match played in present-day Bangladesh (previously East Pakistan) since Pakistan played against New Zealand in November 1969, just a few years before the Bangladesh Liberation War of 1971.

== Squads ==
Bangladesh Test	India Test
Akram Khan; Al Sahariar; Aminul Islam Bulbul; Habibul Bashar; Khaled Mashud (wk); Mehrab Hossain; Mohammad Rafique; Naimur Rahman (c); Ranjan Das; Hasibul Hossain; Shahriar Hossain	Shiv Sunder Das; Sadagoppan Ramesh; Murali Kartik; Rahul Dravid; Sachin Tendulkar; Sourav Ganguly (c); Saba Karim (wk); Sunil Joshi; Ajit Agarkar; Javagal Srinath; Zaheer Khan

== Only Test ==
10–13 November 2000
Scorecard

Bangladesh	v	India
400 (153.3 Overs); Aminul Islam 145 (380); Sunil Joshi 5/142 (45.3 Overs)		429 (141.3 Overs); Sunil Joshi 92 (180); Naimur Rahman 6/132 (44.3 Overs)
91 (46.3 Overs); Habibul Bashar 30 (63); Javagal Srinath 3/19 (11 Overs)		64/1 (15 Overs); Rahul Dravid 41 (49); Hasibul Hossain 1/31 (6 Overs)

India won by 9 wickets
Bangabandhu National Stadium, Dhaka
Umpires: Steve Bucknor (WI) and David Shepherd (Eng)
Player of the match: Sunil Joshi (Ind)

- Bangladesh won the toss and elected to bat.
- Akram Khan, Al Sahariar, Aminul Islam Bulbul, Habibul Bashar, Khaled Mashud, Mehrab Hossain, Mohammad Rafique, Naimur Rahman, Ranjan Das, Hasibul Hossain and Shahriar Hossain made their Test debuts for Bangladesh.
- Shiv Sunder Das, Saba Karim and Zaheer Khan made their debuts for India.
- Aminul Islam Bulbul became third cricketer in history to score a century on his country's inaugural test.
