= 1998–99 Meril International Tournament =

Meril International Tournament 1998–99
- Date: 19–27 March 1999
- Location: Bangladesh
- Result: WinnerZimbabwe(beating Kenya by 202 runs in the final)
- Player of the series: Andy Flower
Teams
Bangladesh	Kenya	Zimbabwe
Captains
Aminul Islam Bulbul	Aasif Karim	Alistair Campbell
Most runs
Mehrab Hossain 197	Steve Tikolo 187	Andy Flower 257
Most wickets
Hasibul Hossain 6	Thomas Odoyo 9	Grant Flower 7

The Meril International Tournament was a One Day International cricket tournament played by Bangladesh, Kenya and Zimbabwe. The tournament was held in Bangladesh from 19 March to 27 March 1999. Zimbabwe defeated Kenya by 202 runs in the final to win the tournament.

== Squads ==
Bangladesh	Kenya	Zimbabwe
Aminul Islam (c); Khaled Mashud (wk); Javed Omar; Mehrab Hossain; Al Sahariar; Akram Khan; Khaled Mahmud; Mohammad Rafique; Naimur Rahman; Hasibul Hossain; Manjural Islam; Shahriar Hossain; Shafiuddin Ahmed; Enamul Haque; Faruque Ahmed; Niamur Rashid; Jahangir Alam; Mahbubur Rahman; Aminul Islam, Jr.	Aasif Karim (c); Kennedy Otieno (wk); Maurice Odumbe; Ravindu Shah; Steve Tikolo; Sandip Gupta; Martin Suji; Tony Suji; Alpesh Vadher; Hitesh Modi; Thomas Odoyo; Dipak Chudasama; Joseph Angara; Mohammad Sheikh	Alistair Campbell (c); Andy Flower (wk); Eddo Brandes; Stuart Carlisle; Grant Flower; Murray Goodwin; Adam Huckle; Neil Johnson; Pommie Mbangwa; Henry Olonga; Paul Strang; Heath Streak; Dirk Viljoen; Guy Whittall; Andy Whittall

== Matches ==
=== Group stage ===
Pos	Team	P	W	L	NR	T	Points	NRR	For	Against
1	Zimbabwe	4	4	0	0	0	8	+1.649	1123 (199.3 overs)	796 (200.0 overs)
2	Kenya	4	2	2	0	0	4	–0.483	801 (193.5 overs)	923 (200.0 overs)
3	Bangladesh	4	0	4	0	0	0	–1.200	812 (200.0 overs)	1017 (193.2 overs)

= Qualified for Finals	= Did not qualify

19 March 1999
day/night
Scorecard

Zimbabwe; 272/6 (50 overs)	v	Kenya; 139 (44 overs)
Andy Flower 83(99); Thomas Odoyo 2/26 (10 overs)		Ravindu Shah 28(38); Paul Strang 5/22 (10 overs)

Zimbabwe won by 133 runs
Bangabandhu National Stadium, Dhaka
Umpires: Peter Manuel (SRI) and VK Ramaswamy (IND)
Player of the match: Paul Strang

- Points: Zimbabwe 2, Kenya 0.
- Zimbabwe won the toss and elected to bat.

20 March 1999
day/night
Scorecard

Bangladesh; 213 (50 overs)	v	Kenya; 215/2 (43.5 overs)
Shahriar Hossain 95 (145); Mohammad Sheikh 3/36 (8 overs)		Steve Tikolo 106 (111); Khaled Mahmud 1/30 (10 overs)

Kenya won by 8 wickets (with 37 balls remaining)
Bangabandhu National Stadium, Dhaka
Umpires: Javed Akhtar (PAK) and VK Ramaswamy (IND)
Player of the match: Steve Tikolo

- Points: Kenya 2, Bangladesh 0.
- Bangladesh won the toss and elected to bat.
- Aminul Islam, Jr. made his ODI debut for Bangladesh.

21 March 1999
day/night
Scorecard

Zimbabwe; 310/6 (50 overs)	v	Bangladesh; 184 (42.2 overs)
Andy Flower 79 (99); Shafiuddin Ahmed 2/38 (7 overs)		Mehrab Hossain 73 (109); Grant Flower 2/6 (3.2 overs)

Zimbabwe won by 126 runs
Bangabandhu National Stadium, Dhaka
Umpires: Javed Akhtar (PAK) and Peter Manuel (SRI)
Player of the match: Grant Flower

- Points: Zimbabwe 2, Bangladesh 0.
- Zimbabwe won the toss and elected to bat.

23 March 1999
day/night
Scorecard

Zimbabwe; 280/6 (50 overs)	v	Kenya; 216/8 (50 overs)
Neil Johnson 101 (120); Thomas Odoyo 2/40 (10 overs)		Steve Tikolo 78 (88); Grant Flower 4/32 (10 overs)

Zimbabwe won by 64 runs
Bangabandhu National Stadium, Dhaka
Umpires: Peter Manuel (SRI) and VK Ramaswamy (IND)
Player of the match: Neil Johnson

- Points: Zimbabwe 2, Kenya 0
- Zimbabwe won the toss and elected to bat.

24 March 1999
day/night
Scorecard

Kenya; 231 (48.3 overs)	v	Bangladesh; 158 (41.4 overs)
Kennedy Otieno 120 (137); Hasibul Hossain 4/56 (10 overs)		Akram Khan 65 (109); Mohammad Sheikh 4/36 (10 overs)

Kenya won by 73 runs
Bangabandhu National Stadium, Dhaka
Umpires: Javed Akhtar (PAK) and Peter Manuel (SRI)
Player of the match: Kennedy Otieno

- Points: Kenya 2, Bangladesh 0.
- Kenya won the toss and elected to bat.

25 March 1999
day/night
Scorecard

Bangladesh; 257/5 (50 overs)	v	Zimbabwe; 261/7 (49.3 overs)
Mehrab Hossain 101 (116); Neil Johnson2/42 (10 overs)		Alistair Campbell 97 (114); Hasibul Hossain 2/66 (9 overs)

Zimbabwe won by 3 wickets (with 3 balls remaining)
Bangabandhu National Stadium, Dhaka
Umpires: Javed Akhtar (PAK) and Peter Manuel (SRI)
Player of the match: Alistair Campbell

- Points: Zimbabwe 2, Bangladesh 0.
- Bangladesh won the toss and elected to bat.
- Mahbubur Rahman and Niamur Rashid made their ODI debut for Bangladesh.
- Mehrab Hossain became the first Bangladeshi to score a century in ODI.

=== Final ===
27 March 1999
day/night
Scorecard

Zimbabwe; 325/6 (50 overs)	v	Kenya; 123 (36.5 overs)
Grant Flower 140 (125); Martin Suji 2/31 (10 overs)		Thomas Odoyo 32 (55); Andy Whittall 3/29 (8.5 overs)

Zimbabwe won by 202 runs
Bangabandhu National Stadium, Dhaka
Umpires: Javed Akhtar (PAK) and VK Ramaswamy (IND)
Player of the match: Grant Flower

- Zimbabwe won the toss and elected to bat.
