= Pakistani cricket team in Bangladesh in 1998–99 =

	Bangladesh	Pakistan
- Date: 16 March 1999
Captains	Aminul Islam	Wasim Akram

One Day International series
- Results: Pakistan won the 1-match series 1–0
Most runs	Mohammad Rafique (29)	Inzamam-ul-Haq (70)
Most wickets	Hasibul Hossain (3)	Wajahatullah Wasti (3)

The Pakistan national cricket team played one one-day international against Bangladesh on 16 March 1999. The match was styled as the Meril Challenge Cup.

The match was held immediately prior to the Meril International Tournament 1998–99 between Bangladesh, Kenya and Zimbabwe.

The match was arranged when it appeared that the 1998–99 Asian Test Championship final between Pakistan and Sri Lanka would finish in four days. When the Test match finished after lunch on the fourth day, the one-day international was played on what would have been the fifth day.

== One Day International (ODI match) ==
16 March 1999 (D/N)
Scorecard
Wisden report

Pakistan; 293/7 (50 overs)	v	Bangladesh; 141 (40.5 overs)
Inzamam-ul-Haq 70 (79); Hasibul Hossain 3/50 (10 overs)		Mohammad Rafique 29 (19); Wajahatullah Wasti 3/36 (5 overs)

Pakistan won by 152 runs
Bangabandhu National Stadium, Dhaka
Umpires: DB Cowie (NZ) and DR Shepherd (ENG)
Player of the match: Inzamam-ul-Haq (PAK)

- Bangladesh won the toss and elected to field.
- Al Sahariar and Manjural Islam (both BAN) and Wajahatullah Wasti (PAK) made their ODI debuts
