= Shell Conference =

Cricket competition

The Shell Conference was a first-class cricket competition held in New Zealand in the 1997–98, 1998–99 and 1999–2000 seasons, sponsored by Shell.

== Background ==
New Zealand Cricket established the Shell Conference in 1997 in response to two problems. First, the Shell Trophy, the first-class competition contested by the six major association teams, was becoming expensive to run in its double round robin format. Second, it was felt that the standard of New Zealand cricket would be improved by holding a competition in which the six teams combined to make three teams, and adding a team from overseas to make a four-team single round robin format.

The three domestic teams were:

- Northern Conference, which selected its players from Northern Districts and Auckland
- Central Conference, which selected its players from Central Districts and Wellington
- Southern Conference, which selected its players from Canterbury and Otago

== 1997–98 ==
| Team | Played | Won | Lost | Drawn | Points |
|---|---|---|---|---|---|
| Northern Conference | 3 | 2 | 0 | 1 | 14 |
| Southern Conference | 3 | 2 | 1 | 0 | 12 |
| Central Conference | 3 | 1 | 1 | 1 | 6 |
| Bangladesh | 3 | 0 | 3 | 0 | 0 |

The final between Northern Conference and Southern Conference was drawn, giving Northern Conference the title.

Bangladesh were invited to take part in the first tournament as the fourth team. Bangladesh had just been promoted to One Day International status in June 1997, and it was assumed they would be granted Test status in the next few years. However, until the Shell Conference no Bangladesh team or player had ever played a first-class match, and the standard of play in the tournament was too high for them: they lost their first two matches by large margins well inside the allotted time, and their third after a more even match in which Al Sahariar scored the first first-class century in Bangladesh’s history.

Mark Bailey (Northern Conference) was the highest scorer in the tournament, with 293 runs at an average of 48.83. He also hit the highest score, 148 against Bangladesh, and was the only batsman to hit two centuries. Paul Wiseman (Southern Conference) took the most wickets, with 20 at an average of 20.25. Hasibul Hossain (Bangladesh) was the only bowler to take six wickets in an innings, with 6 for 143 against Northern Conference.

See also Bangladeshi cricket team in New Zealand in 1997–98

== 1998–99 ==
| Team | Played | Won | Lost | Drawn | Points |
|---|---|---|---|---|---|
| Southern Conference | 3 | 1 | 0 | 2 | 9 |
| Central Conference | 3 | 1 | 1 | 1 | 6 |
| Pakistan A | 3 | 0 | 0 | 3 | 3 |
| Northern Conference | 3 | 0 | 1 | 2 | 2 |

Southern Conference beat Central Conference in the final.

The New Zealand authorities had originally intended to invite Kenya to play as the fourth team, but after Bangladesh’s disappointing form in the 1997–98 competition they decided not to risk another inexperienced team and instead invited Pakistan A.

Matt Horne (Southern Conference) was the highest scorer, with 365 runs at 73.00. Wajahatullah Wasti (Pakistan A) made the highest score, 196. Craig McMillan (Central Conference) took the most wickets, 14 at 16.78, and also had the best figures, 6 for 71.

== 1999–2000 ==
| Team | Played | Won | Lost | Drawn |
|---|---|---|---|---|
| England A | 2 | 1 | 0 | 1 |
| North Island | 2 | 1 | 0 | 1 |
| South Island | 2 | 0 | 2 | 0 |

No points were awarded, and no victor was proclaimed.

New Zealand's major associations felt that the four-team Shell Conference was undermining the status of the Shell Trophy. It was replaced by a brief three-team competition which formed part of the England A tour to Bangladesh and New Zealand. It also briefly revived the matches between North Island and South Island, which had been held intermittently since 1903–04; the previous match had been in 1977–78.

Mathew Sinclair (North Island) made the most runs, 289 at 72.25, and had the highest score, 182. Paul Wiseman (South Island) took the most wickets, 14 at 19.14, and had the best figures, 7 for 114.

== Aftermath ==
Many New Zealand players had enjoyed the higher standard of conference cricket, but the tournament was discontinued after 1999–2000, and the Shell Trophy, which had been reduced to a single round-robin in 1997–98, was expanded to a double round-robin in 2000–01. (It reverted to its original name of the Plunket Shield in the 2009–10 season.)
