= Lincoln Green (New Zealand) =

Cricket ground in Lincoln, New Zealand

Coordinates: 43°38′39.16″S 172°27′41.05″E

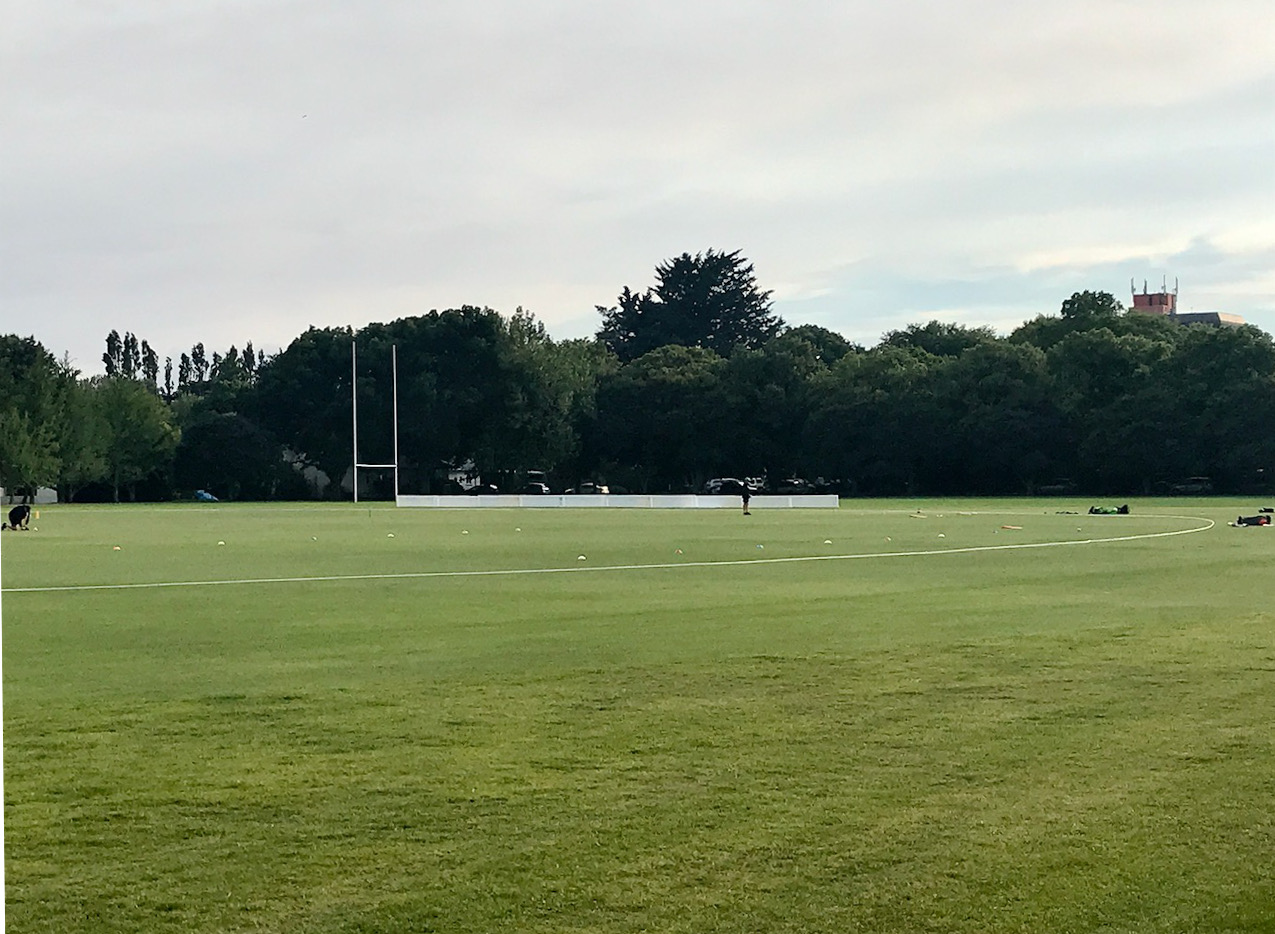
- Interactive map of Lincoln Green

Ground information
- Location: Lincoln, New Zealand
- Country: New Zealand
- Establishment: 1997 (first recorded match)

International information
- First women's ODI: 2 December 2000: India v Netherlands
- Last women's ODI: 16 December 2000: Australia v Netherlands
- As of 1 September 2020; Source: Ground profile

Lincoln Green is a cricket ground in Lincoln, Canterbury, New Zealand. The ground is located directly next to the Bert Sutcliffe Oval and forms part of the New Zealand Cricket Academy. The first recorded match on the ground came when New Zealand Women played New Zealand A Women team in February 1997. Later that year the ground held its first first-class match when the New Zealand Academy cricket team played Bangladesh, which the academy won against their opponents who had yet to gain Test status by an innings and 115 runs. Late the following year, the academy played Pakistan A. Two further first-class matches were later held there in the 1998/99 Shell Conference when the Southern Conference played the Central Conference and the Northern Conference. The final first-class match held there came in 1999 when New Zealand A played the touring South Africans.

The ground held nine Women's One Day Internationals during the 2000 Women's World Cup. Two years later the ground held six Youth One Day Internationals in the 2002 Under-19 World Cup.
