= Robin Jefferson =

New Zealand cricketer (1941–2026)

Personal information
- Full name: Robin Gerard Jefferson
- Born: 18 August 1941; Christchurch, New Zealand
- Died: 26 February 2026 (aged 84); Gisborne, New Zealand
- Batting: Left-handed
- Bowling: Right-arm medium
- Role: Batsman
- Relatives: Mark Jefferson (son)

Domestic team information
- Years: Team
- 1965/66: Southland
- 1965/66: Otago
- 1969/70: Wellington
- 1971/72–1973/74: Hutt Valley
- Source: CricInfo, 15 May 2016

Robin Gerard Jefferson (18 August 1941 – 26 February 2026) was a New Zealand cricketer and lawn bowls player.

== Biography ==
Jefferson was born at Christchurch in 1941. He made his representative debut for the Southland cricket team during the 1965–66 season, playing in the Hawke Cup for the side before going on to make his first-class cricket debut for Otago later in the season. He played in Otago's final two Plunket Shield matches of the season and played for Otago's B team the following season, without being recalled to the representative side.

By the 1967–68 season, Jefferson had moved to Wellington and played for the provincial B team during the season. He made three further first-class appearances for Wellington during the 1969–70 season and went on to play Hawke Cup cricket for Hutt Valley during the early 1970s. He scored a total of 94 runs in his five first-class matches, with a highest score of 26 not out.

As a lawn bowler, Jefferson was more successful, winning the New Zealand national pairs competition. His son, Mark Jefferson, played representative cricket for Wellington and Northern Districts, and rugby union for Poverty Bay.

Jefferson died in Gisborne on 26 February 2026, at the age of 84.
