= Mark Haslam =

New Zealand cricketer (born 1972)

Personal information
- Full name: Mark James Haslam
- Born: 26 September 1972; Bury, Lancashire, England
- Batting: Left-handed
- Bowling: Slow left-arm orthodox

International information
- National side: New Zealand (1992–1995)
- Test debut (cap 179): 1 November 1992 v Zimbabwe
- Last Test: 8 November 1995 v India
- Only ODI (cap 83): 13 December 1992 v Sri Lanka

Career statistics
Competition	Test	ODI	FC	LA
Matches	4	1	63	53
Runs scored	4	9	389	151
Batting average	4.00	9.00	7.78	10.06
100s/50s	0/0	0/0	0/0	0/0
Top score	3	9	30*	25
Balls bowled	493	30	9,967	1,583
Wickets	2	1	118	50
Bowling average	122.50	28.00	37.59	31.66
5 wickets in innings	0	0	1	0
10 wickets in match	0	0	0	0
Best bowling	1/33	1/28	5/25	4/33
Catches/stumpings	2/–	0/–	22/–	10/–
- Source: Cricinfo, 4 May 2017

Mark James Haslam (born 26 September 1972) is a former New Zealand international cricketer who played in four Test matches and a single One Day International between 1992 and 1995.

Mark Haslam was a slow left-arm orthodox spin bowler who played domestic cricket for Auckland from 1992 to 2001. His best first-class figures were 5 for 25 for Northern Conference against the touring Bangladeshis in 1997-98.

He is now the Assistant Middle School Principal of Kristin School, a private school on the North Shore of Auckland, New Zealand.
