= Northern Conference cricket team =

New Zealand cricket team

The Northern Conference cricket team played first-class and List A cricket in New Zealand in the 1997–98 and 1998–99 seasons.

== Background ==
New Zealand Cricket established the Shell Conference in 1997 in response to two problems. First, the Shell Trophy (also known as the Plunket Shield), the first-class competition contested by the six major association teams, was becoming expensive to run in its double round robin format. Second, it was felt that the standard of New Zealand cricket would be improved by holding a competition in which the six teams combined to make three teams, and adding a team from overseas to make a four-team single round robin format.

The three domestic teams were:

- Northern Conference, which selected its players from Northern Districts and Auckland
- Central Conference, which selected its players from Central Districts and Wellington
- Southern Conference, which selected its players from Canterbury and Otago

The overseas teams were Bangladesh in 1997–98 and Pakistan A in 1998–99.

The format was abandoned after the 1998–99 season. In 2000–01 the Plunket Shield resumed its place as New Zealand’s only first-class competition, returning to its double round robin format.

== Playing record ==
Northern Conference played seven first-class matches, winning two, drawing four and losing one. They played four List A matches, winning the first two and losing the next two.

1997–98: Captained by Dion Nash, Northern Conference won the first-class competition in 1997–98. They won their first two matches—Bangladesh by an innings and Southern Conference by 86 runs—and finished on top of the table after the round robin, then drew the final against Southern Conference with a first-innings lead.

Of the seven centuries scored in the competition, Northern Conference batsmen scored four: two to Mark Bailey and one each to Nash and Blair Pocock. Of the 10 bowlers who took 10 or more wickets in the competition, four were Northern Conference bowlers, of whom Mark Haslam had the best average, 13 wickets at 13.23.

1998–99: Again captained by Nash in 1998–99, Northern Conference drew their first match when a sub-standard pitch caused its abandonment, and drew their last, which was curtailed by rain. In between they lost by an innings to Central Conference. They finished last. None of their batsmen scored a century, and their best bowler was Daniel Vettori, who took nine wickets.

== See also ==
- Shell Conference
