= Southern Conference cricket team =

New Zealand cricket team

The Southern Conference cricket team played first-class and List A cricket in New Zealand in the 1997–98 and 1998–99 seasons.

== Background ==
New Zealand Cricket established the Shell Conference in 1997 in response to two problems. First, the Shell Trophy (also known as the Plunket Shield), the first-class competition contested by the six major association teams, was becoming expensive to run in its double round robin format. Second, it was felt that the standard of New Zealand cricket would be improved by holding a competition in which the six teams combined to make three teams, and adding a team from overseas to make a four-team single round robin format.

The three domestic teams were:

- Northern Conference, which selected its players from Northern Districts and Auckland
- Central Conference, which selected its players from Central Districts and Wellington
- Southern Conference, which selected its players from Canterbury and Otago

The overseas teams were Bangladesh in 1997–98 and Pakistan A in 1998–99.

The format was abandoned after the 1998–99 season. In 2000–01 the Plunket Shield resumed its place as New Zealand’s only first-class competition, returning to its double round robin format.

== Playing record ==
Southern Conference played eight first-class matches, winning four, drawing three and losing one. They played in both finals, drawing in 1997–98 and winning in 1998–99. They also played three List A matches, losing two with one no-result.

1997–98: Captained by Darrin Murray, Southern Conference beat Central Conference and Bangladesh and lost to Northern Conference in the round robin before drawing with Northern Conference in the final. As Northern Conference had finished in first place after the round robin, they were declared the winners of the competition. Craig Cumming made the most runs for Southern Conference, 255 at an average of 36.42, and Murray made the team’s highest score, 110. Paul Wiseman and Warren Wisneski were the two top wicket-takers in the competition, Wiseman with 20 at an average of 20.25, Wisneski with 18 at 20.88.

1998–99: Captained by Stephen Fleming in 1998–99, Southern Conference again beat Central Conference, drew with Pakistan A and Northern Conference in the round robin, then beat Central Conference in the final by 46 runs. Matt Horne was their highest run-scorer, with 365 runs at 73.00, and Chris Harris made their highest score of 159 not out. Paul Wiseman again took the most wickets, 12 at 41.41, and Chris Cairns had the best figures, 5 for 44.

== See also ==
- Shell Conference
