= Central Conference cricket team =

New Zealand cricket team

The Central Conference cricket team played first-class and List A cricket in New Zealand in the 1997–98 and 1998–99 seasons.

== Background ==
New Zealand Cricket established the Shell Conference in 1997 in response to two problems. First, the Shell Trophy (also known as the Plunket Shield), the first-class competition contested by the six major association teams, was becoming expensive to run in its double round robin format. Second, it was felt that the standard of New Zealand cricket would be improved by holding a competition in which the six teams combined to make three teams, and adding a team from overseas to make a four-team single round robin format.

The three domestic teams were:

- Northern Conference, which selected its players from Northern Districts and Auckland
- Central Conference, which selected its players from Central Districts and Wellington
- Southern Conference, which selected its players from Canterbury and Otago

The overseas teams were Bangladesh in 1997–98 and Pakistan A in 1998–99.

The format was abandoned after the 1998–99 season. In 2000–01 the Plunket Shield resumed its place as New Zealand’s only first-class competition, returning to its double round robin format.

== Playing record ==
Central Conference played seven first-class matches, winning two, drawing two and losing three. They played four List A matches, winning the first three and losing the last.

1997–98: Captained by Mark Greatbatch, Central Conference finished third in the first-class competition in 1997–98 with a win (against Bangladesh) a draw and a loss. Mathew Sinclair made the most runs, 203 at an average of 50.75, and made the team’s highest score, 95. Their most successful bowler was Campbell Furlong, with 12 wickets at an average of 18.91, and the best figures were 5 for 42 by Mark Jefferson.

1998–99: Captained by Craig McMillan in 1998–99, Central Conference again had a win, a draw and a loss, which this time was sufficient to take them into the final, where they lost by 46 runs to Southern Conference. Sinclair was again their highest scorer, with 285 runs at 40.71, and Craig Spearman made their highest score of 137. McMillan took the most wickets in the competition, 14 at 16.78, and also had the best figures, 6 for 71.

== See also ==
- Shell Conference
