= Warren Wisneski =

New Zealand cricketer (born 1969)

Personal information
- Full name: Warren Anthony Wisneski
- Born: 19 February 1969 (age 57); New Plymouth, Taranaki, New Zealand
- Batting: Right-handed
- Bowling: Right-arm medium

International information
- National side: New Zealand
- ODI debut (cap 112): 17 February 2000 v Australia
- Last ODI: 26 February 2000 v Australia

Career statistics
Competition	ODI	FC	LA
Matches	3	71	80
Runs scored	10	1,750	519
Batting average	10.00	21.60	14.41
100s/50s	0/0	0/9	0/0
Top score	6	89*	45*
Balls bowled	114	13,672	3,858
Wickets	0	248	101
Bowling average	–	26.06	28.29
5 wickets in innings	–	12	1
10 wickets in match	–	0	0
Best bowling	–	7/151	6/43
Catches/stumpings	1/–	46/–	32/–
- Source: Cricinfo, 20 April 2017

Warren Anthony Wisneski (born 19 February 1969) is a former New Zealand cricketer who played three One Day Internationals in 2000.

An uncompromising "into the wind" opening or first-change bowler, and useful lower-order batsman, Wisneski played first-class cricket for Central Districts from 1992 to 1996, and for Canterbury from 1996 to 2004. His best first-class bowling figures were 7 for 151 for Canterbury against Auckland in 2000–01. In the Shell Trophy final in 1997–98, he scored 89 not out, setting a new record for a number 11 batsman in New Zealand first-class cricket; he and Lee Germon added 160 for the tenth wicket in 143 minutes.

He also played for Taranaki in the Hawke Cup. He retired from all cricket in 2004.

He was an important member of the relief teams in Christchurch immediately after the 2010 and 2011 Christchurch earthquakes.
