= Shahriar Hossain =

Bangladeshi cricketer (born 1975)

Shahriar hossain
Personal information
- Born: August 20, 1975 (age 51); Munshiganj, Dhaka, Bangladesh
- Batting: Right-handed
- Role: All rounder

International information
- National side: Bangladesh
- Test debut (cap 11): 10 November 2000 v India
- Last Test: 26 February 2004 v Zimbabwe
- ODI debut (cap 36): 10 October 1997 v Kenya
- Last ODI: 15 May 2004 v West Indies
- ODI shirt no.: 3 (previously 4)

Career statistics
Competition	Test	ODI
Matches	3	20
Runs scored	99	362
Batting average	7.67	19.05
100s/50s	0/0	0/2
Top score	42	95
Catches/stumpings	0/1	5/0
- Source: CricInfo, 27 June 2022

Shahriar Hossain (Bengali: শাহরিয়ার হোসেন) is a Bangladeshi former cricketer who played in three Test matches from 2000 to 2004. He was also one of the members of the Bangladesh team in the 1999 World Cup.

== In Test matches ==
He failed in the match against India, scoring just 12 and 7. In his next match, four years later, he scored his highest, 48, against Zimbabwe at Harare. Nevertheless, he was dropped after the tour.

== In ODIs ==
He had a very successful 1999. At Dhaka, in March, he scored 95 against Kenya, narrowly missing out on his chance to become the first Bangladeshi to score a hundred in ODI. later, he scored 68 against more powerful Zimbabwe. In this match, he shared a 170 run first wicket partnership with Mehrab Hossain. In the WC, his 39 against Pakistan at Northampton helped Bangladesh achieve a famous win. He finished the year with knocks of 45 & 47 against West Indies at Dhaka. Injuries, however, has shortened his international career.

== Other matches ==
In 1993, he was part of the Bangladesh under-19 team. In 1995, he played for the Bangladesh A side. In 1996, he represented the full national squad.
