= Mark Jefferson (cricketer) =

New Zealand cricketer (born 1976)

Mark Robin Jefferson (born 28 June 1976 in Oamaru, Otago) is a New Zealand cricketer who has played for Wellington and Northern Districts in the State Championship and the State Shield.

Jefferson was also an accomplished rugby player and represented the New Zealand Schoolboys and Under 19 teams in 1995. He played for Poverty Bay in 1995 and 1996. After pursuing his cricket career, Jefferson later returned to play rugby for, and captain, Poverty Bay in 2004 and 2005. In all, he played 33 games for Poverty Bay.
