= Mark Bailey (cricketer) =

New Zealand cricketer (born 1970)

Cricket information
- Batting: Right-handed
- Bowling: Right-arm medium
Medal record
Representing New Zealand
Men's Cricket
Commonwealth Games
Bronze medal – third place	1998 Kuala Lumpur	List-A cricket
- Source: CricInfo, 14 July 2021

Mark David Bailey (born 26 November 1970) is a former New Zealand international cricketer who played in one One Day International for the New Zealand national cricket team.

Bailey was born at Hamilton in 1970. He played 89 first-class and 114 list A matches, mainly for Northern Districts in a career which lasted between 1989/90 and 2001/02. He made his New Zealand debut at the 1998 Commonwealth Games before playing his only One Day International during an ICC knockout tournament in Bangladesh.
