= Hasibul Hossain =

Bangladeshi cricketer (born 1977)

Personal information
- Full name: Mohammad Hasibul Hossain
- Born: 3 June 1977 (age 49); Barlekha, Moulavibazar, Sylhet, Bangladesh
- Nickname: Shanto
- Batting: Right-handed
- Bowling: Right-arm fast-medium

International information
- National side: Bangladesh (1995–2004)
- Test debut (cap 5): 10 November 2000 v India
- Last Test: 26 December 2001 v New Zealand
- ODI debut (cap 30): 6 April 1995 v Sri Lanka
- Last ODI: 27 December 2004 v India
- ODI shirt no.: 13

Career statistics
Competition	Test	ODI	FC
Matches	5	32	52
Runs scored	97	172	86
Batting average	10.77	8.59	11.82
100s/50s	0/0	0/0	0/2
Top score	31	21*	61*
Balls bowled	780	1,375	8,949
Wickets	6	29	172
Bowling average	95.16	46.13	27.43
5 wickets in innings	0	0	11
10 wickets in match	0	0	4
Best bowling	2/125	4/56	6/41
Catches/stumpings	1/–	6/–	13/–
- Source: ESPNcricinfo, 8 November 2016

Mohammad Hasibul Hossain (Bengali: মোহাম্মদ হাসিবুল হোসেন) (born 3 June 1977), known as Hasibul Hossain, played five Tests (2000–01) and 32 One-Day Internationals (1995–2004) for Bangladesh.

Hasibul Hossain made his ODI debut at Sharjah against Sri Lanka in 1995 at the age of 17, when he got the important wicket of Roshan Mahanama. The fastest bowler in the country, Hasibul Hossain continued on to play regularly for Bangladesh for a number of years. His best bowling performance in ODIs came at Dhaka in 1999 when he took 4 for 56 against Kenya. In 1999 he enjoyed a good Cricket World Cup in the UK. He took the first two wickets cheaply against Scotland at Edinburgh to help Bangladesh achieve their maiden win in a World Cup match.

He played in Bangladesh's first first-class match, on the tour of New Zealand in 1997-98, in the innings loss to the Northern Conference team, when he stood out, taking 6 for 143, as well as taking Bangladesh's first first-class wicket and hitting Bangladesh's first first-class six. He later played in Bangladesh's first Test (bowling Bangladesh's first ball in Test cricket) and in four other Tests between November 2000 and December 2001, but with little success.

He had an outstanding season for Sylhet Division in 2005–06, when in nine first-class matches he took 57 wickets at an average of 16.00 to lead the national bowling aggregates and averages, taking five or more wickets in an innings seven times, and 10 or more wickets in a match twice. However, injuries and overstepping problems reduced his effectiveness, and he played his last first-class match for Sylhet in 2007.
