= Al Sahariar =

Bangladeshi cricketer (born 1978)

Al Sahariar Rokon
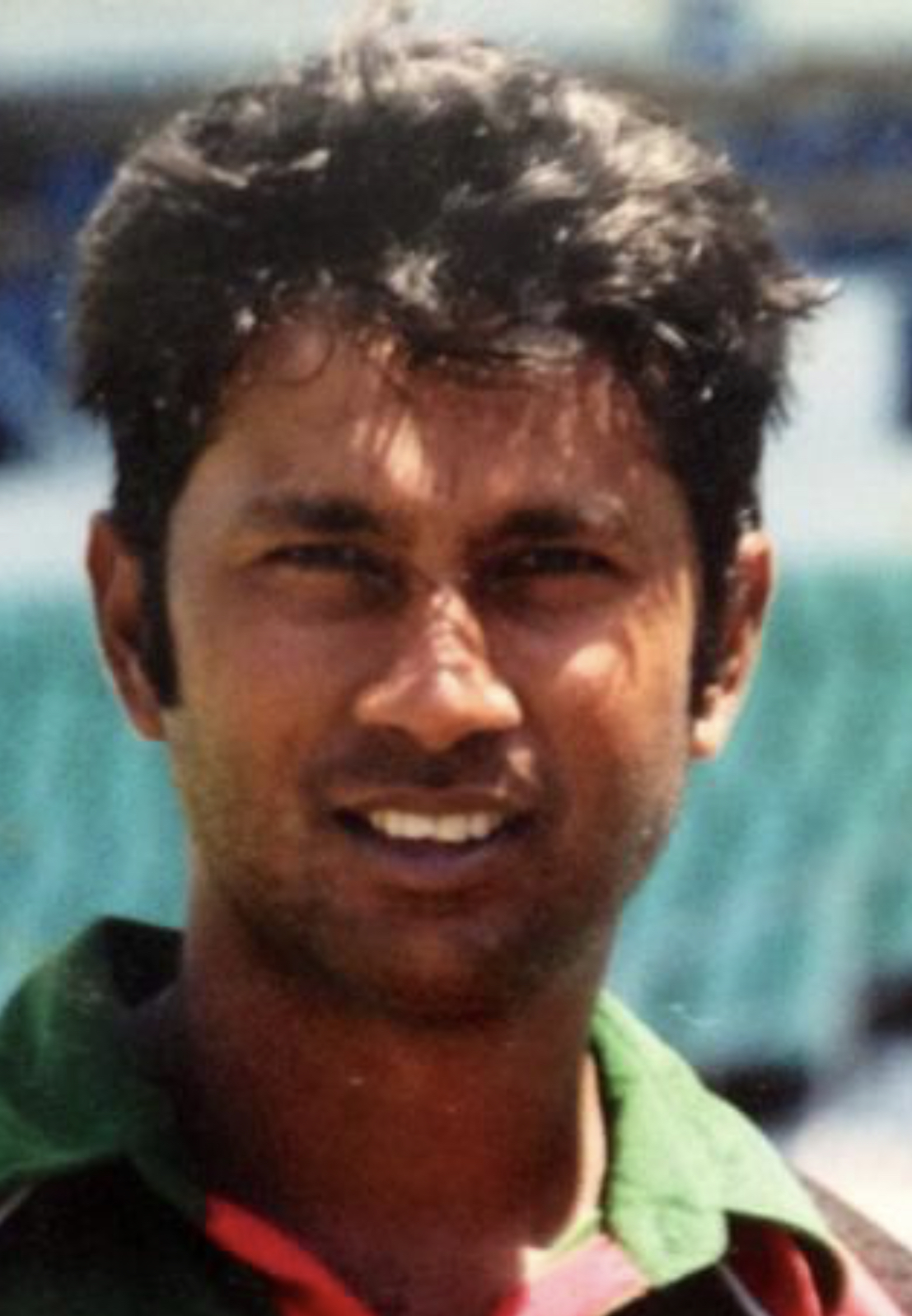

Personal information
- Born: April 23, 1978 (age 48); Dhaka, Bangladesh
- Height: 1.81 m (5 ft 11 in)
- Batting: Right-handed
- Bowling: Leg-break

International information
- National side: Bangladesh
- Test debut (cap 2): 10 November 2000 v India
- Last Test: 18 July 2003 v Australia
- ODI debut (cap 44): 16 March 1999 v Pakistan
- Last ODI: 3 August 2003 v Australia
- ODI shirt no.: 33 (previously 1)

Career statistics
| Competition | Tests | ODIs | FC |
|---|---|---|---|
| Matches | 15 | 29 | 68 |
| Runs scored | 683 | 374 | 3596 |
| Batting average | 22.76 | 13.35 | 29.96 |
| 100s/50s | 0/4 | 0/2 | 4/24 |
| Top score | 71 | 62* | 128* |
| Balls bowled | – | – | 416 |
| Wickets | – | – | 3 |
| Bowling average | – | – | 90.66 |
| 5 wickets in innings | – | – | 0 |
| 10 wickets in match | – | – | 0 |
| Best bowling | – | – | 1/46 |
| Catches/stumpings | 10/– | 7/– | 41/– |
- Source: Cricinfo, 16 June 2020

Mohammad Al-Sahariar (born 23 April 1978), also known as Al-Sahariar Rokon and Al Sahariar, is a Bangladeshi Test and one-day cricketer.

Al Sahariar scored Bangladesh's first first-class century with 102 against New Zealand In their third match in the New Zealand Shell Conference in 1997–98, two years before Bangladesh began playing domestic first-class cricket. He was one of the original eleven Bangladeshi Test cricketers, playing in Bangladesh's inaugural Test against India in November 2000. He didn't have much of an international career due to Bangladesh's early stages in regular international tournaments, but did reasonably well in domestic cricket. Al Sahariar played 15 Tests, but patchy form led to his exclusion from the team that toured the West Indies in 2003; he played no further Tests or One-day internationals.

Al Sahariar, widely known as "Rokon", was highly regarded by Bangladesh coach Trevor Chappel, who described him as a powerful hitter of the ball and an immensely gifted batsman. However, like many of the young Bangladeshi players at the time, he struggled for consistency in international cricket and found himself in and out of the national team.

Al Sahariar consistently garnered praise for his excellence in shorter formats, but it was his standout performances in the realm of first-class cricket that earned him a coveted position in the Bangladesh playing XI for their historic inaugural Test against India in November 2000. Despite an unremarkable debut in the Test arena, Al Sahariar made a strong comeback in subsequent match against Zimbabwe, marking his first half-century in Test cricket. Noteworthy is the fact that is middle-order batsman from Bangladesh eventually went on to secure four Test centuries, all achieved in second innings, with a significant three of them taking place in Test matches held overseas.

Sahariar left an indelible mark on domestic cricket, demonstrating his prowess while representing both Abahani and Mohammedan Sporting Club. A product of renowned sports institute BKSP, he honed his cricketing skills in various age-group teams before catching the attention of selectors in 1993 for a BCB Eleven, showcasing his adeptness at legspin bowling. Despite his appearances in representative teams globally, it wasn't until six years later that he finally earned his ODI Debut. The opportunity came during an impromptu ODI clash between Bangladesh and Pakistan, hastily arranged on the unusual final day of the Asian Test Championships' final at the Bangabandhu National Stadium in March 1999. This delay in his ODI initiation adds a distinctive chapter to Sahariar's cricket journey, emphasizing his domestic triumphs and the eventual breakthrough on the international stage.

Later in his life he moved to New Zealand and represented Hawke's Bay in the Hawke Cup. He returned to Bangladesh to play for Cricket Coaching School in the Dhaka Premier Division limited-overs competition in 2011–12. Al Sahariar moved into New Zealand with his wife (Pinky Mahjabin), three-year-old son (Sameer Al Sahariar), and was expecting a daughter to join their family later that year (Naisa Simran Sahariar).

== Career highlights ==
- Test debut: Only Test, Bangladesh vs. India, Dhaka, November 2000.
- Highest Test score: 71 vs. South Africa, East London, October 2002.
- ODI debut: Bangladesh vs. Pakistan, Dhaka, March 1999.
- Highest ODI score: 62 not out vs. West Indies, Dhaka, October 1999.
- Bangladesh's first first-class century: 102 against New Zealand, New Zealand Shell Conference in 1997–1998.
