= Mehrab Hossain (cricketer, born 1978) =

Bangladeshi cricketer (born 1978)

Personal information
- Full name: Mehrab Hossain
- Born: 22 September 1978 (age 48); Dhaka, Bangladesh
- Nickname: Opee
- Batting: Right-handed
- Bowling: Right-arm medium

International information
- National side: Bangladesh (1998–2003)
- Test debut (cap 7): 10 November 2000 v India
- Last Test: 1 May 2003 v South Africa
- ODI debut (cap 42): 14 May 1998 v India
- Last ODI: 17 April 2003 v South Africa
- ODI shirt no.: (previously 5)

Domestic team information
- Years: Team
- 2001/02–2008: Dhaka Division
- 2000/01: Dhaka Metropolis

Career statistics
Competition	Test	ODI	FC	LA
Matches	9	18	58	69
Runs scored	241	449	2,805	1,583
Batting average	13.38	24.49	28.91	24.73
100s/50s	0/1	1/2	5/13	2/8
Top score	71	101	169	155*
Balls bowled	12	30	1,121	721
Wickets	0	0	19	21
Bowling average	–	–	32.63	25.38
5 wickets in innings	–	–	0	1
10 wickets in match	–	–	0	0
Best bowling	–	–	2/6	5/19
Catches/stumpings	6/–	6/–	38/–	22/–
- Source: Cricinfo.com, 14 February 2009

Mehrab Hossain (Bengali: মেহরাব হোসেন; born 22 September 1978) is a Bangladeshi cricketer who played in 9 Test matches and 18 One Day Internationals from 1998 to 2003.

His 101 against Zimbabwe at Bangabandhu National Stadium in Dhaka in 1999 made him the first Bangladeshi cricketer to score a century in ODIs.

Mehrab is associated with an extremely unfortunate incident. On 20 February 1998, Raman Lamba, formerly a Delhi swashbuckling opening batsman, fielding close to the bat, copped one on the skull off the bat of Mehrab Hossain. Lamba died of the injury later in the day. Mehrab was deeply affected by the incident and took a spell off the game. He came back later to play for Bangladesh.
