= Bangladesh at the Men's T20 World Cup =

Bangladesh team performance at T20 World Cup

The Bangladesh cricket team is one of the full members of the International Cricket Council (ICC). Their best performance in the tournament came in 2024 edition as they finished at 7th place, they had also reached the Super 8 stage in the inaugural season in 2007. In nine editions, the team has a win-loss record of 12-31 wins in 44 matches. Bangladesh also hosted the 2014 World Cup.

The team had appeared in every edition of the tournament until 2026, when it withdrew from the 2026 World Cup after qualifying, citing risks to safety and well-being of the players and declining to play matches in India.

== T20 World Cup record ==
Key
Champions
Runners-up
Semi-finals
Host

Year	Round	Position	GP	W	L	T	NR	Ab (Note: Abandoned matches are not counted in the official records.)	Captain
(South Africa) 2007	Super 8s	8/12	5	1	4	0	0	0	Mohammad Ashraful
(England) 2009	Group stage	10/12	2	0	2	0	0	0	Mohammad Ashraful
(Cricket West Indies) 2010	Group stage	10/12	2	0	2	0	0	0	Shakib Al Hasan
(Sri Lanka) 2012	Group stage	10/12	2	0	2	0	0	0	Mushfiqur Rahim
(Bangladesh) 2014	Super 10	10/16	7	2	5	0	0	0	Mushfiqur Rahim
(India) 2016	Super 10	10/16	7	2	4	0	1	0	Mashrafe Mortaza
(United Arab Emirates) (Oman) 2021	Super 12	11/16	8	2	6	0	0	0	Mahmudullah
(Australia) 2022	Super 12	9/16	5	2	3	0	0	0	Shakib Al Hasan
(Cricket West Indies) (United States) 2024	Super 8	7/20	7	3	4	0	0	0	Najmul Hossain Shanto
(India) (Sri Lanka) 2026	Qualified; withdrew								
Total	0 titles	9/10	45	12	32	0	1	0	—N/a

=== Record by opponents ===
Opponent	M	W	L	T+W	T+L	NR	Ab	Win %	First played
Afghanistan	2	1	1	0	0	0	0	50.00	2014
Australia	6	0	6	0	0	0	0	0.00	2007
England	1	0	1	0	0	0	0	0.00	2021
Hong Kong	1	0	1	0	0	0	0	0.00	2014
India	5	0	5	0	0	0	0	0.00	2009
Ireland	2	0	1	0	0	1	0	0.00	2009
Nepal	2	2	0	0	0	0	0	100	2014
Netherlands	3	3	0	0	0	0	0	100	2016
New Zealand	2	0	2	0	0	0	0	0.00	2012
Oman	2	2	0	0	0	0	0	100	2016
Pakistan	6	0	6	0	0	0	0	0.00	2007
Papua New Guinea	1	1	0	0	0	0	0	100	2021
Scotland	1	0	1	0	0	0	0	0.00	2021
South Africa	4	0	4	0	0	0	0	0.00	2007
Sri Lanka	3	1	2	0	0	0	0	33.33	2007
West Indies	3	1	2	0	0	0	0	33.33	2007
Zimbabwe	1	1	0	0	0	0	0	100	2022
Total	45	12	32	0	0	1	0	26.66	—
Source: Last Updated: 24 June 2024

== Tournament results ==
=== South Africa 2007 ===
Squad

- Mohammad Ashraful (c)
- Mashrafe Mortaza (vc)
- Aftab Ahmed
- Junaid Siddique
- Mushfiqur Rahim (wk)
- Nadif Chowdhury
- Mohammed Nazimuddin
- Tamim Iqbal
- Alok Kapali
- Farhad Reza
- Mahmudullah
- Shakib Al Hasan
- Ziaur Rahman
- Abdur Razzak
- Syed Rasel

Results

Group stage (Group A)			Super 8s (Group F)				Semifinal	Final	Overall Result
Opposition Result	Opposition Result	Rank	Opposition Result	Opposition Result	Opposition Result	Rank	Opposition Result	Opposition Result	Overall Result
West Indies; W by 6 wickets	South Africa; L by 7 wickets	2	Australia; L by 9 wickets	Sri Lanka; L by 64 runs	Pakistan; L by 4 wickets	4	Did not advance		Super 8s
Source: ESPNcricinfo

Scorecards

Group stage (Group A)

13 September
10:00
(scorecard)

West Indies; 164/8 (20 overs)	v	Bangladesh; 165/4 (18 overs)
Devon Smith 51 (52); Shakib Al Hasan 4/34 (4 overs)		Aftab Ahmed 62 (49); Ramnaresh Sarwan 2/10 (2 overs)

Bangladesh won by 6 wickets
Wanderers Stadium, Johannesburg
Umpires: Mark Benson (Eng) and Nigel Llong (Eng)
Player of the match: Mohammad Ashraful (Ban)

- Bangladesh won the toss and elected to field.
- Bangladesh qualified for the Super 8s as a result of this match.

15 September
18:00
(scorecard)

Bangladesh; 144 (19.3 overs)	v	South Africa; 146/3 (18.5 overs)
Aftab Ahmed 36 (14); Shaun Pollock 3/40 (3.3 overs)		Albie Morkel 41 (29); Abdur Razzak 2/26 (4 overs)

South Africa won by 7 wickets
Newlands Cricket Ground, Cape Town
Umpires: Asad Rauf (Pak) and Tony Hill (NZ)
Player of the match: Morne Morkel (SA)

- South Africa won the toss and elected to field.

Super 8 (Group F)

16 September
14:00
(scorecard)

Bangladesh; 123/8 (20 overs)	v	Australia; 124/1 (13.5 overs)
Tamim Iqbal 32 (40); Brett Lee 3/27 (4 overs)		Matthew Hayden 73* (48)

Australia won by 9 wickets
Newlands Cricket Ground, Cape Town
Umpires: Asad Rauf (Pak) and Ian Howell (SA)
Player of the match: Brett Lee (Aus)

- Australia won the toss and elected to field.

18 September
18:00
(scorecard)

Sri Lanka; 147/5 (20 overs)	v	Bangladesh; 83 (15.5 overs)
Jehan Mubarak 31* (19); Mahmudullah 1/19 (4 overs)		Aftab Ahmed 18 (11); Sanath Jayasuriya 2/4 (1.5 overs)

Sri Lanka won by 64 runs
Wanderers Stadium, Johannesburg
Umpires: Mark Benson (Eng) and Daryl Harper (Aus)
Player of the match: Dilhara Fernando (SL)

- Bangladesh won the toss and elected to field.
- Bangladesh were eliminated from the tournament.

20 September
14:00
(scorecard)

Bangladesh; 140 (19.4 overs)	v	Pakistan; 141/6 (19 overs)
Junaid Siddique 71 (49); Shoaib Malik 2/15 (2 overs)		Shahid Afridi 39 (15); Abdur Razzak 2/16 (4 overs)

Pakistan won by 4 wickets
Newlands Cricket Ground, Cape Town
Umpires: Ian Howell (SA) and Tony Hill (NZ)
Player of the match: Junaid Siddique (Ban)

- Pakistan won the toss and elected to field.

=== England 2009 ===
Squad

- Mohammad Ashraful (c)
- Mashrafe Mortaza (vc)
- Tamim Iqbal
- Junaid Siddique
- Mushfiqur Rahim (wk)
- Raqibul Hasan
- Shamsur Rahman
- Mahmudullah
- Naeem Islam
- Shakib Al Hasan
- Abdur Razzak
- Rubel Hossain
- Shahadat Hossain
- Syed Rasel
- Mithun Ali

Results

Group stage (Group A)			Super 8s		Semifinal	Final	Overall Result
Opposition Result	Opposition Result	Rank	Opposition Result	Rank	Opposition Result	Opposition Result	Overall Result
India; L by 25 runs	Ireland; L by 6 wickets	3	Did not advance				Group stage
Source: ESPNcricinfo

Scorecards

Group stage (Group A)

6 June 2009
18:00 (D/N)
Scorecard

India; 180/5 (20 overs)	v	Bangladesh; 155/8 (20 overs)
Gautam Gambhir 50 (46); Naeem Islam 2/32 (3 overs)		Junaid Siddique 41 (22); Pragyan Ojha 4/21 (4 overs)

India won by 25 runs
Trent Bridge, Nottingham
Umpires: Billy Bowden (NZ) and Simon Taufel (Aus)
Player of the match: Pragyan Ojha (Ind)

- India won the toss and elected to bat.

8 June 2009
13:30
Scorecard

Bangladesh; 137/8 (20 overs)	v	Ireland; 138/4 (18.2 overs)
Mashrafe Mortaza 33* (16); Trent Johnston 3/20 (4 overs)		Niall O'Brien 40 (25); Mashrafe Mortaza 2/30 (4 overs)

Ireland won by 6 wickets
Trent Bridge, Nottingham
Umpires: Nigel Llong (Eng) and Simon Taufel (Aus)
Player of the match: Niall O'Brien (Ire)

- Ireland won the toss and elected to field.
- Bangladesh were eliminated as a result of this match.

=== West Indies 2010 ===
Squad

- Shakib Al Hasan (c)
- Mushfiqur Rahim (vc, wk)
- Tamim Iqbal
- Aftab Ahmed
- Imrul Kayes
- Jahurul Islam
- Mohammad Ashraful
- Mahmudullah
- Naeem Islam
- Mashrafe Mortaza
- Abdur Razzak
- Rubel Hossain
- Shafiul Islam
- Sohrawordi Shuvo
- Syed Rasel

Results

Group stage (Group A)			Super 8s		Semifinal	Final	Overall Result
Opposition Result	Opposition Result	Rank	Opposition Result	Rank	Opposition Result	Opposition Result	Overall Result
Pakistan; L by 21 runs	Australia; L by 27 runs	3	Did not advance				Group stage
Source: ESPNcricinfo

Scorecards

Group stage (Group A)

1 May
13:30
Scorecard

Pakistan; 172/3 (20 overs)	v	Bangladesh; 151/7 (20 overs)
Salman Butt 73 (46); Shakib Al Hasan 2/27 (4 overs)		Mohammad Ashraful 65 (49); Mohammad Sami 3/29 (4 overs)

Pakistan won by 21 runs
Beausejour Stadium, Gros Islet
Umpires: Asoka de Silva (SL) and Rod Tucker (Aus)
Player of the match: Salman Butt (Pak)

- Pakistan won the toss and elected to bat.

5 May
13:00
Scorecard

Australia; 141/7 (20 overs)	v	Bangladesh; 114 (18.4 overs)
Michael Hussey 47* (29); Shakib Al Hasan 2/24 (4 overs)		Shakib Al Hasan 28 (28); Dirk Nannes 4/18 (4 overs)

Australia won by 27 runs
Kensington Oval, Bridgetown
Umpires: Aleem Dar (Pak) and Billy Doctrove (WI)
Player of the match: Michael Hussey (Aus)

- Australia won the toss and elected to bat.

=== Sri Lanka 2012 ===
Squad

- Mushfiqur Rahim (c, wk)
- Mahmudullah (vc)
- Tamim Iqbal
- Mohammad Ashraful
- Jahurul Islam
- Junaid Siddique
- Shakib Al Hasan
- Nasir Hossain
- Farhad Reza
- Ziaur Rahman
- Abdur Razzak
- Elias Sunny
- Shafiul Islam
- Mashrafe Mortaza
- Abul Hasan

Results

Group stage (Group D)			Super 8s		Semifinal	Final	Overall Result
Opposition Result	Opposition Result	Rank	Opposition Result	Rank	Opposition Result	Opposition Result	Overall Result
New Zealand; L by 59 runs	Pakistan; L by 8 wickets	3	Did not advance				Group stage
Source: ESPNcricinfo

Scorecards

Group stage (Group D)

21 September
15:30 (D/N)
Scorecard

New Zealand; 191/3 (20 overs)	v	Bangladesh; 132/8 (20 overs)
Brendon McCullum 123 (58); Abdur Razzaq 2/28 (4 overs)		Nasir Hossain 50 (39); Tim Southee 3/16 (4 overs)

New Zealand won by 59 runs
Pallekele International Cricket Stadium, Pallekele
Umpires: Marais Erasmus (SA) and Nigel Llong (Eng)
Player of the match: Brendon McCullum (New Zealand)

- Bangladesh won the toss and elected to field

25 September
19:30 (D/N)
Scorecard

Bangladesh; 175/6 (20 overs)	v	Pakistan; 178/2 (18.4 overs)
Shakib Al Hasan 84 (54); Yasir Arafat 3/25 (3 overs)		Imran Nazir 72 (36); Abul Hasan 2/33 (3 overs)

Pakistan won by 8 wickets
Pallekele International Cricket Stadium, Pallekele
Umpires: Steve Davis (Aus) and Ian Gould (Eng)
Player of the match: Imran Nazir (Pakistan)

- Bangladesh won the toss and elected to bat
- Bangladesh were eliminated as a result of this match
- 175/6 was the highest first innings score for Bangladesh in the ICC T20 World Cup
- Shakib Al Hasan's 84 off 54 was the highest individual Twenty20 International score by a Bangladeshi player against Pakistan.

=== Bangladesh 2014 ===
Squad

- Mushfiqur Rahim (c, wk)
- Mahmudullah (vc)
- Tamim Iqbal
- Anamul Haque
- Shamsur Rahman
- Mominul Haque
- Nasir Hossain
- Shakib Al Hasan
- Sohag Gazi
- Farhad Reza
- Sabbir Rahman
- Mashrafe Mortaza
- Abdur Razzak
- Rubel Hossain
- Al-Amin Hossain

Results

First stage (Group A)				Super 10 (Group 2)					Semifinal	Final	Overall Result
Opposition Result	Opposition Result	Opposition Result	Rank	Opposition Result	Opposition Result	Opposition Result	Opposition Result	Rank	Opposition Result	Opposition Result	Overall Result
Afghanistan; W by 9 wickets	Nepal; W by 8 wickets	Hong Kong; L by 2 wickets	1	West Indies; L by 73 runs	India; L by 8 wickets	Pakistan; L by 50 runs	Australia; L by 7 wickets	5	Did not advance		Super 10
Source: ESPNcricinfo

Scorecards

First stage (Group A)

16 March
15:30
Scorecard

Afghanistan; 72 (17.1 overs)	v	Bangladesh; 78/1 (12 overs)
Gulbodin Naib 21 (22); Shakib Al Hasan 3/8 (3.1 overs)		Anamul Haque 44* (33); Samiullah Shenwari 1/14 (3 overs)

Bangladesh won by 9 wickets
Sher-e-Bangla National Cricket Stadium, Dhaka
Umpires: Nigel Llong (Eng) and Richard Illingworth (Eng)
Player of the match: Shakib Al Hasan (Ban)

- Bangladesh won the toss and elected to field.

18 March
19:30 (D/N)
Scorecard

Nepal; 126/5 (20 overs)	v	Bangladesh; 132/2 (15.3 overs)
Paras Khadka 41 (35); Al-Amin Hossain 2/17 (4 overs)		Anamul Haque 42 (33); Basanta Regmi 1/14 (3 overs)

Bangladesh won by 8 wickets
Zohur Ahmed Chowdhury Stadium, Chittagong
Umpires: Rod Tucker (Aus) and Aleem Dar (Pak)
Player of the match: Al-Amin Hossain (Ban)

- Bangladesh won the toss and elected to field.

20 March
19:30 (D/N)
Scorecard

Bangladesh; 108 (16.3 overs)	v	Hong Kong; 114/8 (19.4 overs)
Shakib Al Hasan 34 (27); Nadeem Ahmed 4/21 (3.3 overs)		Munir Dar 36 (27); Shakib Al Hasan 3/9 (4 overs)

Hong Kong won by 2 wickets
Zohur Ahmed Chowdhury Stadium, Chittagong
Umpires: Rod Tucker (Aus) and Paul Reiffel (Aus)
Player of the match: Nadeem Ahmed (HK)

- Hong Kong won the toss and elected to field.
- Bangladesh qualified for the Super 10 as a result of this match.

Super 10 (Group 2)

25 March
19:30 (D/N)
Scorecard

West Indies; 171/7 (20 overs)	v	Bangladesh; 98 (19.1 overs)
Dwayne Smith 72 (43); Al-Amin Hossain 3/21 (4 overs)		Mushfiqur Rahim 22 (22); Samuel Badree 4/15 (4 overs)

West Indies won by 73 runs
Sher-e-Bangla National Cricket Stadium, Dhaka
Umpires: Richard Kettleborough (Eng) and Nigel Llong (Eng)
Player of the match: Dwayne Smith (WI)

- Bangladesh won the toss and elected to field

28 March
19:30 (D/N)
Scorecard

Bangladesh; 138/7 (20 overs)	v	India; 141/2 (18.3 overs)
Anamul Haque 44(49); Amit Mishra 3/26 (4 overs)		Virat Kohli 57* (50); Mashrafe Mortaza 1/23 (4 overs)

India won by 8 wickets
Sher-e-Bangla National Cricket Stadium, Dhaka
Umpires: Kumar Dharmasena (SL) and Richard Kettleborough (Eng)
Player of the match: Ravichandran Ashwin (Ind)

- India won the toss and elected to field

30 March
15:30
Scorecard

Pakistan; 190/5 (20 overs)	v	Bangladesh; 140/7 (20 overs)
Ahmed Shehzad 111*(62); Abdur Razzak 2/20 (4 overs)		Shakib Al Hasan 38 (32); Umar Gul 3/30 (4 overs)

Pakistan won by 50 runs
Sher-e-Bangla National Cricket Stadium, Dhaka
Umpires: Ian Gould (Eng) and Richard Kettleborough (Eng)
Player of the match: Ahmed Shehzad (Pak)

- Pakistan won the toss and elected to bat
- Bangladesh were eliminated as a result of this match.

1 April
15:30
Scorecard

Bangladesh; 153/5 (20 overs)	v	Australia; 158/3 (17.3 overs)
Shakib Al Hasan 66 (52); Nathan Coulter-Nile 2/17 (3 overs)		Aaron Finch 71 (45); Al-Amin Hossain 2/30 (3.3 overs)

Australia won by 7 wickets
Sher-e-Bangla National Cricket Stadium, Dhaka
Umpires: Kumar Dharmasena (SL) and Marais Erasmus (RSA)
Player of the match: Aaron Finch (Aus)

- Bangladesh won the toss and elected to bat

=== India 2016 ===
Squad

- Mashrafe Mortaza (c)
- Tamim Iqbal
- Soumya Sarkar
- Sabbir Rahman
- Shakib Al Hasan
- Mahmudullah
- Mushfiqur Rahim (wk)
- Nasir Hossain
- Nurul Hasan
- Arafat Sunny
- Al-Amin Hossain
- Taskin Ahmed
- Mustafizur Rahman
- Abu Hider
- Shuvagata Hom

Results

First stage (Group A)				Super 10 (Group 2)					Semifinal	Final	Overall Result
Opposition Result	Opposition Result	Opposition Result	Rank	Opposition Result	Opposition Result	Opposition Result	Opposition Result	Rank	Opposition Result	Opposition Result	Overall Result
Netherlands; W by 8 runs	Ireland; No result	Oman; W by 54 runs (DLS)	1	Pakistan; L by 55 runs	Australia; L by 3 wickets	India; L by 1 run	New Zealand; L by 75 runs	5	Did not advance		Super 10
Source: ESPNcricinfo

Scorecards

First stage (Group A)

9 March
15:00 (D/N)
Scorecard

Bangladesh; 153/7 (20 overs)	v	Netherlands; 145/7 (20 overs)
Tamim Iqbal 83* (58); Timm van der Gugten 3/21 (4 overs)		Peter Borren 29 (28); Al-Amin Hossain 2/24 (3 overs)

Bangladesh won by 8 runs
Himachal Pradesh Cricket Association Stadium, Dharamshala
Umpires: Sundaram Ravi (Ind) and Rod Tucker (Aus)
Player of the match: Tamim Iqbal (Ban)

- Netherlands won the toss and elected to field.

11 March
19:30 (D/N)
Scorecard

Bangladesh; 94/2 (8 overs)	v	Ireland
Tamim Iqbal 47 (26); George Dockrell 1/18 (2 overs)

No result
Himachal Pradesh Cricket Association Stadium, Dharamshala
Umpires: Nigel Llong (Eng) and Rod Tucker (Aus)

- Ireland won the toss and elected to field.
- The match was reduced to 12 overs per side due to rain.
- Rain stopped play in Bangladesh's innings and no further play was possible.

13 March
19:30 (D/N)
Scorecard

Bangladesh; 180/2 (20 overs)	v	Oman; 65/9 (12 overs)
Tamim Iqbal 103* (63); Khawar Ali 1/24 (3 overs)		Jatinder Singh 25 (20); Shakib Al Hasan 4/15 (3 overs)

Bangladesh won by 54 runs (DLS method)
Himachal Pradesh Cricket Association Stadium, Dharamshala
Umpires: Chris Gaffaney (NZ) and Rod Tucker (Aus)
Player of the match: Tamim Iqbal (Ban)

- Oman won the toss and elected to field.
- Rain reduced Oman's innings to 12 overs with a target of 120 runs.
- Bangladesh qualified for the Super 10 stage of the tournament as a result of this match.
- Tamim Iqbal became the first player for Bangladesh and 18th overall to score a century in a T20I match. He also became the first player for Bangladesh and 25th overall to pass 1,000 runs in T20Is.

Super 10 (Group 2)

16 March
15:00 (D/N)
Scorecard

Pakistan; 201/5 (20 overs)	v	Bangladesh; 146/6 (20 overs)
Mohammad Hafeez 64 (42); Taskin Ahmed 2/32 (4 overs)		Shakib Al Hasan 50* (40); Shahid Afridi 2/27 (4 overs)

Pakistan won by 55 runs
Eden Gardens, Kolkata
Umpires: Ian Gould (Eng) and Richard Kettleborough (Eng)
Player of the match: Shahid Afridi (Pak)

- Pakistan won the toss and elected to bat.
- Shakib Al Hasan became the second player for Bangladesh to pass 1,000 runs in T20Is.
- Shakib Al Hasan also became the second all-rounder to score 1,000 runs and take 50 wickets in T20Is.

21 March
19:30 (D/N)
Scorecard

Bangladesh; 156/5 (20 overs)	v	Australia; 157/7 (18.3 overs)
Mahmudullah 49* (29); Adam Zampa 3/23 (4 overs)		Usman Khawaja 58 (45); Shakib Al Hasan 3/27 (4 overs)

Australia won by 3 wickets
M. Chinnaswamy Stadium, Bengaluru
Umpires: Ian Gould (Eng) and Richard Kettleborough (Eng)
Player of the match: Adam Zampa (Aus)

- Australia won the toss and elected to field.

23 March
19:30 (D/N)
Scorecard

India; 146/7 (20 overs)	v	Bangladesh; 145/9 (20 overs)
Suresh Raina 30 (23); Mustafizur Rahman 2/34 (4 overs)		Tamim Iqbal 35 (32); Ravichandran Ashwin 2/20 (4 overs)

India won by 1 run
M. Chinnaswamy Stadium, Bengaluru
Umpires: Aleem Dar (Pak) and Bruce Oxenford (Aus)
Player of the match: Ravichandran Ashwin (Ind)

- Bangladesh won the toss and elected to field.
- Bangladesh were eliminated as a result of this match.

26 March
15:00 (D/N)
Scorecard

New Zealand; 145/8 (20 overs)	v	Bangladesh; 70 (15.4 overs)
Kane Williamson 42 (32); Mustafizur Rahman 5/22 (4 overs)		Shuvagata Hom 16* (17); Grant Elliott 3/12 (4 overs)

New Zealand won by 75 runs
Eden Gardens, Kolkata
Umpires: Johan Cloete (SA) and Michael Gough (Eng)
Player of the match: Kane Williamson (NZ)

- New Zealand won the toss and elected to bat.
- Mustafizur Rahman became the second bowler for Bangladesh and 16th player overall to take a five-wicket haul in a T20I match.
- Bangladesh's total is their lowest total in a T20I match.
- Ten dismissals in this match were bowled, the most in a T20I match.

=== Oman & UAE 2021 ===
Squad and kit

- Mahmudullah (c)
- Litton Das (wk)
- Mohammad Naim
- Mushfiqur Rahim
- Nurul Hasan
- Afif Hossain
- Mahedi Hasan
- Nasum Ahmed
- Shakib Al Hasan
- Shamim Hossain
- Soumya Sarkar
- Mustafizur Rahman
- Rubel Hossain
- Shoriful Islam
- Taskin Ahmed

Home kit

Away kit

Results

First round (Group B)				Super 12 (Group 1)						Semifinal	Final	Overall Result
Opposition Result	Opposition Result	Opposition Result	Rank	Opposition Result	Opposition Result	Opposition Result	Opposition Result	Opposition Result	Rank	Opposition Result	Opposition Result	Overall Result
Scotland; L by 6 runs	Oman; W by 26 runs	Papua New Guinea; W by 84 runs	2	Sri Lanka; L by 5 wickets	England; L by 8 wickets	West Indies; L by 3 runs	South Africa; L by 6 wickets	Australia; L by 8 wickets	6	Did not advance		Super 12
Source: ESPNcricinfo

Scorecards

First stage (Group B)

17 October 2021
18:00 (N)
Scorecard

Scotland; 140/9 (20 overs)	v	Bangladesh; 134/7 (20 overs)
Chris Greaves 45 (28); Mahedi Hasan 3/19 (4 overs)		Mushfiqur Rahim 38 (36); Brad Wheal 3/24 (4 overs)

Scotland won by 6 runs
Oman Cricket Academy Ground Turf 1, Muscat
Umpires: Richard Kettleborough (Eng) and Ahsan Raza (Pak)
Player of the match: Chris Greaves (Sco)

- Bangladesh won the toss and elected to field.
- Shakib Al Hasan (Ban) became the leading wicket-taker in T20Is, taking his 108th dismissal.

19 October 2021
18:00 (N)
Scorecard

Bangladesh; 153 (20 overs)	v	Oman; 127/9 (20 overs)
Mohammad Naim 64 (50); Bilal Khan 3/18 (4 overs)		Jatinder Singh 40 (33); Mustafizur Rahman 4/36 (4 overs)

Bangladesh won by 26 runs
Oman Cricket Academy Ground Turf 1, Muscat
Umpires: Chris Gaffaney (NZ) and Ahsan Raza (Pak)
Player of the match: Shakib Al Hasan (Ban)

- Bangladesh won the toss and elected to bat.

21 October 2021
14:00
Scorecard

Bangladesh; 181/7 (20 overs)	v	Papua New Guinea; 97 (19.3 overs)
Mahmudullah 50 (28); Assad Vala 2/26 (3 overs)		Kiplin Doriga 46* (34); Shakib Al Hasan 4/9 (4 overs)

Bangladesh won by 84 runs
Oman Cricket Academy Ground Turf 1, Muscat
Umpires: Kumar Dharmasena (SL) and Richard Kettleborough (Eng)
Player of the match: Shakib Al Hasan (Ban)

- Bangladesh won the toss and elected to bat.
- This was the biggest winning margin for Bangladesh in T20Is, in terms of runs.
- Bangladesh qualified for the Super 12 stage of the tournament as a result of this match.

Super 12 (Group 1)

24 October 2021
14:00 (N)
Scorecard

Bangladesh; 171/4 (20 overs)	v	Sri Lanka; 172/5 (18.5 overs)
Mohammad Naim 62 (52); Chamika Karunaratne 1/12 (3 overs)		Charith Asalanka 80* (49); Shakib Al Hasan 2/17 (3 overs)

Sri Lanka won by 5 wickets
Sharjah Cricket Stadium, Sharjah
Umpires: Adrian Holdstock (SA) and Joel Wilson (WI)
Player of the match: Charith Asalanka (SL)

- Sri Lanka won the toss and elected to field.
- Shakib Al Hasan (Ban) became the leading wicket-taker in men's T20 World Cup matches, with his 40th dismissal.

27 October 2021
14:00
Scorecard

Bangladesh; 124/9 (20 overs)	v	England; 126/2 (14.1 overs)
Mushfiqur Rahim 29 (30); Tymal Mills 3/27 (4 overs)		Jason Roy 61 (38); Nasum Ahmed 1/26 (3 overs)

England won by 8 wickets
Sheikh Zayed Cricket Stadium, Abu Dhabi
Umpires: Nitin Menon (Ind) and Langton Rusere (Zim)
Player of the match: Jason Roy (Eng)

- Bangladesh won the toss and elected to bat.

29 October 2021
14:00
Scorecard

West Indies; 142/7 (20 overs)	v	Bangladesh; 139/5 (20 overs)
Nicholas Pooran 40 (22); Shoriful Islam 2/20 (4 overs)		Litton Das 44 (43); Jason Holder 1/22 (4 overs)

West Indies won by 3 runs
Sharjah Cricket Stadium, Sharjah
Umpires: Adrian Holdstock (SA) and Rod Tucker (Aus)
Player of the match: Nicholas Pooran (WI)

- Bangladesh won the toss and elected to field.

2 November 2021
14:00
Scorecard

Bangladesh; 84 (18.2 overs)	v	South Africa; 86/4 (13.3 overs)
Mahedi Hasan 27 (25); Anrich Nortje 3/8 (3.2 overs)		Temba Bavuma 31* (28); Taskin Ahmed 2/18 (4 overs)

South Africa won by 6 wickets
Sheikh Zayed Cricket Stadium, Abu Dhabi
Umpires: Richard Illingworth (Eng) and Paul Reiffel (Aus)
Player of the match: Kagiso Rabada (SA)

- South Africa won the toss and elected to field.
- Bangladesh were eliminated as a result of this match.

4 November 2021
14:00
Scorecard

Bangladesh; 73 (15 overs)	v	Australia; 78/2 (6.2 overs)
Shamim Hossain 19 (18); Adam Zampa 5/19 (4 overs)		Aaron Finch 40 (20); Shoriful Islam 1/9 (1 over)

Australia won by 8 wickets
Dubai International Cricket Stadium, Dubai
Umpires: Kumar Dharmasena (SL) and Nitin Menon (Ind)
Player of the match: Adam Zampa (Aus)

- Australia won the toss and elected to field.
- Adam Zampa (Aus) took his first five-wicket haul in T20Is.

=== Australia 2022 ===
Squad and kit

- Shakib Al Hasan (c)
- Litton Das (wk)
- Najmul Hossain Shanto
- Nurul Hasan
- Yasir Ali
- Afif Hossain
- Mehidy Hasan Miraz
- Mosaddek Hossain
- Nasum Ahmed
- Soumya Sarkar
- Ebadot Hossain
- Hasan Mahmud
- Mustafizur Rahman
- Shoriful Islam
- Taskin Ahmed

Home kit

Away kit

Results

First round		Super 12 (Group 2)						Semifinal	Final	Overall Result
Opposition Result	Rank	Opposition Result	Opposition Result	Opposition Result	Opposition Result	Opposition Result	Rank	Opposition Result	Opposition Result	Overall Result
Advanced to next stage directly		Netherlands; W by 9 runs	South Africa; L by 104 runs	Zimbabwe; W by 3 runs	India; L by 5 runs (DLS)	Pakistan; L by 5 wickets	5	Did not advance		Super 12
Source: ESPNcricinfo

Scorecards

Super 12 (Group 2)

24 October 2022
15:00
Scorecard

Bangladesh; 144/8 (20 overs)	v	Netherlands; 135 (20 overs)
Afif Hossain 38 (27); Paul van Meekeren 2/21 (4 overs)		Colin Ackermann 62 (48); Taskin Ahmed 4/25 (4 overs)

Bangladesh won by 9 runs
Bellerive Oval, Hobart
Umpires: Chris Gaffaney (NZ) and Nitin Menon (Ind)
Player of the match: Taskin Ahmed (Ban)

- Netherlands won the toss and elected to field.

27 October 2022
14:00
Scorecard

South Africa; 205/5 (20 overs)	v	Bangladesh; 101 (16.3 overs)
Rilee Rossouw 109 (56); Shakib Al Hasan 2/33 (3 overs)		Litton Das 34 (31); Anrich Nortje 4/10 (3.3 overs)

South Africa won by 104 runs
Sydney Cricket Ground, Sydney
Umpires: Langton Rusere (Zim) and Rod Tucker (Aus)
Player of the match: Rilee Rossouw (SA)

- South Africa won the toss and elected to bat.

30 October 2022
13:00
Scorecard

Bangladesh; 150/7 (20 overs)	v	Zimbabwe; 147/8 (20 overs)
Najmul Hossain Shanto 71 (55); Blessing Muzarabani 2/13 (2 overs)		Sean Williams 64 (42); Taskin Ahmed 3/19 (4 overs)

Bangladesh won by 3 runs
The Gabba, Brisbane
Umpires: Marais Erasmus (SA) and Nitin Menon (Ind)
Player of the match: Taskin Ahmed (Ban)

- Bangladesh won the toss and elected to bat.

2 November 2022
18:30 (N)
Scorecard

India; 184/6 (20 overs)	v	Bangladesh; 145/6 (16 overs)
Virat Kohli 64* (44); Hasan Mahmud 3/47 (4 overs)		Litton Das 60 (27); Hardik Pandya 2/28 (3 overs)

India won by 5 runs (DLS method)
Adelaide Oval, Adelaide
Umpires: Chris Brown (NZ) and Marais Erasmus (SA)
Player of the match: Virat Kohli (Ind)

- Bangladesh won the toss and elected to field.
- Bangladesh were set a revised target of 151 runs in 16 overs due to rain.

---

6 November 2022
14:30
Scorecard

Bangladesh; 127/8 (20 overs)	v	Pakistan; 128/5 (18.1 overs)
Najmul Hossain Shanto 54 (48); Shaheen Afridi 4/22 (4 overs)		Mohammad Rizwan 32 (32); Nasum Ahmed 1/14 (4 overs)

Pakistan won by 5 wickets
Adelaide Oval, Adelaide
Umpires: Adrian Holdstock (SA) and Joel Wilson (WI)
Player of the match: Shaheen Afridi (Pak)

- Bangladesh won the toss and elected to bat.
- Afif Hossain (Ban) scored his 1,000th run in T20Is.

=== United States & West Indies 2024 ===
Squad and kit

- Najmul Hossain Shanto (c)
- Taskin Ahmed (vc)
- Litton Das (wk)
- Soumya Sarkar
- Tanzid Hasan
- Shakib Al Hasan
- Towhid Hridoy
- Mahmudullah
- Jaker Ali
- Mahedi Hasan
- Rishad Hossain
- Mustafizur Rahman
- Shoriful Islam
- Tanvir Islam
- Tanzim Hasan Sakib

2024 kit

Results

Group stage (Group D)					Super 8				Semifinal	Final	Overall Result
Opposition Result	Opposition Result	Opposition Result	Opposition Result	Rank	Opposition Result	Opposition Result	Opposition Result	Rank	Opposition Result	Opposition Result	Overall Result
Sri Lanka; W by 2 wickets	South Africa; L by 4 runs	Netherlands; W by 25 runs	Nepal; W by 21 runs	2	Australia; L by 28 runs (DLS)	India; L by 50 runs	Afghanistan; L by 8 runs (DLS)	4	Did not advance		Super 8
Source: ESPNcricinfo

Scorecards

Group stage (Group D)

7 June 2024
19:30 UTC−5 (N)
Scorecard

Sri Lanka; 124/9 (20 overs)	v	Bangladesh; 125/8 (19 overs)
Pathum Nissanka 47 (28); Mustafizur Rahman 3/17 (4 overs)		Towhid Hridoy 40 (20); Nuwan Thushara 4/18 (4 overs)

Bangladesh won by 2 wickets
Grand Prairie Stadium, Dallas
Umpires: Michael Gough (Eng) and Paul Reiffel (Aus)
Player of the match: Rishad Hossain (Ban)

- Bangladesh won the toss and elected to field.
- This was Bangladesh's first win against Sri Lanka in T20 World Cup.

10 June 2024
10:30 UTC−4
Scorecard

South Africa; 113/6 (20 overs)	v	Bangladesh; 109/7 (20 overs)
Heinrich Klaasen 46 (44); Tanzim Hasan Sakib 3/18 (4 overs)		Towhid Hridoy 37 (34); Keshav Maharaj 3/27 (4 overs)

South Africa won by 4 runs
Nassau County International Cricket Stadium, East Meadow
Umpires: Richard Illingworth (Eng) and Sam Nogajski (Aus)
Player of the match: Heinrich Klaasen (SA)

- South Africa won the toss and elected to bat.

13 June 2024
10:30 UTC−4
Scorecard

Bangladesh; 159/5 (20 overs)	v	Netherlands; 134/8 (20 overs)
Shakib Al Hasan 64* (46); Paul van Meekeren 2/15 (4 overs)		Sybrand Engelbrecht 33 (22); Rishad Hossain 3/33 (4 overs)

Bangladesh won by 25 runs
Arnos Vale Stadium, Kingstown
Umpires: Chris Brown (NZ) and Jayaraman Madanagopal (Ind)
Player of the match: Shakib Al Hasan (Ban)

- Netherlands won the toss and elected to field.

16 June 2024
19:30 UTC−4 (N)
Scorecard

Bangladesh; 106 (19.3 overs)	v	Nepal; 85 (19.2 overs)
Shakib Al Hasan 17 (22); Sompal Kami 2/10 (3 overs)		Kushal Malla 27 (40); Tanzim Hasan Sakib 4/7 (4 overs)

Bangladesh won by 21 runs
Arnos Vale Stadium, Kingstown
Umpires: Sam Nogajski (Aus) and Ahsan Raza (Pak)
Player of the match: Tanzim Hasan Sakib (Ban)

- Nepal won the toss and elected to field.
- Bangladesh qualified for the Super 8 as a result of this match.

Super 8 (Group 1)

20 June 2024
20:30 UTC−4 (N)
Scorecard

Bangladesh; 140/8 (20 overs)	v	Australia; 100/2 (11.2 overs)
Najmul Hossain Shanto 41 (36); Pat Cummins 3/29 (4 overs)		David Warner 53* (35); Rishad Hossain 2/23 (3 overs)

Australia won by 28 runs (DLS method)
Sir Vivian Richards Stadium, North Sound
Umpires: Michael Gough (Eng) and Richard Illingworth (Eng)
Player of the match: Pat Cummins (Aus)

- Australia won the toss and elected to field.
- Rain prevented any further play.

22 June 2024
10:30 UTC−4
Scorecard

India; 196/5 (20 overs)	v	Bangladesh; 146/8 (20 overs)
Hardik Pandya 50* (27); Tanzim Hasan Sakib 2/32 (4 overs)		Najmul Hossain Shanto 40 (32); Kuldeep Yadav 3/19 (4 overs)

India won by 50 runs
Sir Vivian Richards Stadium, North Sound
Umpires: Michael Gough (Eng) and Adrian Holdstock (SA)
Player of the match: Hardik Pandya (Ind)

- Bangladesh won the toss and elected to field.
- Shakib Al Hasan (Ban) became the first bowler to take 50 wickets in T20 World Cup history.

24 June 2024
20:30 UTC−4 (N)
Scorecard

Afghanistan; 115/5 (20 overs)	v	Bangladesh; 105 (17.5 overs)
Rahmanullah Gurbaz 43 (55); Rishad Hossain 3/26 (4 overs)		Litton Das 54* (49); Rashid Khan 4/23 (4 overs)

Afghanistan won by 8 runs (DLS method)
Arnos Vale Stadium, Kingstown
Umpires: Nitin Menon (Ind) and Langton Rusere (Zim)
Player of the match: Naveen-ul-Haq (Afg)

- Afghanistan won the toss and elected to bat.
- Bangladesh were set a revised target of 114 runs off 19 overs due to rain.

== Records and statistics ==
=== Team records ===
Highest innings totals

Score	Opponent	Venue	Season
181/7 (20 overs)	Papua New Guinea	Al Amerat	2021
180/2 (20 overs)	Oman	Dharamsala	2016
175/6 (20 overs)	Pakistan	Kandy	2012
171/4 (20 overs)	Sri Lanka	Sharjah	2021
165/4 (18 overs)	West Indies	Johannesburg	2007
Last updated: 24 June 2024

=== Batting statistics ===
Most runs

Runs	Player	Mat	Inn	HS	Avg	100s	50s	Period
853	Shakib Al Hasan	43	43	84	23.05	—N/a	4	2007–2024
514	Tamim Iqbal	23	23	103*	24.47	1	1	2007–2016
458	Mahmudullah	37	33	50	17.61	—N/a	1	2007–2024
402	Mushfiqur Rahim	33	28	57*	17.47	—N/a	1	2007–2021
399	Litton Das	20	20	60	21.00	—N/a	2	2021–2024
Last updated: 24 June 2024

Highest partnerships

Runs	Players	Opposition	Venue	Season
112 (3rd wicket)	Shakib Al Hasan (56) & Mushfiqur Rahman (47)	v Australia	Dhaka	2014
109 (3rd wicket)	Mohammad Ashraful (61) & Aftab Ahmed (41)	v West Indies	Johannesburg	2007
97 (2nd wicket)	Tamim Iqbal (52) & Sabbir Rahman (44)	v Oman	Dharamsala	2016
91 (3rd wicket)	Shakib Al Hasan (43) & Mohammad Ashraful (47)	v Pakistan	Gros Islet	2010
80 (3rd wicket)	Shakib Al Hasan (42) & Mohammad Naim (35)	v Oman	Al Amerat	2021
Last updated: 24 June 2024

=== Bowling statistics ===
Most wickets

Wickets	Player	Matches	Avg.	Econ.	BBI	4W	5W	Period
50	Shakib Al Hasan	43	20.12	6.86	4/9	3	0	2007–2024
28	Mustafizur Rahman	22	20.07	6.85	5/22	1	1	2016–2024
26	Taskin Ahmed	22	19.03	6.58	4/25	1	0	2014–2014
18	Al-Amin Hossain	14	19.00	7.86	3/21	0	0	2014–2016
16	Abdur Razzak	15	22.87	6.81	2/16	0	0	2007–2014
Last updated: 24 June 2024
