= Bangladeshi cricket team in the West Indies in 2014 =

Bangladesh cricket team in West Indies in 2014
	Bangladesh	West Indies
- Dates: 20 August 2014 – 17 September 2014
Captains	Mushfiqur Rahim	Dwayne Bravo (ODI); Darren Sammy (T20I); Denesh Ramdin (Test)

Test series
- Result: West Indies won the 2-match series 2–0
Most runs	Mushfiqur Rahim (179)	Kraigg Brathwaite (324)
Most wickets	Taijul Islam (8)	Sulieman Benn (14)
- Player of the series: Kraigg Brathwaite (WI)

One Day International series
- Results: West Indies won the 3-match series 3–0
Most runs	Tamim Iqbal (118)	Denesh Ramdin (277)
Most wickets	Al-Amin Hossain (10)	Ravi Rampaul (7)
- Player of the series: Denesh Ramdin (WI)

Twenty20 International series
- Results: 1-match series drawn 0–0

The Bangladesh national cricket team toured the West Indies from August to September 2014 for a tour consisting of two Test matches, three Limited Overs International (LOI) matches and one Twenty20 International. In the previous tour by Bangladesh of the West Indies in 2009, Bangladesh "whitewashed" a weakened West Indies cricket team in both the Test and LOI series.

== Squads ==
On 24 August 2014, the West Indies Cricket Board's Selection Panel named the 14-man squad for the 3rd and final Dhaka Bank ODI against Bangladesh and also added all-rounder Andre Russell to their squad for the third and final One-Day International against Bangladesh in St. Kitts. Leon Johnson was added to the West Indies team for the second and final test match due to Chris Gayle's pull-out citing personal reasons.

Tests		ODIs		T20I	
West Indies	Bangladesh	West Indies	Bangladesh	West Indies	Bangladesh
Denesh Ramdin (C) (wk); Chris Gayle; Kraigg Brathwaite; Kirk Edwards; Darren Bravo; Shivnarine Chanderpaul; Jermaine Blackwood; Kemar Roach; Jerome Taylor; Jason Holder; Shannon Gabriel; Sulieman Benn; Shane Shillingford; Leon Johnson	Mushfiqur Rahim (C) (wk); Al-Amin Hossain; Anamul Haque; Imrul Kayes; Mahmudullah; Mohammad Mithun (wk); Mominul Haque; Nasir Hossain; Rubel Hossain; Robiul Islam; Shafiul Islam; Shamsur Rahman; Shuvagata Hom; Tamim Iqbal; Taijul Islam	Dwayne Bravo (C); Darren Bravo; Kirk Edwards; Chris Gayle; Jason Holder; Nikita Miller; Sunil Narine; Kieron Pollard; Denesh Ramdin (wk); Ravi Rampaul; Kemar Roach; Darren Sammy; Lendl Simmons	Mushfiqur Rahim (C) (wk); Abdur Razzak; Al-Amin Hossain; Anamul Haque; Imrul Kayes; Mahmudullah; Mashrafe Mortaza; Mithun Ali; Mominul Haque; Nasir Hossain; Rubel Hossain; Shamsur Rahman; Sohag Gazi; Tamim Iqbal; Taskin Ahmed	Darren Sammy (C); Sulieman Benn; Christopher Barnwell; Dwayne Bravo; Sheldon Cottrell; Andre Fletcher (wk); Chris Gayle; Sunil Narine; Kieron Pollard; Denesh Ramdin (wk); Andre Russell; Krishmar Santokie; Lendl Simmons; Dwayne Smith	Mushfiqur Rahim (C) (wk); Abdur Razzak; Al-Amin Hossain; Anamul Haque; Imrul Kayes; Mahmudullah; Mashrafe Mortaza; Mithun Ali; Mominul Haque; Nasir Hossain; Rubel Hossain; Shamsur Rahman; Sohag Gazi; Taijul Islam; Tamim Iqbal; Taskin Ahmed

== Tour matches ==
=== One Day: Grenada vs Bangladeshis ===
17 August 2014
Scorecard

(Bangladesh) Bangladeshis; 322/6 (50 overs)	v	Grenada; 227/9 (50 overs)
Tamim Iqbal 91 (86); Josh Thomas 2/54 (8 overs)		Keone George 62 (89); Mashrafe Mortaza 3/44 (8 overs)

Bangladeshis won by 95 runs
Progress Park, St Andrew's, Grenada
Umpires: M Fraser and Anderson Matherson

- Bangladeshis won the toss and elected to bat first
- Players in each team: 15 (11 batting, 11 fielding)

=== Three Day: Saint Kitts & Nevis v Bangladeshis ===
30 August 2014
Scorecard

(Bangladesh) Bangladeshis	v	Saint Kitts and Nevis
377/7 (103.3 Overs); Mushfiqur Rahim 106* (170); Quinton Boatswain 2/47 (22 Overs)		399 (127 Overs); Shivnarine Chanderpaul 183 (315); Rubel Hossain 3/90 (25 Overs)
148/4 (36 overs); Shamsur Rahman 46* (63); Shaquille Martina 1/45 (10 Overs)

Match drawn
Warner Park, Basseterre, St. Kitts
Umpires: Nigel Duguid (GUY) & Peter Nero (T&T)

- Bangladeshis won the toss and chose to bat
- Players per side 13 (11 batting, 11 fielding)

== ODI series ==
=== 1st ODI ===
20 August 2014
Scorecard

Bangladesh; 217/9 (50 overs)	v	West Indies; 219/7 (39.4 overs)
Anamul Haque 109 (138); Dwayne Bravo 4/32 (7 overs)		Kieron Pollard 89 (70); Al-Amin Hossain 4/51 (8.4 overs)

West Indies won by 3 wickets.
National Cricket Stadium, St. George's, Grenada
Umpires: Richard Kettleborough (Eng) and Joel Wilson (WI)
Player of the match: Kieron Pollard (WI)

- West Indies won the toss and elected to field.

=== 2nd ODI ===
22 August 2014
Scorecard

West Indies; 247/7 (50 overs)	v	Bangladesh; 70 (24.4 overs)
Chris Gayle 58 (67); Mashrafe Mortaza 3/39 (10 overs)		Tamim Iqbal 37 (50); Sunil Narine 3/13 (7 overs)

West Indies won by 177 runs
National Cricket Stadium, St. George's, Grenada
Umpires: Aleem Dar (Pak) and Gregory Brathwaite (WI)
Player of the match: Sunil Narine (WI)

- Bangladesh won the toss and elected to field.

=== 3rd ODI ===
25 August 2014 (D/N)
Scorecard

West Indies; 338/7 (50 overs)	v	Bangladesh; 247/8 (50 overs)
Denesh Ramdin 169 (121); Al-Amin Hossain 4/59 (10 overs)		Mushfiqur Rahim 72 (113); Ravi Rampaul 4/29 (10 overs)

West Indies won by 91 runs
Warner Park, Basseterre, Saint Kitts
Umpires: Richard Kettleborough (Eng) & Joel Wilson (WI)
Player of the match: Denesh Ramdin (WI)

- West Indies won the toss and chose to bat
- Abdur Razzak played his last ODI for Bangladesh

== T20I series ==
=== Only T20I ===
27 August 2014
Scorecard

Bangladesh; 31/0 (4.4 overs)	v	West Indies
Anamul Haque 19*

No result
Warner Park, Basseterre, Saint Kitts
Umpires: Peter Nero (WI) & Joel Wilson (WI)

- Bangladesh won the toss and chose to bat.
- Heavy rain during Bangladesh's innings lead to game being declared a no result.

== Test series ==
=== 1st Test ===
5–9 September 2014
Scorecard

West Indies	v	Bangladesh
484/7d (160 overs); Kraigg Brathwaite 212 (447); Taijul Islam 5/135 (47 overs)		182 (71.4 overs); Mominul Haque 51 (112); Sulieman Benn 5/39 (24.4 overs)
13/0 (2.4 overs); Chris Gayle 9* (10); Taijul Islam 0/4 (1 over)		314 (113.3 overs) (f/o); Mushfiqur Rahim 116 (243); Kemar Roach 4/64 (22 overs)

West Indies won by 10 wickets
Arnos Vale Ground, Kingstown, Saint Vincent
Umpires: Marais Erasmus (SA) and Richard Illingworth (Eng)
Player of the match: Kraigg Brathwaite (WI)

- Bangladesh won the toss and elected to field.
- Overnight rain meant no play was possible before Lunch on Day 2.
- Shuvagata Hom and Taijul Islam (Both Bangladesh) made their Test debuts

=== 2nd Test ===
13–17 September 2014
Scorecard

West Indies	v	Bangladesh
380 (124 overs); Shivnarine Chanderpaul 84* (198); Al-Amin Hossain 3/80 (31 overs)		161 (62.3 overs); Mahmudullah 53 (100); Kemar Roach 5/42 (20 overs)
269/4d (77 overs); Shivnarine Chanderpaul 101* (134); Mahmudullah 2/64 (16 overs)		192 (77.4 overs); Tamim Iqbal 64 (181); Sulieman Benn 5/72 (32 overs)

West Indies won by 296 runs
Beausejour Stadium, Gros Islet, St Lucia
Umpires: Steve Davis (Aus) & Richard Illingworth (Eng)
Player of the match: Shivnarine Chanderpaul (WI)

- Bangladesh won the toss and elected to field.
- Leon Johnson (WI) made his test debut.
- This was the 500th test match for West Indies cricket team.

== Broadcasters ==
Area	TV broadcaster(s)
Pakistan	Ten Sports Neo Cricket Star Cricket and Ten HD
Bangladesh	BTV and Gazi Television
India	Ten Cricket
Sri Lanka	MTV
Australia	Foxsports
South Africa	Super Sports
UAE	Ten Sports
