= 2013–14 Victory Day T20 Cup =

Twenty20 Cricket League

- Dates: 22 December – 31 December 2013
- Administrator: Bangladesh Cricket Board
- Cricket format: Twenty20
- Tournament format: Double Round-robin
- Host: Bangladesh
- Champions: Prime Bank
- Runners-up: UCB BCB XI
- Participants: 4
- Matches: 13
- Player of the series: Anamul Haque
- Most runs: Anamul Haque (298)
- Most wickets: Al-Amin Hossain (13)

The 2013–14 Victory Day T20 Cup was a Twenty20 cricket competition that was held in Bangladesh. It was played by four teams, during December 2013. Four Dhaka Premier League teams took part in a lottery to determine who picked one each of the Yellow, Blue, Green and Red teams. Announcing the schedule of the tournament at a press conference on 21 December, the Bangladesh Cricket Board (BCB) confirmed that four teams would participate in the T20 series and AMBER Group would be the title sponsors of the event.

Nasir Hossain was given a leave from the tournament to attend his brother's wedding. Abdur Razzak also missed out due to personal commitment while Shamsur Rahman did not recover sufficiently from an ankle injury. They were replaced by Sharifullah and Naeem Islam.

In the final match, Prime Bank defeated UCB BCB XI by 55 runs to win the title. Rubel Hossain of Prime Bank Cricket Club won the player of the final award for his cheap economic rate of 4.75. Anamul Haque was the leading run scorer in the tournament with 298 runs while the leading wicket-taker was Al-Amin Hossain with 13 wickets including a five-for.

== Background ==
BCB originally organised the tournament as the preparation and the criteria for selecting players for the 2014 ICC World Twenty20, scheduled to be played in early 2014. The league was competed as an alternative to the 2014 season of Bangladesh Premier League, which was not able to be held following the match fixing scandal. BCB's President Nazmul Hassan Papon said, "We have World Twenty20 ahead, for which the cricketers need to practise. We needed an alternative tournament since we are not able to hold BPL. This is why we took the challenge and arranged the tournament on short notice and we have achieved it,"

The four contested teams were earlier named Red, Green, Yellow and Blue, which had been sold to four different parties. A lottery was held to determine the owners of the team in which Dhaka Mohammedan got Mashrafe Mortaza's side, Mushfiqur Rahim's team went to Dhaka Abahani and Prime Bank got the team led by Shakib Al Hasan. In the absence of a fourth interested party, the BCB itself took up the role and took the Tamim Iqbal's team. Soon after however, the BCB received confirmation of United Commercial Bank's interest in taking over the fourth team.

Each of the four teams has three Grade A players, while the remaining members of the squad are of Grade B. The Grade A players will receive 250,000 taka as the tournament fee, while the fees for Grade B has been fixed at 150,000 taka.

== Team ==
In December 2013, BCB confirmed that the following four teams would take part.

- Dhaka Abahani
- Dhaka Mohammedan
- Prime Bank
- UCB BCB XI

== Squads ==
The followings were the squads of the four teams. Each team consisted of 14 players.

Abahani	Mohammedan	Prime Bank	UCB BCB XI
Mushfiqur Rahim (c); Aftab Ahmed; Farhad Reza; Mahmudullah; Mehedi Maruf; Mizanur Rahman; Nabil Samad; Naeem Islam Jnr; Nafees Iqbal; Nazmul Hossain Milon; Suhrawadi Shuvo; Soumya Sarkar; Subashis Roy; Ziaur Rahman	Mashrafe Mortaza (c); Alauddin Babu; Dewan Sabbir; Elias Sunny; Jahurul Islam; Junaid Siddique; Mominul Haque; Nurul Hasan; Raqibul Hasan; Sajidul Islam; Saqlain Sajib; Sharifullah; Taibur Rahman	Shakib Al Hasan (c); Alok Kapali; Anamul Haque; Liton Das; Mehrab Hossain; Mohammad Sharif; Robiul Islam; Rubel Hossain; Sabbir Rahman; Shahadat Hossain; Shykat Ali; Sohag Gazi; Taijul Islam; Tapash Baisya	Tamim Iqbal (c); Abdul Mazid; Al-Amin Hossain; Arafat Sunny; Delwar Hossain; Enamul Haque; Imrul Kayes; Jubair Ahmed; Marshall Ayub; Mohammad Mithun; Mohammad Shahid; Muktar Ali; Naeem Islam; Rony Talukdar

== Venues ==
The following were the venues of the matches played at this tournament.

Bangladesh

Sylhet	Dhaka
Sylhet International Cricket Stadium	Sher-e-Bangla National Cricket Stadium
Capacity: 18,500	Capacity: 26,000
Sylhet International Cricket Stadium	Sher-e-Bangla National Cricket Stadium
Matches: 8	Matches: 5 (incl. Final)

== Points table ==
Pos	Team	Pld	W	L	NR	Pts	NRR
1	Prime Bank	8	7	1	0	14	+1.157
2	UCB BCB XI	8	4	4	0	8	+0.014
3	Mohammedan	8	2	6	0	4	–0.459
4	Abahani	8	2	6	0	4	–0.459
Source: ESPNcricinfo

- advanced to the Final

== Tournament summary ==
=== Day 1 ===
The opening match of the tournament began at 13:00 on 22 December at the Sylhet International Cricket Stadium in Sylhet, between Abahani Limited and UCB BCB XI. Abahani Limited batted first and lost their first wicket to the eighth ball of the tournament, resulting it to a score of 139/8, with Aftab Ahmed top-scoring with 33 runs. Abahani Limited could not sustain a partnership with wickets falling regularly throughout the innings. Delwar Hossain picked up 4 wickets as Abahani Limited were restricted to 139 for 8. UCB BCB XI successfully chased the target of 140 after a thriller last over requiring 11 runs, with wicket-keeper Mohammad Mithun top-scoring with 67 runs off just 44 balls. In the second match, Prime Bank batted first and could secure only 126 runs for 7 wickets, though they sustained partnership with high-scoring run rate in the early overs. Elias Sunny's economic 3 wicket haul and two wickets collapse from Alauddin Babu's bowling helped to restrict Prime Bank to 126. In reply, Mohammedan reached the target comfortably with an over remaining as Jaurul Islam struck unbeaten 65 runs off 52 balls.

=== Day 2 ===
In the third match, relying on Mushfiqur Rahim's 59 runs from 38 balls and Ziaur Rahman's speedy 24 runs off just 11 balls, Abahani Limited's innings stopped to 172 for 8. The Abahani Limited bowlers combined well to bowl out Mohammedan for just 95 runs in 14.2 overs. Subashis Roy, Farhad Reza, Nabil Samad and Suhrawadi Shuvo took two wickets each. The next match of the tournament saw a big margin of victory by wickets, when Prime Bank Cricket Club chased down the target of 124 losing only 3 wickets in 17.2 overs. Sabbir Rahman's half-century off 41 balls and Shahadat Hossain's three-wicket haul including the prized scalp of Tamim Iqbal gave Prime Bank a 7-wicket victory.

=== Day 3 ===
The third day began with Abahani Limited having early batting collapse to fall to 29/2 in their innings against the Prime Bank. Captain Mushfiqur Rahim's second successive fifty in the tournament helped Abahani Limited recover before their innings ended to 172 for 8. In response, Sabbir Rahman blasted an unbeaten 84 to guide Prime Bank to a four-wicket win over Abahani Limited. The next match was played between UCB BCB XI and Mohammedan Sporting Club, where Mohammedan completed their second victory in the series after beating UCB BCB XI by 7 wickets. Dewan Sabbir's economic four-wicket haul and Mominul Haque's smashing half-ton starred for the winners.

=== Day 4 ===
In the following match, UCB BCB XI fought back in a thrilling way by winning over Abahani at a margin of 2 wickets after two consecutive loses in the tournament. Al-Amin Hossain's five wickets in the last over inspired UCB BCB XI to their win, making Al-Amin the first bowler to do so. In the same match, he also made a record for being the first Bangladeshi bowler to take a hat-trick in T20 to his name. The day's second match was full of individual performances and milestones too. Anamul Haque scored a fiery maiden T20 hundred, which helped Prime Bank post 204 for 3 in their 20 overs. Mohammedan, in reply, were bowled out for 45, making it the third largest margin of lose by runs at that time, with Shakib Al Hasan taking six wickets.

=== Day 5 ===
Nurul Hasan's unbeaten 79 helped Mohammedan to an eight-wicket win over Abahani in the next match as Mohammedan strengthened their position with a third win. The second match of the day also resulted a high aggregate match, in which UCB BCB XI won by five wickets against Prime Bank. Imrul Kayes's hammering 82 and Mohammad Mithun's 44 helped UCB BCB XI to comeback in the match after losing two wickets in the 4th and 26th ball of the innings respectively.

=== Day 6 ===
In the first match of the following day, Prime Bank defeated Abahani by 16 runs as Anamul Haque's bat shone again, scoring 69 runs off 43 balls. While chasing the target of 175, Abahani could not up the run rate for chasing that big total, although they sustained a partnership of the sixth wicket. In the following Tamim Iqbal's blistering 130 off just 64 balls guided UCB BCB XI to post 217 for 4 in their 20 overs. UCB BCB XI's victory confirmed their qualification to the final. Though Mohammedan started well with a view to chasing 217, with Jahurul Islam's smashing 80 off just 39 balls, the continuous batting collapse of the middle order after Jahurul's wicket resulted in UCB BCB XI's 29 runs win.

=== Day 7 ===
The final match of the tournament was played between Prime Bank and UCB BCB XI on 31 December 2013. Prime Bank Cricket Club were crowned the champions of the Victory Day T20 Cup. Prime Bank marched to the Victory Day T20 Cup title on the back of a brisk half-century from Liton Das, but Rubel Hossain produced the key contribution with a wicket and two vital, brilliant catches as they beat UCB-BCB XI by 55 runs in front of a decent crowd in Mirpur. Liton Das smashed 62 runs off 39 balls, while Rubel Hossain bagged the vital wicket of Rony Talukdar conceding just 19 runs from 4 overs.

== Pool matches ==
=== 1st T20 ===
22 December
13:00
Scorecard

Abahani; 139/8	v	UCB BCB XI; 140/4
Aftab Ahmed 33 (26)		Mohammad Mithun 67* (44); Delwar Hossain 4/18 (4 overs)

UCB BCB XI won by 6 wickets
Sylhet International Cricket Stadium, Sylhet
Umpires: Gazi Sohel and Tanvir Ahmed
Player of the match: Mohammad Mithun (UCB BCB XI)

- UCB BCB XI won the toss and elected to field.

=== 2nd T20 ===
22 December 2013
17:00 (D/N)
Scorecard

Prime Bank; 126/7	v	Mohammedan; 130/5
Anamul Haque 35 (27); Elias Sunny 3/26 (4 overs)		Jahurul Islam 65* (52); Sohag Gazi 1/12 (3 overs)

Mohammedan Sporting Club won by 5 wickets
Sylhet International Cricket Stadium, Sylhet
Umpires: Gazi Sohel and Masudur Rahman
Player of the match: Jahurul Islam (Mohammedan Sporting Club)

- Mohammedan won the toss and elected to field.

=== 3rd T20 ===
23 December 2013
13:00
Scorecard

Abahani; 172/8	v	Mohammedan; 95
Mushfiqur Rahim 59 (38); Mashrafe Mortaza 2/17 (4 overs)		Shahriar Nafees 34 (27); Farhad Reza 2/9 (2 overs)

Abahani Limited won by 77 runs
Sylhet International Cricket Stadium, Sylhet
Umpires: Masudur Rahman and Tanvir Ahmed
Player of the match: Mushfiqur Rahim (Abahani Limited)

- Mohammedan won the toss and elected to field.

=== 4th T20 ===
23 December 2013
17:00 (D/N)
Scorecard

UCB BCB XI; 123/8	v	Prime Bank; 124/3
Marshall Ayub 40 (30); Shahadat Hossain 3/20 (4 overs)		Sabbir Rahman 50* (41); Delwar Hossain 2/27 (3 overs)

Prime Bank Cricket Club won by 7 wickets
Sylhet International Cricket Stadium, Sylhet
Umpires: Gazi Sohel and Masudur Rahman
Player of the match: Sabbir Rahman (Prime Bank Cricket Club)

- Prime Bank won the toss and elected to field.

=== 5th T20 ===
25 December 2013
13:00
Scorecard

Abahani; 171/7	v	Prime Bank; 175/6
Mushfiqur Rahim 50 (33); Shahadat Hossain 3/17 (4 overs)		Sabbir Rahman 84* (50); Suhrawadi Shuvo 1/15 (2 overs)

Prime Bank Cricket Club won by 4 wickets
Sylhet International Cricket Stadium, Sylhet
Umpires: Gazi Sohel and Masudur Rahman
Player of the match: Sabbir Rahman (Prime Bank Cricket Club)

- Prime Bank won the toss and elected to field.

=== 6th T20 ===
25 December 2013
17:00 (D/N)
Scorecard

UCB BCB XI; 129/9	v	Mohammedan; 130/3
Rony Talukdar 43 (32); Dewan Sabbir 4/22 (4 overs)		Mominul Haque 50* (28); Enamul Haque

Mohammedan Sporting Club won by 7 wickets
Sylhet International Cricket Stadium, Sylhet
Umpires: Gazi Sohel and Tanvir Ahmed
Player of the match: Dewan Sabbir (Mohammedan Sporting Club)

- UCB BCB XI won the toss and elected to bat.
- Taibur Rahman (Mohammedan Sporting Club) made his T20 debut.

=== 7th T20 ===
26 December 2013
13:00
Scorecard

Abahani; 143	v	UCB BCB XI; 146/8
Soumya Sarkar 55 (50); 5/17 (4 overs)		Tamim Iqbal 61 (52); Subashis Roy 4/27 (4 overs)

UCB BCB XI won by 2 wickets
Sylhet International Cricket Stadium, Sylhet
Umpires: Masudur Rahman and Tanvir Ahmed
Player of the match: Al-Amin Hossain

- UCB BCB XI won the toss and elected to field.
- Al-Amin Hossain took a hat-trick.
- Al-Amin Hossain became the first bowler to take five wickets in an over and the second bowler to pick up four wickets in four balls in Twenty20 cricket.

=== 8th T20 ===
26 December 2013
17:00 (D/N)
Scorecard

Prime Bank; 204/3	v	Mohammedan; 45
Anamul Haque 105 (63); Mashrafe Mortaza 2/34 (4 overs)		Raqibul Hasan 13 (14); Shakib Al Hasan 6/18 (4 overs)

Prime Bank Cricket Clubwon by 159 runs
Sylhet International Cricket Stadium, Sylhet
Umpires: Masudur Rahman and Tanvir Ahmed
Player of the match: Anamul Haque (Prime Bank Cricket Club)

- Mohammedan won the toss and elected to field.

=== 9th T20 ===
28 December 2013
13:00
Scorecard

Abahani; 171/6	v	Mohammedan; 172/2
Soumya Sarkar 52 (34); Dewan Sabbir 3/41 (4 overs)		Nurul Hasan 79* (47); Soumya Sarkar 1/19 (2 overs)

Mohammedan Sporting Club won by 8 wickets
Sher-e-Bangla National Cricket Stadium, Mirpur
Umpires: Anisur Rahman and Mahfuzur Rahman
Player of the match: Nurul Hasan (Mohammedan Sporting Club)

- Mohammedan won the toss and elected to field.

=== 10th T20 ===
28 December 2013
17:00
Scorecard

Prime Bank; 173/8	v	UCB BCB XI; 175/5
Sabbir Rahman 57 (45); Al-Amin Hossain 3/45 (4 overs)		Imrul Kayes 82* (54); Shakib Al Hasan 2/28 (4 overs)

UCB BCB XI won by 5 wickets
Sher-e-Bangla National Cricket Stadium, Mirpur
Umpires: Anisur Rahman and Morshed Ali Khan
Player of the match: Imrul Kayes (UCB BCB XI)

- UCB BCB XI won the toss and elected to field.

=== 11th T20 ===
29 December 2013
13:00
Scorecard

Prime Bank; 175/6	v	Abahani; 159/5
Anamul Haque 69 (43); Mahmudullah 2/20 (4 overs)		Nazmul Hossain Milon 46* (38); Sabbir Rahman 1/3 (1 over)

Prime Bank Cricket Club won by 16 runs
Sher-e-Bangla National Cricket Stadium, Mirpur
Umpires: Masudur Rahman and Sharfuddoula
Player of the match: Anamul Haque (Prime Bank Cricket Club)

- Abahani won the toss and elected to field.

=== 12th T20 ===
29 December 2013
17:00 (D/N)
Scorecard

UCB BCB XI; 217/4	v	Mohammedan; 188
Tamim Iqbal 130 (64); Sharifullah 1/27 (4 overs)		Jahurul Islam 80 (34); Mohammad Shahid 2/31 (3.4 overs)

UCB BCB XI won by 29 runs
Sher-e-Bangla National Cricket Stadium, Mirpur
Umpires: Enamul Haque and Sharfuddoula
Player of the match: Tamim Iqbal

- Mohammedan won the toss and elected to field.
- Tamim Iqbal scored his maiden T20 century.

== Final ==
31 December 2013
13:00
Scorecard

Prime Bank; 174/6	v	UCB BCB XI; 119/8
Liton Das 62 (39); Al-Amin Hossain 3/31 (4 overs)		Rony Talukdar 32 (24); Taijul Islam 2/21 (4 overs)

Prime Bank Cricket Club won by 55 runs
Sher-e-Bangla National Cricket Stadium, Mirpur
Umpires: Enamul Haque and Sharfuddoula
Player of the match: Rubel Hossain

- Prime Bank won the toss and elected to bat.

== Statistics ==
=== Most runs ===
Player	Team	Mat	Inns	Runs	Ave	SR	HS	100	50	4s	6s
Anamul Haque	Prime Bank	7	7	298	42.58	141.90	105	1	1	24	13
Tamim Iqbal	UCB BCB XI	7	7	275	39.28	126.14	98*	0	4	51	15
Sabbir Rahman	Prime Bank	7	7	268	53.60	133.33	84*	0	3	24	7
Soumya Sarkar	Abahani	6	6	179	29.83	116.23	55	0	2	13	9
Jahurul Islam	Mohammedan	6	6	178	35.60	158.92	80	0	2	20	8
Source: ESPN Cricinfo, last updated on 24 April 2021

=== Most wickets ===
Player	Team	Mat	Inns	Over	Mdns	Runs	Wkts	BBI	Ave	Econ	SR	4WI	5WI
Al-Amin Hossain	UCB BCB XI	7	7	25.0	1	192	13	5/17	14.76	7.68	11.50	0	1
Shakib Al Hasan	Prime Bank	6	6	22.4	1	145	11	6/18	13.18	6.39	12.30	0	1
Taijul Islam	Prime Bank	7	7	25.0	1	164	11	2/21	14.90	6.56	13.60	0	0
Dewan Sabbir	Mohammedan	5	5	20.0	0	185	11	4/22	16.81	9.25	10.90	1	0
Subashis Roy	Abahani	6	6	23.0	0	204	10	4/27	20.40	8.86	13.80	1	0
Source: ESPNcricinfo, last updated on 24 April 2021

=== Highest team totals ===
Team	Total	Opponent	Ground	Result
UCB BCB XI	217/4	Mohammedan	Mirpur	Won
Prime Bank	204/3	Mohammedan	Sylhet	Won
Mohammedan	188	UCB BCB XI	Mirpur	Lost
Source: ESPN Cricinfo

== Broadcasting ==
On 24 December 2013, Bangladesh Cricket Board (BCB) confirmed deals for telecasting the matches of the tournament and broadcasting rights by an e-mail endorsement.

Location	Television broadcaster(s)
Bangladesh	Cable/satellite Bangladesh Television
