= Zimbabwean cricket team in Bangladesh in 2014–15 =

International cricket tour

	Bangladesh	Zimbabwe
- Dates: 26 October – 1 December 2014
Captains	Mashrafe Mortaza (ODI); Mushfiqur Rahim (Tests)	Elton Chigumbura (ODI); Brendan Taylor (Tests)

Test series
- Result: Bangladesh won the 3-match series 3–0
Most runs	Mominul Haque (321)	Hamilton Masakadza (356)
Most wickets	Shakib Al Hasan (18)	Tinashe Panyangara (14)
- Player of the series: Shakib Al Hasan (Ban)

One Day International series
- Results: Bangladesh won the 5-match series 5–0
Most runs	Mushfiqur Rahim (213)	Brendan Taylor (162)
Most wickets	Shakib Al Hasan (11)	Tinashe Panyangara (9)
- Player of the series: Mushfiqur Rahim (Ban)

The Zimbabwe cricket team toured Bangladesh from 26 October to 1 December 2014. The tour consisted of three Test matches and five One Day International matches. Bangladesh won the Test series 3–0 and the ODI series 5–0.

== Squads ==
Tests		ODIs	
Bangladesh	Zimbabwe	Bangladesh	Zimbabwe
Mushfiqur Rahim (c, wk); Tamim Iqbal; Shakib Al Hasan; Shamsur Rahman; Mominul Haque; Rubel Hossain; Shuvagata Hom; Mahmudullah; Shafiul Islam; Jubair Hossain; Shahadat Hossain; Marshall Ayub; Al-Amin Hossain; Taijul Islam; Anamul Haque; Imrul Kayes	Brendan Taylor (c, wk); Regis Chakabva; Brian Chari; Tendai Chatara; Elton Chigumbura; Craig Ervine; Tafadzwa Kamungozi; Hamilton Masakadza; Shingi Masakadza; Wellington Masakadza; Natsai M'shangwe; Richmond Mutumbami; John Nyumbu; Tinashe Panyangara; Sikandar Raza; Vusi Sibanda; Malcolm Waller	Mashrafe Mortaza (c); Shakib Al Hasan (VC); Anamul Haque; Mominul Haque; Al-Amin Hossain; Rubel Hossain; Jubair Hossain; Tamim Iqbal; Imrul Kayes; Mushfiqur Rahim (wk); Sabbir Rahman; Arafat Sunny; Mahmudullah	Elton Chigumbura (c); Brendan Taylor (wk); Regis Chakabva; Sikandar Raza; Tendai Chatara; Craig Ervine; Tafadzwa Kamungozi; Hamilton Masakadza; Natsai M'shangwe; Richmond Mutumbami; John Nyumbu; Tinashe Panyangara; Vusi Sibanda; Malcolm Waller; Neville Madziva; Timycen Maruma; Solomon Mire; Peter Moore; Tawanda Mupariwa; Brian Vitori

== Tour matches ==
=== 3-Day Warm Up: Bangladesh Cricket Board XI vs Zimbabweans ===
20–22 October 2014
Scorecard

(Zimbabwe) Zimbabweans	v	Bangladesh Cricket Board XI
241 (76.2 overs); Sikandar Raza 44 (72); Mehedi Hasan 2/22 (7 overs)		297 (102.5 overs); Shuvagata Hom 75* (176); Natsai M'shangwe 4/109 (31 overs)
201/5 (50 overs); Craig Ervine 85* (98); Dewan Sabbir 2/17 (6 overs)

Match drawn
Fatullah Osmani Stadium, Fatullah
Umpires: Sharfuddoula & Anisur Rahman (Ban)

- Zimbabweans won the toss & elected to bat
- Players per side 14 (11 batting, 11 fielding)

=== Practice Match: Bangladesh Cricket Board XI vs Zimbabweans ===
19 November 2014
Scorecard

Bangladesh Cricket Board XI; 281 (50)	v	(Zimbabwe) Zimbabweans; 194 (45.3 overs)
Nasir Hossain 61 (62); Vusi Sibanda 4/44 (7 overs)		Timycen Maruma 50 (79); Sabbir Rahman 2/23 (6 overs)

BCBXI won by 88 runs
Zahur Ahmed Chowdhury Stadium, Chittagong
Umpires: Anisur Rahman & Sharfuddoula (Ban)

- Zimbabweans won the toss and chose to field
- Players per side 13 (11 batting, 11 fielding)

== Test series ==
=== 1st Test ===
25–29 October 2014
Scorecard

Zimbabwe	v	Bangladesh
240 (75.5 overs); Sikandar Raza 51 (122); Shakib Al Hasan 6/59 (24.5 overs)		254 (98 overs); Mushfiqur Rahim 64 (126); Tinashe Panyangara 5/59 (23 overs)
114 (35.5 overs); Brendan Taylor 45* (60); Taijul Islam 8/39 (16.5 overs)		101/7 (33.3 overs); Mahmudullah 28 (50); Elton Chigumbura 4/21 (10.3 overs)

Bangladesh won by 3 wickets
Shere Bangla National Stadium, Mirpur
Umpires: Kumar Dharmasena (SL) and Sundaram Ravi (Ind)
Player of the match: Taijul Islam

- Zimbabwe won the toss and chose to bat.
- Jubair Hossain (Bangladesh) and Tafadzwa Kamungozi (Zimbabwe) made their Test debuts.

=== 2nd Test ===
3–7 November 2014
Scorecard

Bangladesh	v	Zimbabwe
433 (158.5 overs); Shakib Al Hasan 137 (180); Tinashe Panyangara 2/49 (29 overs)		368 (135.1 overs); Hamilton Masakadza 158 (326); Shakib Al Hasan 5/80 (41 overs)
248/9d (83.5 overs); Mahmudullah 71 (158); Malcolm Waller 4/59 (27 overs)		151 (51.1 overs); Hamilton Masakadza 61 (113); Shakib Al Hasan 5/44 (18 overs)

Bangladesh won by 162 runs
Sheikh Abu Naser Stadium, Khulna
Umpires: Aleem Dar (Pak) and Billy Bowden (NZ)
Player of the match: Shakib Al Hasan (Ban)

- Bangladesh won the toss and chose to bat
- Brian Chari and Natsai M'shangwe (both Zimbabwe) made their Test debuts.
- Shakib Al Hasan is only the third player in Test history after Ian Botham (1980) and Imran Khan (1983) to score a hundred and take 10 wickets in the same match.

=== 3rd Test ===
12–16 November 2014
Scorecard

Bangladesh	v	Zimbabwe
503 (153.4 overs); Imrul Kayes 130 (257); Sikandar Raza 3/123 (36 overs)		374 (106 overs); Elton Chigumbura 88 (130); Jubair Hossain 5/96 (20 overs)
319/5d (78 overs); Mominul Haque 131* (189); Tinashe Panyangara 2/31 (12 overs)		262 (85 overs); Regis Chakabva 89* (181); Rubel Hossain 2/16 (4 overs)

Bangladesh won by 186 runs
Zahur Ahmed Chowdhury Stadium, Chittagong
Umpires: Aleem Dar (Pak) and Chris Gaffaney (NZ)
Player of the match: Mominul Haque

- Bangladesh won the toss and elected to bat.
- Bangladesh achieved their 1st ever 3-0 Test-series whitewash.

== ODI series ==
=== 1st ODI ===
21 November 2014
Scorecard

Bangladesh; 281/7 (50 overs)	v	Zimbabwe; 194 (42.1 overs)
Shakib Al Hasan 101 (99); Tinashe Panyangara 3/66 (10 overs)		Brendan Taylor 54 (72); Shakib Al Hasan 4/41 (10 overs)

Bangladesh won by 87 runs
Zahur Ahmed Chowdhury Stadium, Chittagong
Umpires: Chris Gaffaney (NZ) and Sharfuddoula (Ban)
Player of the match: Shakib Al Hasan (Ban)

- Zimbabwe won the toss and elected to field.
- Sabbir Rahman (Ban) and Solomon Mire (Zim) both made their ODI debuts.

=== 2nd ODI ===
23 November 2014
12:30 PM (D/N)
Scorecard

Bangladesh; 251/7 (50 overs)	v	Zimbabwe; 183 (44.5 overs)
Anamul Haque 80 (110); Tafadzwa Kamungozi 2/38 (10 overs)		Solomon Mire 50 (79); Arafat Sunny 4/29 (9.5 overs)

Bangladesh won by 68 runs
Zahur Ahmed Chowdhury Stadium, Chittagong
Umpires: Chris Gaffaney (NZ) and Sharfuddoula (Ban)
Player of the match: Mashrafe Mortaza (Ban)

- Bangladesh won the toss and elected to bat.

=== 3rd ODI ===
26 November 2014 (D/N)
Scorecard

Bangladesh; 297/6 (50 overs)	v	Zimbabwe; 173 (39.5 overs)
Anamul Haque 95 (120); Tinashe Panyangara 2/54 (10 overs)		Elton Chigumbura 53* (46); Arafat Sunny 4/27 (8.5 overs)

Bangladesh won by 124 runs
Shere Bangla National Stadium, Mirpur
Umpires: Anisur Rahman (Ban) and Chris Gaffaney (NZ)
Player of the match: Anamul Haque (Ban)

- Zimbabwe won the toss and elected to field.
- Peter Moor (Zim) made his ODI debut.

=== 4th ODI ===
28 November 2014
Scorecard

Bangladesh; 256/8 (50 overs)	v	Zimbabwe; 235/8 (50 overs)
Mahmudullah 82* (112); Solomon Mire 3/49 (10 overs)		Brendan Taylor 63 (69); Shakib Al Hasan 2/28 (10 overs)

Bangladesh won by 21 runs
Shere Bangla National Stadium, Mirpur
Umpires: Anisur Rahman (Ban) and Chris Gaffaney (NZ)
Player of the match: Mahmudullah (Ban)

- Bangladesh won the toss and elected to bat.
- Jubair Hossain (Ban) made his ODI debut.

=== 5th ODI ===
1 December 2014
Scorecard

Zimbabwe; 128 (30 overs)	v	Bangladesh; 130/5 (24.3 overs)
Hamilton Masakadza 52 (54); Taijul Islam 4/11 (7 overs)		Mahmudullah 51* (55); Tendai Chatara 3/44 (10 overs)

Bangladesh won by 5 wickets
Shere Bangla National Stadium, Mirpur
Umpires: Chris Gaffaney (NZ) and Sharfuddoula (Ban)
Player of the match: Taijul Islam (Ban)

- Zimbabwe won the toss and elected to bat.
- Soumya Sarkar and Taijul Islam (both Ban) made their ODI debuts.
- Taijul Islam became the first bowler in ODI history to claim a hat-trick on debut.
