= 2013–14 Bangladeshi cricket season =

The 2013–14 season in Bangladesh was the fourteenth season in which first-class cricket was played at the domestic level. The main domestic competitions were the National Cricket League (NCL), the Bangladesh Cricket League (BCL) and the Dhaka Premier League. The Bangladesh Premier League (BPL) was cancelled. Internationally, there were tours by New Zealand and Sri Lanka, and Bangladesh hosted both the 2014 Asia Cup and 2014 ICC World Twenty20 tournaments. The season was disrupted by civil and political disturbances caused by issues arising from the 2014 Bangladeshi general election.

== International tournaments ==
=== 2014 Asia Cup ===
Bangladesh hosted the Asia Cup for the second consecutive time from February 24 to March 7, 2014. The tournament featured Afghanistan, Bangladesh, India, Pakistan and Sri Lanka. However, it was an extremely disappointing tournament for the Tigers, as they lost to Afghanistan, Pakistan, Sri Lanka and India, failing to win a single match.

=== 2014 ICC World Twenty20 ===
Bangladesh hosted the men's and women's World Twenty20 from March 15 to April 7, 2014, in Dhaka, Chittagong and Sylhet.

== International tours ==
=== New Zealand in Bangladesh ===
The New Zealand cricket team toured Bangladesh in October and November 2013. The tour consisted of two Test matches, three One Day Internationals and one Twenty20 International. The matches were to be played in Chittagong and Mirpur. Both Test matches ended in draws, Bangladesh won all three One Day Internationals and New Zealand won the sole Twenty20 International.

=== Sri Lanka in Bangladesh ===
Sri Lanka toured Bangladesh in January and February 2014 playing two Test Matches, three One Day Internationals and two Twenty20 Internationals. Sri Lanka won every match, with the exception of the second Test match which ended in a draw.

== Domestic competitions ==
Initially it was planned that the NCL would be held in November and December 2013, the BCL in May and June 2014 and the BPL in December and January. This plan was severely disrupted by the protests, strikes and blockades surrounding the 2014 Bangladeshi general election. Some tournaments were rescheduled as a result. The 2013–14 BPL was, in the end, cancelled but that was because all six franchises had been suspended by the governing committee for violating tournament regulations and the tournament's third edition was held in 2014–15 with six new franchises.

=== National Cricket League ===
The National Cricket League (NCL) was initially scheduled to take place in November and December 2013. It was later rescheduled to take place from January to April 2014 with a break for the World Twenty20.

Team	Pld	W	L	T	D	A	BP	Pts
Dhaka Division	7	5	1	0	1	0	49	132
Rajshahi Division	7	4	0	0	3	0	38	111
Rangpur Division	7	3	1	0	3	0	35	92
Khulna Division	7	2	1	0	4	0	40	84
Sylhet Division	7	2	4	0	1	0	35	70
Chittagong Division	7	2	3	0	2	0	26	64
Dhaka Metropolis	7	1	4	0	2	0	38	60
Barisal Division	7	0	5	0	2	0	25	31

=== Victory Day T20 Cup ===
The 2013–14 Victory Day T20 Cup was a Twenty20 cricket competition that was held in Bangladesh. It was played by four Dhaka Premier League teams, from 22 December to 31 December 2014. BCB originally organised the tournament as the preparation and the criteria for selecting players for the 2014 ICC World Twenty20, scheduled to be played in early 2014. Prime Bank Cricket Club was crowned the champions of the tournament.

Pos	Team	Pld	W	L	NR	Pts	NRR
1	Prime Bank	8	7	1	0	14	+1.157
2	UCB BCB XI	8	4	4	0	8	+0.014
3	Dhaka Mohammedan	8	2	6	0	4	–0.459
4	Dhaka Abahani	8	2	6	0	4	–0.459
Source: ESPNcricinfo

- advanced to the Final

=== Bangladesh Cricket League ===
The Bangladesh Cricket League (BCL) was initially scheduled for May and June 2014 but, in view of the national disturbances, it was contested in two parts. The first two rounds of the tournament were brought forward to January to fill a gap left by disruption to the NCL. There was then a break to let the leading players prepare for the Test series against Sri Lanka. The remaining rounds of the tournament were scheduled to take place in May after the 2014 ICC World Twenty20. South Zone defeated North Zone in the final.

Team	Pld	W	L	T	D	AB	BP	Pts
Central Zone	2	1	0	0	1	0	12	31
North Zone	2	1	0	0	1	0	11	30
South Zone	2	0	1	0	1	0	14	17
East Zone	2	0	1	0	1	0	12	15

==== Results ====
12–15 January 2014
Scorecard

Central Zone	v	East Zone
475 (92.4 overs); Shamsur Rahman 267* (286); Mashrafe Mortaza 3/98 (14 overs)		303 (91.4 overs); Liton Das 79 (152); Mahmudullah Riyad 4/67 (23 overs)
61/1 (62 overs); Nazimuddin 97 (155); Arafat Sunny 1/41 (13 overs)

Match Drawn
Bangladesh Krira Shikkha Protisthan No 2 Ground, Savar
Player of the match: Shamsur Rahman (Central Zone)

12–15 January 2014
Scorecard

North Zone	v	South Zone
421 (107.5 overs); Farhad Reza 153 (153); Robiul Islam 3/44 (15 overs)		427/8 dec (104 overs); Imrul Kayes 127 (104 overs); Taijul Islam 4/97 (25 overs)
341/7 (70 overs); Naeem Islam 106 (127); Taibur Rahman 2/27 (4 overs)

Match Drawn
Bangladesh Krira Shikkha Protisthan No 3 Ground, Savar

18–21 January 2014
Scorecard

Central Zone	v	South Zone

Central Zone won by 37 runs
Bangladesh Krira Shikkha Protisthan No 3 Ground, Savar

18–21 January 2014
Scorecard

East Zone	v	North Zone

North Zone won by 7 wickets
Bangladesh Krira Shikkha Protisthan No 2 Ground, Savar

2–5 May 2014

Central Zone	v	North Zone

Khan Shaheb Osman Ali Stadium, Fatullah

2–5 May 2014

East Zone	v	South Zone

Fatullah Outer Ground, Fatullah

Final

8–12 May 2014

North Zone	v	South Zone

South Zone won by 213 runs

=== Dhaka Premier League ===
Two editions of the List A Dhaka Premier League were scheduled. The first edition, held from September to November 2013, was initially scheduled for the 2012–13 season but was rescheduled due to the unavailability of players from the Bangladesh national team. The title was won by Gazi Tank Cricketers. The second edition of the league, that for the 2013–14 season itself, was cancelled by the BCB and was set to resume in 2014–15.

== Women's matches ==
=== Pakistan women in Bangladesh ===
1st ODI

4 March
Scorecard

Bangladesh; 152 (49.3 overs)	v	Pakistan; 109 (44.1 overs)

Bangladesh won by 43 runs
Cox's Bazar Cricket Stadium, Cox's Bazar

2nd ODI

6 March
Scorecard

Bangladesh; 88/7 (34.5 overs)	v	Pakistan; 87 (46.1 overs)

Bangladesh won by 3 wickets
Cox's Bazar Cricket Stadium, Cox's Bazar

1st T20I

8 March
Scorecard

Bangladesh; 113/6 (20 overs)	v	Pakistan; 126/4 (20 overs)

Pakistan won by 13 runs
Cox's Bazar Cricket Stadium, Cox's Bazar

2nd T20I

15 March
12:30
Scorecard

Bangladesh; 86/8 (20 overs)	v	Pakistan; 120/7 (20 overs)

Pakistan won by 34 runs
Cox's Bazar Cricket Stadium, Cox's Bazar

=== India women in Bangladesh ===
1st T20I

9 March
Scorecard

Bangladesh; 85 (20 overs)	v	India; 101/1 (20 overs)

India won by 16 runs
Cox's Bazar Cricket Stadium, Cox's Bazar

2nd T20I

11 March
Scorecard

Bangladesh; 65/9 (20 overs)	v	India; 66/2 (12.3 overs)

India won by 8 wickets
Cox's Bazar Cricket Stadium, Cox's Bazar

3rd T20I

13 March
Scorecard

Bangladesh; 81/8 (20 overs)	v	India; 82/3 (16.4 overs)

India won by 7 wickets
Cox's Bazar Cricket Stadium, Cox's Bazar
