= West Indian cricket team in Bangladesh in 2012–13 =

West Indian cricket team in Bangladesh in 2012
	Bangladesh	West Indies
- Dates: 9 November 2012 – 11 December 2012
Captains	Mushfiqur Rahim	Darren Sammy

Test series
- Result: West Indies won the 2-match series 2–0
Most runs	Nasir Hossain (263)	Shivnarine Chanderpaul (354)
Most wickets	Sohag Gazi (12)	Tino Best (12)
- Player of the series: Shivnarine Chanderpaul (West Indies)

One Day International series
- Results: Bangladesh won the 5-match series 3–2
Most runs	Mushfiqur Rahim (204)	Marlon Samuels (170)
Most wickets	Abdur Razzak (10)	Sunil Narine (9)
- Player of the series: Mushfiqur Rahim (Bangladesh)

Twenty20 International series
- Results: West Indies won the 1-match series 1–0
Most runs	Tamim Iqbal (88)	Marlon Samuels (85)
Most wickets	Rubel Hossain (2)	Kemar Roach (1)
- Player of the series: Marlon Samuels (West Indies)

The West Indies cricket team toured Bangladesh in November and December 2012. The tour consisted of one Twenty20 (T20), two Test matches and five One Day Internationals (ODIs). In the First Test in Dhaka, West Indian batsman Chris Gayle became the first player to hit a six off the first ball in a Test match. The second Test of the series became the inaugural Test match to be played at the Sheikh Abu Naser Stadium, Khulna.

== Venues ==
All matches were played at the following three grounds:

Dhaka	West Indian cricket team in Bangladesh in 2012–13 is located in Bangladesh
Sher-e-Bangla Cricket Stadium	West Indian cricket team in Bangladesh in 2012–13 is located in Bangladesh
Capacity: 26,000	West Indian cricket team in Bangladesh in 2012–13 is located in Bangladesh
Khulna	West Indian cricket team in Bangladesh in 2012–13 is located in Bangladesh
Sheikh Abu Naser Stadium	West Indian cricket team in Bangladesh in 2012–13 is located in Bangladesh
Capacity: 15,000	West Indian cricket team in Bangladesh in 2012–13 is located in Bangladesh
Savar	West Indian cricket team in Bangladesh in 2012–13 is located in Bangladesh
Bangladesh Krira Shikkha Protisthan Ground	West Indian cricket team in Bangladesh in 2012–13 is located in Bangladesh
Capacity:	West Indian cricket team in Bangladesh in 2012–13 is located in Bangladesh

== Tour matches ==
=== 2-Day Match: Bangladesh Cricket Board XI v West Indians ===
9–10 November
Scorecard

Bangladesh Cricket Board XI	v	West Indians

Match Abandoned
Bangladesh Krira Shikkha Protisthan Ground, Savar

=== List A: Bangladesh Cricket Board XI v West Indians ===
28 November
09:00
Scorecard

Bangladesh Cricket Board XI; 243 (49.1 overs)	v	West Indians; 361/7 (50 overs)
Imrul Kayes 43 (54); Sunil Narine 3/47 (10 overs)		Lendl Simmons 84 (81); Elias Sunny 3/71 (10 overs)

West Indians won by 118 runs
Sheikh Abu Naser Stadium, Khulna
Umpires: Enamul Haque (Ban) and Masudur Rahman (Ban)

- West Indians won the toss and elected to bat

== Test series ==
=== 1st Test ===
13–17 November
Scorecard

West Indies	v	Bangladesh
527/4d (144 overs); Shivnarine Chanderpaul 203* (372); Sohag Gazi 3/145 (47 overs)		556 (148.3 overs); Naeem Islam 108 (255); Ravi Rampaul 3/118 (32 overs)
273 (74.2 overs); Kieran Powell 110 (197); Sohag Gazi 6/74 (23.2 overs)		167 (54.3 overs); Mahmudullah 29 (50); Tino Best 5/24 (12.3 overs)

West Indies won by 77 runs
Sher-e-Bangla Cricket Stadium, Dhaka
Umpires: Bruce Oxenford (Aus) and Richard Illingworth (Eng)
Player of the match: Kieran Powell (WI)

- West Indies won the toss and elected to bat
- Test debuts: Sohag Gazi (Bangladesh) and Veerasammy Permaul (West Indies)

=== 2nd Test ===
21–25 November
Scorecard

Bangladesh	v	West Indies
387 (91.1 overs); Abul Hasan 113 (123); Fidel Edwards 6/90 (18.1 overs)		648/9 dec (200.3 overs); Marlon Samuels 260 (455); Shakib Al Hasan 4/151 (52 overs)
287 (70.1 overs); Shakib Al Hasan 97 (117); Tino Best 6/40 (12.1 overs)		30/0 (4.4 overs); Chris Gayle 20* (16)

West Indies won by 10 wickets
Sheikh Abu Naser Stadium, Khulna
Umpires: Richard Illingworth (ENG) and Bruce Oxenford (AUS)
Player of the match: Marlon Samuels (WI)

- Bangladesh won the toss and elected to bat
- Test debut: Abul Hasan (Bangladesh)

== ODI series ==
=== 1st ODI ===
30 November
Scorecard

Bangladesh; 201/3 (40.2 overs)	v	West Indies; 199 (46.5 overs)
Tamim Iqbal 58 (51); Andre Russell 1/28 (7 overs)		Sunil Narine 36 (45); Sohag Gazi 4/29 (9.5 overs)

Bangladesh won by 7 wickets
Sheikh Abu Naser Stadium, Khulna
Umpires: Enamul Haque (Ban) and Ranmore Martinesz (Sri)
Player of the match: Sohag Gazi (Ban)

- West Indies won the toss and elected to bat
- ODI debuts: Abul Hasan, Anamul Haque, Mominul Haque and Sohag Gazi (Bangladesh)

=== 2nd ODI ===
2 December
Scorecard

Bangladesh; 292/6 (50 overs)	v	West Indies; 132 (31.1 overs)
Anamul Haque 120 (145); Ravi Rampaul 5/49 (10 overs)		Darren Bravo 28 (41); Abdur Razzak 3/19 (5 overs)

Bangladesh won by 160 runs
Sheikh Abu Naser Stadium, Khulna
Umpires: Enamul Haque (Ban) and Ranmore Martinesz (Sri)
Player of the match: Anamul Haque (Ban)

- West Indies won the toss and elected to field

=== 3rd ODI ===
5 December
14:30 (D/N)
Scorecard

Bangladesh; 227 (49.1 overs)	v	West Indies; 228/6 (47 overs)
Mahmudullah 52 (70); Sunil Narine 4/37 (10 overs)		Marlon Samuels 126 (149); Abdur Razzak 2/34 (10 overs)

West Indies won by 4 wickets
Sher-e-Bangla Cricket Stadium, Dhaka
Umpires: Enamul Haque (Ban) and Ranmore Martinesz (Sri)
Player of the match: Marlon Samuels (WI)

- West Indies won the toss and elected to field
- ODI debuts: Veerasammy Permaul (West Indies)

=== 4th ODI ===
7 December
14:30 (D/N)
Scorecard

Bangladesh; 136 (34.1 overs)	v	West Indies; 211/9 (50 overs)
Mahmudullah 56* (78); Darren Sammy 3/28 (8 overs)		Darren Sammy 60* (62); Mahmudullah 3/46 (10 overs)

West Indies won by 75 runs
Sher-e-Bangla Cricket Stadium, Dhaka
Umpires: Enamul Haque (Ban) and Ranmore Martinesz (Sri)
Player of the match: Darren Sammy (WI)

- Bangladesh won the toss and elected to field

=== 5th ODI ===
8 December
14:30 (D/N)
Scorecard

Bangladesh; 221/8 (44 overs)	v	West Indies; 217 (48 overs)
Mahmudullah 48 (45); Kemar Roach 5/56 (9 overs)		Kieron Pollard 85 (74); Shafiul Islam 3/31 (9 overs)

Bangladesh won by 2 wickets
Sher-e-Bangla Cricket Stadium, Dhaka
Umpires: Enamul Haque (Ban) and Ranmore Martinesz (Sri)
Player of the match: Mahmudullah (Ban)

- Bangladesh won the toss and elected to field

== Twenty20 Series ==
=== Only T20I ===
10 December
18:00 (D/N)
Scorecard

Bangladesh; 179/1 (20 overs)	v	West Indies; 197/4 (20 overs)
Tamim Iqbal 88* (61); Kemar Roach 1/36 (4 overs)		Marlon Samuels 85* (43); Rubel Hossain 2/63 (4 overs)

West Indies won by 18 runs
Sher-e-Bangla Cricket Stadium, Dhaka
Umpires: Enamul Haque (Ban) and Anisur Rahman (Ban)
Player of the match: Marlon Samuels (Win)

- West Indies won the toss and chose to bat
- Twenty20 International debuts: Anamul Haque, Mominul Haque and Sohag Gazi (Bangladesh)

== Media coverage ==
Country/Continent	TV	Other Countries/Continent
Bangladesh	Channel 9, BTV	In other countries where Channel 9 is available in free to air
Asia	Neo Prime	
Africa	Supersport	
Americas	Sportsmax	
United Kingdom	Channel 9 UK	

ESPN also webcast Channel 9's coverage of the entire series live through their WatchESPN application, and have archived it for on-demand replay.

== See also ==
- 2012–13 Bangladeshi cricket season
