= Taijul Islam =

Bangladeshi cricketer (born 1992)

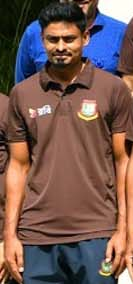
- Islam in 2024

Personal information
- Full name: Taijul Islam
- Born: 7 February 1992 (age 34); Natore, Bangladesh
- Height: 1.65 m (5 ft 5 in)
- Batting: Left-handed
- Bowling: Slow left-arm orthodox
- Role: Bowler

International information
- National side: Bangladesh (2014–present)
- Test debut (cap 73): 5 September 2014 v West Indies
- Last Test: 23 August 2026 v Australia
- ODI debut (cap 116): 1 December 2014 v Zimbabwe
- Last ODI: 15 March 2024 v Sri Lanka
- ODI shirt no.: 12
- T20I debut (cap 64): 13 September 2019 v Zimbabwe
- Last T20I: 15 September 2019 v Afghanistan

Domestic team information
- Years: Team
- 2011–2014: Rajshahi Division
- 2012–2013: Duronto Rajshahi
- 2013: Prime Doleshwar SC
- 2013: Prime Bank CC
- 2014: North Zone

Career statistics
Competition	Test	ODI	FC	LA
Matches	60	20	119	146
Runs scored	920	110	1,882	702
Batting average	10.22	10.00	11.83	11.89
100s/50s	0/0	0/0	0/2	0/1
Top score	47	39*	64	57*
Balls bowled	15,995	1,050	29,901	7,469
Wickets	270	31	535	214
Bowling average	30.21	25.97	28.81	27.01
5 wickets in innings	19	1	38	4
10 wickets in match	2	0	7	0
Best bowling	8/39	5/28	8/39	6/19
Catches/stumpings	28/–	3/–	63/–	51/–
- Source: ESPNcricinfo, 30 June 2026

Taijul Islam (Bengali: তাইজুল ইসলাম; born 7 February 1992) is a Bangladeshi professional cricketer who plays as a left-arm orthodox spin bowler and left-handed batter for the Bangladesh national team and Rajshahi Division. Making his international debut in 2014, he has taken the most wickets in Test matches for Bangladesh.

== Domestic career ==
Taijul Islam has played at domestic level for Rajshahi Division and North Zone, in the Bangladesh Premier League (BPL) for Duronto Rajshahi, and in the Dhaka Premier Division for Prime Doleshwar SC. He made his first-class debut for Rajshahi Division during the 2010–11 season of the National Cricket League.

Taijul Islam initially played in his hometown, Natore, before moving up to the Rajshahi Division league system. He toured Sri Lanka with the Bangladesh national under-19s during the 2009 season, and played three under-19 One Day Internationals and one under-19 Test. Taijul Islam made his first-class debut for Rajshahi Division in April 2011, during the 2010–11 season of the National Cricket League. He played three matches late in the season, taking 14 wickets (including three four-wicket hauls). This impressed Khaled Mashud, a former captain of Bangladesh and leading figure in the Rajshahi team, and reputedly guaranteed his place in the squad for several seasons.

For the 2011–12 season, Taijul Islam secured a place with Prime Doleshwar Sporting Club in the Dhaka Premier Division, which, although it did not yet have list-A status, was one of the strongest one-day leagues in the country. He was also signed to Duronto Rajshahi for the inaugural season of the Bangladesh Premier League, playing three matches, including the team's semi-final loss to the Barisal Burners. Taijul Islam gained more game time during the following season, taking nine wickets from nine matches. Following on from this, in August 2013 he represented the Bangladesh under-23 side at the ACC Emerging Teams Cup in Singapore, which constituted his first matches at list-A level. The Dhaka Premier Division gained list-A status for its 2013 season, running from September to November, and Taijul Islam was one of the competition's leading wicket-takers, finishing with 22 wickets from 15 matches (behind only Farhad Reza for Prime Doleshwar). This including figures of 6/19 against Sheikh Jamal Dhanmondi Club (led by Mushfiqur Rahim), a personal best.

Taijul Islam represented another side sponsored by Prime Bank Limited in a brief Victory Day Cup series at the end of December 2013. He played seven games in that competition, which was his second Twenty20 tournament of the year – he had also represented Rajshahi Division at the Bangladesh Games in April. The 2013–14 season was Taijul Islam's breakout season at first-class level. In the four-zone Bangladesh Cricket League, he took 37 wickets in four matches for North Zone, an amalgam of the Rajshahi and Rangpur Division teams. This included match figures of 12/122 (7/71 and 5/51) against East Zone, the first ten-wicket haul of his career. Against Central Zone, Taijul Islam took match figures of 11/177 (5/88 and 6/89), while in the tournament's final, against South Zone, he took 10/242, which included first-innings figures of 8/86. For these performances, Taijul Islam was named Man of the Tournament. His NCL season for Rajshahi Division was less successful, with 18 wickets from seven matches, though this including a ten-wicket haul against Sylhet Division, for which he was named man of the match.

In October 2018, Taijul Islam was named in the squad for the Khulna Titans team, following the draft for the 2018–19 Bangladesh Premier League. He was the leading wicket-taker for the team in the tournament, with thirteen dismissals in twelve matches. In August 2019, he was one of 35 cricketers named in a training camp ahead of Bangladesh's 2019–20 season. In November 2019, he was selected to play for the Rajshahi Royals in the 2019–20 Bangladesh Premier League.

== International career ==
=== 2014 to 2020 ===
After Taijul Islam's performances during the 2013–14 domestic season, he was named in Bangladesh A's 15-man squad for its tour of the West Indies in May 2014. Bangladesh's senior team also toured later in the year, in August and September 2014. Taijul Islam was a late addition to Bangladesh's squad for the two-Test series, replacing another left-arm spinner, Abdur Razzak. On debut at Kingstown's Arnos Vale Ground (on Saint Vincent), he took 5/135 in the West Indies' first innings of 484/7 declared, bowling the majority of overs in tandem with Shuvagata Hom, an off-spinner also making his Test debut. Taijul Islam thus became the sixth Bangladeshi bowler to take a five-wicket haul on his Test debut.

Taijul Islam was subsequently selected for Bangladesh's home series against Zimbabwe, in October and November 2014. In the first Test of the three-Test series, he took 8/39 (his career best till now) from 16.5 overs in Zimbabwe's second innings, helping to bowl the side out for 114 runs. Taijul Islam became the first Bangladeshi to take eight wickets in a Test innings, breaking Shakib Al Hasan's previous record (7/36 against New Zealand in 2008). Only three left-arm bowlers have recorded better figures in a Test innings – New Zealand's Ajaz Patel (10/119), Sri Lanka's Rangana Herath (9/127) and England's Johnny Briggs (8/11). Later in the match, Taijul Islam featured in an unbroken 19-run partnership for the eighth wicket, hitting the winning runs as Bangladesh won by three wickets. He was subsequently named man of the match.

Making his One Day International debut for Bangladesh against Zimbabwe on 1 December 2014, Taijul Islam finished with figures of 4/11 from seven overs, including a hat-trick. He became the fourth Bangladeshi to take an ODI hat-trick, after Shahadat Hossain, Abdur Razzak, and Rubel Hossain, and the first to take a hat-trick in ODI debut. At the 2015 World Cup played in Australia and New Zealand, Taijul Islam was included in Bangladesh's squad, but played only a single match, taking 0/58 against New Zealand. He was dropped from the squad for the team's next international ODI series, when Pakistan toured in April and May 2015, but was named in the squad for the two-Test series. In the first Test in Khulna, Taijul Islam took 6/163 in Pakistan's only innings, the second-best figures by a Bangladeshi bowler against Pakistan (after Shakib Al Hasan's 6/82 in 2011).

In April 2018, he was one of ten cricketers to be awarded a central contract by the Bangladesh Cricket Board (BCB) ahead of the 2018 season. In September 2019, he was named in Bangladesh's Twenty20 International (T20I) squad for the 2019–20 Bangladesh Tri-Nation Series. He made his T20I debut for Bangladesh, against Zimbabwe, on 13 September 2019, taking a wicket with his first delivery.

=== 2021 to present ===
In May 2022, he was included in the Test and ODI squad of Bangladesh for West Indies tour. He was not included in the playing XI for the Test series and in the first two ODI matches. He was included in the playing XI for the third ODI, making his comeback in ODI since he last played against Zimbabwe in March 2020. In the match, he picked up his first five-wicket haul conceding 28 runs, his best bowling figure in ODIs. His bowling helped Bangladesh sweep the ODI series by a 3–0 margin.

== See also ==
- List of Bangladesh cricketers who have taken five-wicket hauls on Test debut
- List of One Day International cricket hat-tricks
