= Naeem Islam (cricketer, born 1994) =

Bangladeshi cricketer (born 1994)

Personal information
- Full name: Naeem Islam
- Born: 19 October 1994 (age 31)
- Batting: Right-handed
- Bowling: Left-arm orthodox spin
- Role: Bowler

Domestic team information
- Years: Team
- 2010/11: Rajshahi Division
- 2011/12: Rangpur Division
- 2014 present: Chittagong Division
- 2012/13: Duronto Rajshahi
- 2011/12: Bangladesh u-23
- Source: CricketArchive, 26 July 2016

Naeem Islam, often abbreviated as Naeem Islam Jr.; (born 19 October 1994) is a Bangladeshi cricketer. Naeem is a right-handed batsman and a left-arm orthodox spin bowler who plays for Chittagong Division. Early in his career, he was playing for the Bangladesh national under-19 cricket team. He made his First-class debut for Rajshahi Division cricket team against Chittagong Division cricket team in 2011; taking 3 wickets on that's match. He made his List-A debut 2 years later. He made his T20 debut 9 months before the List-A one.
