= Bangladesh national cricket team record by opponent =

Record of Bangladesh cricket

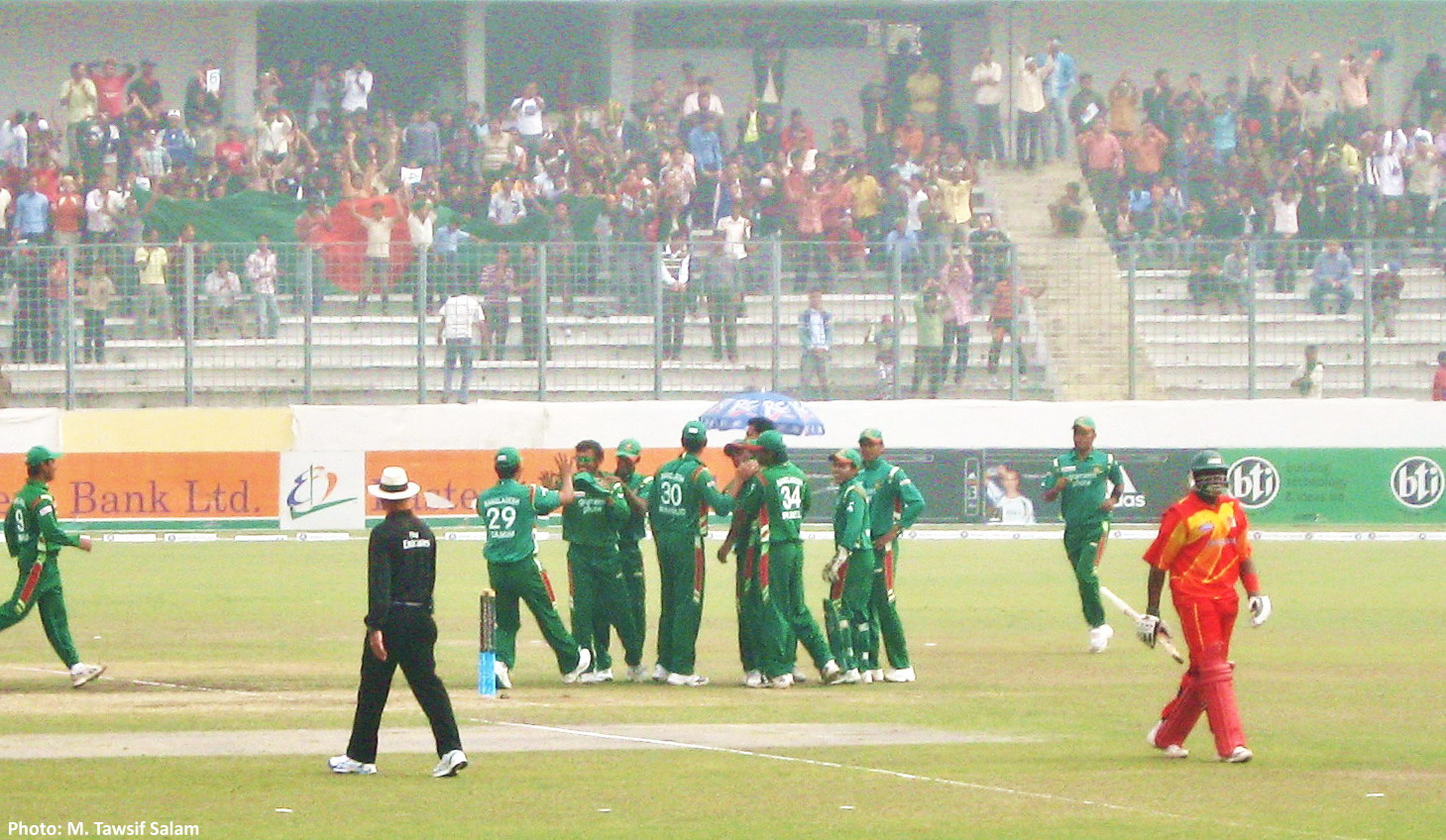
The Bangladeshi national cricket team against the Zimbabwean national cricket team at the Sher-e-Bangla Cricket Stadium, Dhaka in 2009.

The Bangladesh national cricket team represents Bangladesh in international cricket and is a full member of the International Cricket Council with Test and One Day International (ODI) status.

They first competed in international cricket at 31 March 1986, when they played against Pakistan in a one-day international match at Moratuwa, Sri Lanka; they lost the match by 7 wickets. However, before this match Bangladesh did participate in several unofficial games, including matches in ICC Trophy.

Bangladesh was awarded Test status on 26 June 2000 as tenth Test playing nation, but had to wait till November of that same year before playing their first Test match. At 10 November 2000, Bangladeshi team played their first Test match against India, losing the match by 9 wickets. They secured their first Test win against Zimbabwe on 10 January 2005 at MA Aziz Stadium, Chittagong. They won by 226 runs in that first test of the series. Bangladesh needed 35 Tests to achieve the feat, only New Zealand needed more (45) to win their first Test. Also, Bangladesh took 4 years and 2 months from the date of first Test to win a Test, best to only New Zealand, South Africa and India. Eventually, Bangladesh completed their first bilateral Test series win in that same series when they drew the second and last Test at Bangabandhu National Stadium, Dhaka. Before that Test and Test series win, Bangladesh lost 21 Tests (2001–2004) and 16 bilateral series (2001–2004) in a row, which is the present world record. As of 8 May 2023, Bangladesh have played 137 Test matches; they have won 17 matches, lost 102 matches, and 18 matches were drawn.

After the first ODI against Pakistan in 1986, Bangladesh had to wait till 1997 for their first win. In this period Bangladesh regularly participated in one-day international matches which include tournaments like Asia Cup, Austral-Asia Cup. At 16 May 1998, Bangladesh posted its first ODI win when they beat Kenya in the second match of 1998 Coca-Cola Triangular Series at Lal Bahadur Shastri Stadium, Hyderabad. This win ended their streak of losing 22 ODI matches in a row from their first ODI at 1986, which was the world record that time. Though, in the period of Bangladesh team broken that record to stay winless for 47 matches in row, which consisted of the current world record of 23 straight losses from 1999 to 2002. Besides Bangladesh is the only Test playing side that have lost the first ODI they have played against five non-Test sides which includes Canada, Kenya, Ireland, Netherlands and Afghanistan. Even though Ireland and Afghanistan are full members now, during the period of these results, they were listed as associates. Bangladesh won the first bilateral ODI series in 2005, defeating the visiting Zimbabwe side by 3–2 in a 5 match ODI series. In 2019, Bangladesh won the first multi-team international tournament when they defeated West Indies in the final at Malahide Cricket Club Ground, Dublin. It was the first time Bangladesh had won a final match in any format of the game. Till now, this is the only multi-team international tournament Bangladesh have won in any format. As of March 19, 2022, Bangladesh have played 409 ODI matches, winning 148 matches and losing 252 and 9 matches had no result.

Bangladesh played their first Twenty20 International (T20I) against Zimbabwe on 28 November 2006 at Sheikh Abu Naser Stadium, Khulna, winning the match by 43 runs. In 2012, Bangladesh won their first bilateral Twenty20 international series consisting of multiple matches when they whitewashed Ireland 3–0 in a 3 match T20I series. As of July 2025, they have played 194 T20I matches and won 76 of them; 114 were lost, with 4 having no result.

Bangladesh have faced ten teams in Test cricket, India is the biggest rival among them. Bangladesh have registered more wins against Zimbabwe than against any other team, with 7. In ODI matches, Bangladesh have played against 18 teams. They have played against Zimbabwe more frequently in ODI matches with a winning percentage of 62.66 in 47 out of 75 matches. Bangladesh have defeated Zimbabwe on 47 occasions which is their best record in ODIs. They played 17 teams in T20I and have played 13 matches with Zimbabwe. They also have recorded most victories against Zimbabwe defeating them in 9 matches with winning percentage of 69.23.

As of 8 May 2023, Bangladesh is the only Test playing nation, which has not been involved in any tied international matches.

== Key ==
Key for the tables
Symbol	Meaning
Matches	Number of matches played
Won	Number of matches won
Lost	Number of matches lost
Draw	Number of matches ended in a draw
Tied	Number of matches tied
NR	Number of matches ended with no result
Tie+W	Number of matches tied and then won in a tiebreaker such as a bowl-out or Super Over
Tie+L	Number of matches tied and then lost in a tiebreaker such as a bowl-out or Super Over
Win%	Percentage of games won to those played. (Note: Games that did not have a result are not taken into consideration while calculating the result percentage. Ties are counted as half a win.)
Loss%	Percentage of games drawn to those played.
Draw%	Percentage of games lost to those played.
WL Ratio	Ratio of matches won to matches lost
First	Year of the first match played by Australia against the country
Last	Year of the last match played by Australia against the country
†	Team is currently, an associate member of ICC
‡	Team is currently, a full member of ICC, but was an associate member during the first meet.

== Test Cricket ==
Bangladesh's Test cricket records by opponent
Opponent	Matches	Won	Lost	Draw	Tied	Win%	Loss%	Draw%	First	Last
Afghanistan	3	1	1	1	0	50	50	0	2019	2026
Australia	6	1	5	0	0	16.66	83.33	0	2003	2017
England	10	1	9	0	0	10	90	0	2003	2016
India	15	0	13	2	0	0	86.66	13.33	2000	2024
Ireland	3	3	0	0	0	100	0	0	2023	2025
New Zealand	19	2	14	3	0	10.52	73.68	15.78	2001	2023
Pakistan	17	4	12	1	0	0	92.30	7.69	2001	2026
South Africa	16	0	14	2	0	0	87.50	12.50	2002	2024
Sri Lanka	28	1	21	6	0	3.57	75.00	21.42	2001	2025
West Indies	22	5	15	2	0	22.72	68.18	10.00	2002	2024
Zimbabwe	21	9	9	3	0	50	50	15	2001	2026
Total	156	25	112	19	0	16.02	71.81	12.17	2000	2025
Statistics are correct as of Bangladesh v Ireland at Shere Bangla National Stadium, Mirpur

== One Day International ==
Bangladesh's ODI cricket records by opponent
Opponent	Matches	Won	Lost	Tied	NR	Win%	First	Last
Afghanistan ‡	19	11	8	0	0	57.89	2014	2025
Australia	23	3	20	0	1	13.04	1990	2026
Bermuda †	2	2	0	0	0	100	2007	2007
Canada †	2	1	1	0	0	50.00	2003	2007
England	25	5	20	0	0	20.00	2000	2023
Hong Kong †	1	1	0	0	0	100	2004	2004
India	41	8	33	0	1	20.00	1988	2025
Ireland ‡	16	11	2	0	3	84.61	2007	2023
Kenya †	14	8	6	0	0	57.14	1997	2006
Netherlands †	3	1	2	0	0	33.33	2010	2023
New Zealand	46	11	34	0	0	23.91	1990	2025
Pakistan	42	7	35	0	0	16.67	1986	2026
Scotland †	4	4	0	0	0	100	1999	2015
South Africa	25	6	19	0	0	24.00	2002	2023
Sri Lanka	57	12	43	0	2	21.05	1986	2025
United Arab Emirates †	1	1	0	0	0	100	2008	2008
West Indies	50	25	23	0	2	46.00	1999	2025
Zimbabwe	84	52	32	0	0	61.90	1997	2026
Total	435	157	268	0	10	36.94	1986	2023
Statistics are correct as of Bangladesh vs New Zealand at Harare, 3rd ODI, 23 December 2023

== Twenty20 International ==
Bangladesh's T20I cricket records by opponent
Opponent	Matches	Won	Lost	Tied	Tie+W	Tie+L	NR	Win%	First	Last
Afghanistan ‡	16	9	7	0	0	0	0	56.25	2014	2025
Australia	11	4	7	0	0	0	0	36.36	2007	2024
England	4	3	1	0	0	0	0	75.00	2021	2023
Hong Kong †	2	1	1	0	0	0	0	50.00	2014	2025
India	17	1	16	0	0	0	0	5.88	2009	2024
Ireland ‡	11	7	3	0	0	0	1	63.64	2009	2025
Kenya †	1	1	0	0	0	0	0	100	2007	2007
Malaysia †	1	1	0	0	0	0	0	100	2023	2023
Nepal †	2	2	0	0	0	0	0	100	2014	2024
Netherlands †	8	6	1	0	0	0	1	75.00	2012	2025
New Zealand	20	4	15	0	0	0	1	20.00	2010	2026
Oman †	2	2	0	0	0	0	0	100	2016	2021
Pakistan	25	5	20	0	0	0	0	20.00	2007	2025
Papua New Guinea †	1	1	0	0	0	0	0	100	2021	2021
Scotland †	2	0	2	0	0	0	0	0	2012	2021
South Africa	9	0	9	0	0	0	0	0	2007	2024
Sri Lanka	20	8	12	0	0	0	0	40.00	2007	2025
United Arab Emirates †	6	4	2	0	0	0	0	66.66	2016	2024
United States †	3	1	2	0	0	0	0	33.33	2024	2024
West Indies	22	8	12	0	0	0	2	36.36	2007	2025
Zimbabwe	25	17	8	0	0	0	0	68.00	2006	2024
Total	194	76	114	0	0	0	4	39.17	2006	2025
Statistics are correct as of Bangladesh vs Pakistan at Dhaka, 24 July 2025
