= Prime Bank Cricket Club =

Cricket club in Bangladesh

- Nickname: PBCC

Personnel
- Captain: Akbar Ali
- Coach: Talha Jubair
- Owner: Prime Bank

Team information
- Founded: 2012

History
- No. of titles: 1

Prime Bank Cricket Club, owned by Prime Bank Limited, plays List A cricket in the Dhaka Premier Division in Bangladesh. It won the tournament in 2014–15. The club also participated in the 2013–14 Victory Day T20 Cup and was crowned the champions.

== History ==
Prime Bank Limited established its cricket club and associated cricket academy in 2012, when it bought the ownership rights of the Old DOHS Sports Club cricket team. When the Dhaka Premier Division resumed in 2013–14 after a one-season hiatus, with List A status for the first time, Prime Bank Cricket Club was one of the 12 competing teams.

In 2014–15 Old DOHS returned to the Dhaka Premier Division as a separate team. Prime Bank won the first encounter between the two teams by 41 runs, and went on to win the championship.

== List A record ==
- 2013–14: 15 matches, won 7, finished fifth
- 2014–15: 16 matches, won 13, Champions
- 2015–16: 16 matches, won 7, finished sixth
- 2016–17: 16 matches, won 10, finished fourth
- 2017–18: 11 matches, won 5, finished ninth
- 2018–19: 16 matches, won 8, finished fifth
- 2021–22: 15 matches, won 10, finished third
- 2022–23: 16 matches, won 10, finished third
- 2023–24: 16 matches, won 10, finished third
- 2024–25: 11 matches, won 5, finished seventh
- 2025–26: 11 matches, won 8, finished third

Farhad Reza and Mahmudullah captained the team when they won the title in 2014–15. Mithun Ali captained the team in 2021–22 and 2022–23. Irfan Shukkur was the captain in 2024–25.

== Twenty20 record ==
- 2013–14: 7 matches, won 5, Champions
- 2018–19: 3 matches, won 2, Semi Finalist
- 2020–21: 16 matches, won 11, finished second

== Records ==
Prime Bank's highest List A score is 184 by Anamul Haque in 2021–22, and the best bowling figures are 8 for 23 (the overall competition record) by Rejaur Rahman Raja in 2023–24.

== See also ==
- List of Prime Bank Cricket Club cricketers
