= Al-Amin Hossain =

Bangladeshi cricketer (born 1992)

Personal information
- Born: 27 December 1992 (age 33); Jhenaidah, Bangladesh
- Nickname: Al-Amin
- Batting: Right-handed
- Bowling: Right-arm medium-fast
- Role: Bowler

International information
- National side: Bangladesh (2013–2020)
- Test debut (cap 70): 21 October 2013 v New Zealand
- Last Test: 22 November 2019 v India
- ODI debut (cap 109): 17 February 2014 v Sri Lanka
- Last ODI: 3 March 2020 v Zimbabwe
- ODI shirt no.: 15 (formerly 9)
- T20I debut (cap 39): 6 November 2013 v New Zealand
- Last T20I: 11 March 2020 v Zimbabwe
- T20I shirt no.: 4

Domestic team information
- Years: Team
- 2021: Kandy Warriors

Career statistics
Competition	Test	ODI	T20I	FC
Matches	7	15	31	78
Runs scored	90	4	7	418
Batting average	22.50	2.00	3.50	6.63
100s/50s	0/0	0/0	0/0	0/0
Top score	32*	2*	5*	37
Balls bowled	1,016	663	614	11,771
Wickets	9	22	43	234
Bowling average	60.55	27.63	16.97	25.81
5 wickets in innings	0	0	0	9
10 wickets in match	0	0	0	1
Best bowling	3/80	4/51	3/20	7/36
Catches/stumpings	0/–	1/–	4/–	16/–
- Source: Cricinfo, 16 April 2025

Al-Amin Hossain (born 27 December 1992), sometimes known mononymously as Al-Amin, is a Bangladeshi international cricketer. He made his international debut for the Bangladesh cricket team in February 2014.

== Early life and education ==
Hossain was born and raised in Jhenidah district. He attended the University of Rajshahi.

== Domestic and franchise career ==
He took 12 wickets for Khulna and helped them defeat Chittagong by eight wickets in Jessore in 2011. He first ripped through the Chittagong lower order in the first innings, in which they scored just 200 runs, before leaving an even bigger impression in the second innings. Al-Amin finished with 7 for 36 in the second innings, with Chittagong getting bowled out for 144 runs.

He took figures of 9 for 58, helping Khulna kick off the second phase of the National League with an eight-wicket win over Rajshahi in a low-scoring encounter that lasted just two days at the Fatullah Osmani Stadium in Fatullah.

In 2012, he was selected to Bangladesh "A" squad to play against England Lions. In the first unofficial ODI he took the wickets of Joe Root, James Taylor and James Vince as England Lions were reduced to 38 for 4.

In 2013, he took 6 for 16 for Abahani Limited as they rolled over Cricket Coaching School for a paltry 35 to record a 212-run win in the Dhaka Premier League. He was at the forefront of those causing the carnage, picking up the top five batsmen inside the first 11 overs.

In October 2018, he was named in the squad for the Sylhet Sixers team, following the draft for the 2018–19 Bangladesh Premier League. He was the leading wicket-taker for Khulna Division in the 2018–19 National Cricket League, with fourteen dismissals in five matches. In November 2019, he was selected to play for the Cumilla Warriors in the 2019–20 Bangladesh Premier League.

In November 2021, he was selected to play for the Colombo Stars following the players' draft for the 2021 Lanka Premier League.

== International career ==
He was added to Bangladesh Test squad for New Zealand series and he made his Test début in Mirpur Test. He was selected in the 15-man squad to play in the 2015 Cricket World Cup, but was sent home during the tournament for breaking a team curfew.

== Records ==
- On 26 December 2013, during the 2013–14 Victory Day T20 Cup, Al-Amin became the first bowler to take five wickets in an over in Twenty20 cricket.
- In the same match, he also became the first Bangladeshi bowler to take a hat-trick in T20s.
- On 25 November 2015, during the 2015–16 Bangladesh Premier League, he became the first bowler to pick up a hat-trick in the Bangladesh Premier League.
