= Sohag Gazi =

Bangladeshi cricketer (born 1991)

Personal information
- Born: 5 August 1991 (age 35); Barisal, Bangladesh
- Height: 5 ft 11 in (1.80 m)
- Batting: Right-handed
- Bowling: Right-arm off break
- Role: All-rounder

International information
- National side: Bangladesh (2012-present)
- Test debut (cap 64): 13 November 2012 v West Indies
- Last Test: 4 February 2014 v Sri Lanka
- ODI debut (cap 105): 30 November 2012 v West Indies
- Last ODI: 25 August 2014 v West Indies
- ODI shirt no.: 42
- T20I debut (cap 35): 10 December 2012 v West Indies
- Last T20I: 5 July 2015 v South Africa
- T20I shirt no.: 42

Domestic team information
- Years: Team
- 2010–present: Barisal Division
- 2012: Barisal Burners
- 2013: Sylhet Royals
- 2015: Barisal Bulls
- 2016-19: Rangpur Riders
- 2019-20: Sylhet Thunder
- 2022: Sylhet Sunrisers
- 2025: Durbar Rajshahi

Career statistics
Competition	Test	ODI	FC	LA
Matches	10	20	119	171
Runs scored	325	184	5,265	2,411
Batting average	21.66	15.33	29.41	19.60
100s/50s	1/0	0/0	10/23	0/8
Top score	101*	30	146	89
Balls bowled	3,151	919	26,072	8,248
Wickets	38	22	380	181
Bowling average	42.07	32.81	34.53	35.44
5 wickets in innings	2	0	23	2
10 wickets in match	0	0	1	0
Best bowling	6/74	4/29	7/79	5/27
Catches/stumpings	5/–	7/–	85/–	61/–
- Source: Cricinfo, 5 December 2025

Sohag Gazi (Bengali: সোহাগ গাজী; born 5 August 1991) is a Bangladeshi international cricketer. He made his Test debut in first test during West Indies's tour of Bangladesh in 2012, taking six wickets in the second innings. He is the first and so far, only man to score a century and take a hat-trick in the same Test match and the first man to do it twice in first-class matches (the thirteenth to do it once).

== Domestic career ==
A spinner, he made his first-class debut in January 2009 for Barisal against Chittagong, going on to become a regular throughout the 2009/10, 2010/11 and 2011/12 seasons.

A strong start to the 2012/13 season, including an innings of 119 in the opening game of the season against Khulna earned him his maiden Test call-up, and subsequently his Test cap.

He made his One Day debut in October 2010, helping Barisal reach the National Cricket One Day League Final of that year although he failed to take a wicket in a three-wicket defeat for his side.

In 2011, he played for the Bangladesh Academy against a Bangladesh XI, the Bangladesh Cricket Board XI against the touring West Indians and then Bangladesh A against West Indies. He also played two One Day games for Bangladesh A against the England Lions in 2012.

He was the leading wicket-taker for Central Zone in the 2017–18 Bangladesh Cricket League, with 29 dismissals in six matches.

In October 2018, in the 2018–19 National Cricket League, he took his 21st five-wicket haul in first-class cricket. He finished as the leading wicket-taker for Barisal Division in the tournament, with nineteen dismissals in five matches. Later the same month, he was named in the squad for the Rangpur Riders team, following the draft for the 2018–19 Bangladesh Premier League.

He was the leading wicket-taker for Mohammedan Sporting Club in the 2018–19 Dhaka Premier Division Cricket League tournament, with 22 dismissals in 16 matches. In November 2019, he was selected to play for the Sylhet Thunder in the 2019–20 Bangladesh Premier League.

== International career ==
Sohag Gazi is a specialist offspinner who grew up by the Bay of Bengal, and became a slow bowler in Bangladesh. His run-up is shorter than average, but his bowling action itself is fast, followed by a tight follow-through.

The call-up to the National Cricket Academy and the Bangladesh A team followed. He did well in the West Indies for the A team and against other second-string sides but he faced a few dark months in 2012 when an umpire at the Shafi Darashah tournament in Bangalore reported him for a kink in his elbow while bowling the quicker delivery. He went through the usual checks before being given the green signal to play first-class cricket in the 2012–13 season, one which he started off with nine wickets. A seven-wicket haul in the second innings included a hat-trick, and spectacularly, Sohag slammed a hundred in the same game, becoming only the thirteenth cricketer of all time to score a century and take a hat-trick in a first-class match.

He was soon picked up for the Bangladesh team for the first Test against West Indies in November 2012. Having been called up to play against the West Indies in November 2012, he bowled the first ball of the first test in Mirpur. The ball was hit for six by Chris Gayle, the first time this had been achieved in the history of the game, although he finished the innings having bowled 47 overs with figures of three for 145.

His spell of 4 for 29 against West Indies at Khulna was nominated to be one of the best ODI bowling performance of the year by ESPNCricinfo.

In the first Test against New Zealand in October 2013, Gazi scored his maiden test century, remaining unbeaten on 101 as Bangladesh hit 501 in reply to New Zealand's 469. He followed this up with a hat-trick in New Zealand's innings, dismissing Corey Anderson, BJ Watling and Doug Bracewell in consecutive deliveries to become the first person in history to score a century and take a hat-trick in the same Test match. He became the second Bangladeshi to take a Test hat-trick after Alok Kapali.

== ICC ban ==
In October 2014, Gazi was suspended from bowling in international cricket after his action was found to violate the ICC's 15-degree straightening limit. He had been reported for a suspect action by ICC match officials in August, when on tour in the West Indies, and subsequent independent testing revealed all of his deliveries were over the limit. Gazi corrected his action, and although he was cleared for international cricket in February 2015, he never regained selection for Bangladesh in any international format after playing a solitary T20I match against South Africa on his return. He continued to play domestically over the next decade.

== See also ==
- List of Bangladesh cricketers who have taken five-wicket hauls on Test debut
