= Anamul Haque =

Bangladeshi cricketer

Anamul Haque Bijoy
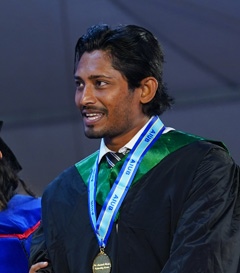
- Anamul Haque Bijoy in 2023

Personal information
- Full name: Mohammad Anamul Haque Bijoy
- Born: 16 December 1992 (age 33); Kushtia, Khulna, Bangladesh
- Height: 5 ft 8 in (1.73 m)
- Batting: Right-handed
- Bowling: Right arm medium fast
- Role: Opening-Batter

International information
- National side: Bangladesh (2012-present)
- Test debut (cap 66): 8 March 2013 v Sri Lanka
- Last Test: 25 June 2025 v Sri Lanka
- ODI debut (cap 103): 30 November 2012 v West Indies
- Last ODI: 18 March 2024 v Sri Lanka
- ODI shirt no.: 66
- T20I debut (cap 33): 10 December 2012 v West Indies
- Last T20I: 30 August 2022 v Afghanistan

Domestic team information
- Years: Team
- 2008–2011: Dhaka Division
- 2011–present: Khulna Division
- 2012–2013: Dhaka Gladiators
- 2015–2017: Chittagong Vikings
- 2017: Quetta Gladiators
- 2018–2019: Comilla Victorians
- 2018–present: Prime Bank
- 2019–present: South Zone
- 2019: Dhaka Platoon
- 2022: Sylhet Sunrisers
- 2023: Fortune Barishal
- 2024: Khulna Tigers
- 2024–2025: Durbar Rajshahi

Career statistics
Competition	Test	ODI	T20I	FC
Matches	8	49	20	138
Runs scored	162	1,352	445	9,272
Batting average	10.80	29.39	24.72	41.39
100s/50s	0/0	3/5	0/1	24/49
Top score	39	120	58	216
Balls bowled	0	0	0	196
Wickets	0	0	0	6
Bowling average	–	–	–	21.83
5 wickets in innings	–	–	–	0
10 wickets in match	–	–	–	0
Best bowling	–	–	–	2/2
Catches/stumpings	5/–	15/0	4/1	146/36
Medal record
Men's Cricket
Representing Bangladesh
ACC Asia Cup
Runner-up	2012 Bangladesh
Asian Games
Bronze medal – third place	2014 Incheon	Team
South Asian Games
Gold medal – first place	2010 Dhaka	Team
- Source: ESPNcricinfo, 4 June 2026

Mohammad Anamul Haque Bijoy (born 16 December 1992) is a Bangladeshi cricketer. He is a wicket-keeper and right-handed batsman. He is the first player to score 1000 runs and most runs in a single List-A tournament.

== Early life ==
His hometown is Kushtia. He went to Kushtia Zilla School until the sixth grade. Later he was a student at Bangladesh Krira Shikkha Protishtan (BKSP).

== U19 career ==
He captained the Bangladesh U 19 World Cup team in Australia where he was the highest run scorer in the tournament. He made two hundred and won a Player of the Match there.

== Domestic career ==
=== National Cricket League ===
Anamul made his first-class debut for Dhaka Division in the National Cricket League in late 2008. He earned the early call-up through some impressive work at the BKSP, the country's biggest sports institute. In his debut season he managed to score just 70 runs in 6 innings with an average of 11.66.

In the 2010/11 National Cricket League, Bijoy scored 466 runs in 10 innings with an average of 66.57 including 2 centuries and 2 half centuries.

In the 2012 National Cricket League he was selected to play for Khulna Division. He scored 816 runs with an average of 42.94 including 3 centuries and 3 half centuries with the best of 193. He finished the tournament as the highest run scorer.

In the 2012-13 National Cricket League he scored 374 runs in 8 innings with an average of 62.33 including 2 centuries and 1 half century.

In the 2013-14 National Cricket League he scored 193 runs in 6 innings with an average of 38.60 including 1 century and 1 half century.

In the 2015-16 National Cricket League, Bijoy managed to score 272 runs in 7 innings with an average of 38.85 including 1 century.

He scored 451 runs in 8 innings with an average of 64.42 including 2 centuries and 2 half centuries in the 2016–17 National Cricket League.

In September 2017, he scored his maiden double-century (216) in first-class cricket, for Khulna Division against Rangpur Division in the 2017–18 National Cricket League. He finished the tournament as the highest run scorer with 619 runs in 8 innings with an average of 77.37 including 2 centuries and 1 half century.

=== Dhaka Premier Division Cricket League ===
He was the leading run-scorer in the 2018–19 Bangladesh Cricket League, with 658 runs in six matches. He was also the leading run-scorer for Prime Bank Cricket Club in the 2018–19 Dhaka Premier Division Cricket League tournament, with 552 runs in 16 matches.

In May 2021, he was named as the captain in Prime Bank Cricket Club's squad for the 2021 Dhaka Premier Division Twenty20 Cricket League. In the 2021–22 Dhaka Premier Division Cricket League, he became the first batter in the League's history to score 1,000 runs in a season. He finished the season with 1,138 runs in an average of 81.28 including 3 centuries and 9 half centuries.

In 2023 he was signed by the Abahani Limited cricket team in the 2022–23 Dhaka Premier Division Cricket League. He finished the season as the second highest run scorer of tournament. He scored 834 in 16 innings with an average of 59.57 including 3 centuries and 3 half centuries.

In 2024 he was again signed by the Abahani Limited cricket team in the 2023–24 Dhaka Premier Division Cricket League. He scored 563 runs in 13 innings with an average of 70.37 including 2 centuries and 2 half centuries.

He became the highest run scorer of 2024–25 Dhaka Premier Division Cricket League scoring 874 runs in 14 innings with an average of 79.45 including 4 centuries and 4 half centuries. During a super six match against Legends of Rupganj he scored his 50th century in recognized cricket and became the first Bangladeshi cricketer to do so.

=== Bangladesh Premier League ===
==== Dhaka Gladiators ====
In the 2012 Bangladesh Premier League, Dhaka Gladiators bought Anamul for $20,000. He scored 176 runs in 12 matches. In the 2013 season of BPL, he was bought again by the Dhaka Gladiators for $121,000. Anamul was the second top-scorer for his team that season scoring 356 runs in 13 innings along with 3 fifties.

==== Chittagong Vikings ====
Anamul was signed by the Chittagong Kings in the 2015 Bangladesh Premier League. He accumulated 142 runs in the nine innings he played. The following season playing for the same team, Anamul scored 250 runs in 13 innings with 1 fifty. In the 2017-18 season, he scored 206 runs in 9 innings with 2 half-centuries.

==== Comilla Victorians ====
Anamul played the 2018-19 Bangladesh Premier League for the Comilla Victorians. He scored 200 runs in 14 innings.

==== Dhaka Platoon ====
In the 2019-20 Bangladesh Premier League, Anamul played for the Dhaka Platoon. He scored 198 runs in 13 innings that season with 1 50+ hand.

==== Sylhet Sunrisers ====
In the 2021-22 Bangladesh Premier League season, Anamul scored 280 runs in 9 innings playing for the Sylhet Sunrisers with 1 half-century.

==== Fortune Barishal ====
In the 2023 edition, Mahmudullah played for Fortune Barishal. He scored 280 runs in 12 innings with an average of 23.33 including 1 half century.

==== Khulna Tigers ====
Bijoy was signed by the Khulna Tigers in the 2024 Bangladesh Premier League. He scored 296 runs in 12 innings with an average of 32.88 including 3 fifties.

==== Durbar Rajshahi ====
He was signed by the Durbar Rajshahi in the 2025 Bangladesh Premier League. During a league stage match against Khulna Tigers he scored his maiden BPL hundred. He scored 100* off 57 deliveries, hitting 9 fours and 5 sixes. He finished the season as the 5th highest run scorer scoring 392 runs in 12 innings with an average of 39.20 including 1 century and 2 half centuries.

== International career ==
He made his place in Bangladesh squad for 2012 Asia Cup. He made his Test debut against Sri Lanka on 8 March 2013 at Galle. He made his ODI debut against West Indies in Bangladesh in the first game of 2012 Sahara Cup in Khulna and went on to make his maiden century in the second game of the series on 2 December 2012. His match winning 120 earned him the title of the Player of the Match only in his second ODI of his career.

His knock of 120 against West Indies at Khulna was nominated to be one of the best ODI batting performances of the year by ESPNCricinfo.

He was then called up for the Bangladesh squad for the 2015 Cricket World Cup. He played as an opening batsmen alongside Tamim Iqbal. On the fifth of March, Anamul dislocated his shoulder while trying to save a boundary and that resulted in him being ruled out of the world cup. Anamul was ruled into Bangladesh national cricket team in West Indies series but he didn't perform as well as expected.

=== Return to the National side ===
He came back in Bangladesh National Cricket team in April 2022 against West Indies for the Test and ODI series after scoring more than 1000 runs in 2021–22 Dhaka Premier Division Cricket League. He was included in the eleven of Bangladesh for the 2nd Test of 2 match Test series. He managed to score just 23 and 4 runs in the 1st and 2nd innings respectively. He was not included in the playing eleven of ODI series. Later he was included in the squad of Bangladesh for Zimbawe tour. He featured in all three ODI and was the highest run scorer for Bangladesh with 169 runs including 2 fifties. In December 2022 he featured in the ODI series against India. In the series Bijoy showed a display of poor form, he only managed to score just 33 runs in 3 innings. As a result, he was dropped from the squad of Bangladesh for England series.

In August 2023, he was included in the squad of Bangladesh for 2023 Asia Cup as replacement of Litton Das. He played just one match in the tournament, where he scored just 4 runs off 11 balls in the final match of Bangladesh against India. Later he was included in the Bangladesh squad for series against New Zealand but did not featured in any match of the series.

In March 2024, Sri Lanka national cricket team toured Bangladesh for 3 ODI, 3 T20I and 2 Test matches. Bijoy was included in the ODI and T20I squad of Bangladesh. He did not played any T20I match of series. He also did not featured in the first two matches of the ODI series but was featured in the 3rd and the final ODI of the series where he managed to score just 12 runs off 22 balls.

On 24 April 2025, Bijoy was included in the Test squad of Bangladesh for the 2nd Test against Zimbawe. He returned to the Test squad for the first time since December 2022.

== Personal life ==
He is married to Fariya Era. They have a daughter together.

== International centuries ==
One Day International centuries by Anamul Haque
No.	Runs	Against	Venue	H/A	Date	Result	Ref
1	120	West Indies	Sheikh Abu Naser Stadium, Khulna	Home	2 December 2012	Won	
2	100	Pakistan	Sher-e-Bangla National Cricket Stadium, Dhaka	Home	4 March 2014	Lost	
3	109	West Indies	National Cricket Stadium, St. George's	Away	20 August 2014	Lost	

== Records and achievements ==
- He is the first cricketer to score 1,000 or more runs in a single season of a List A cricket tournament.
- He is the first cricketer from Bangladesh to score 50 centuries in recognized cricket.
