= Rubel Hossain =

Bangladeshi cricketer

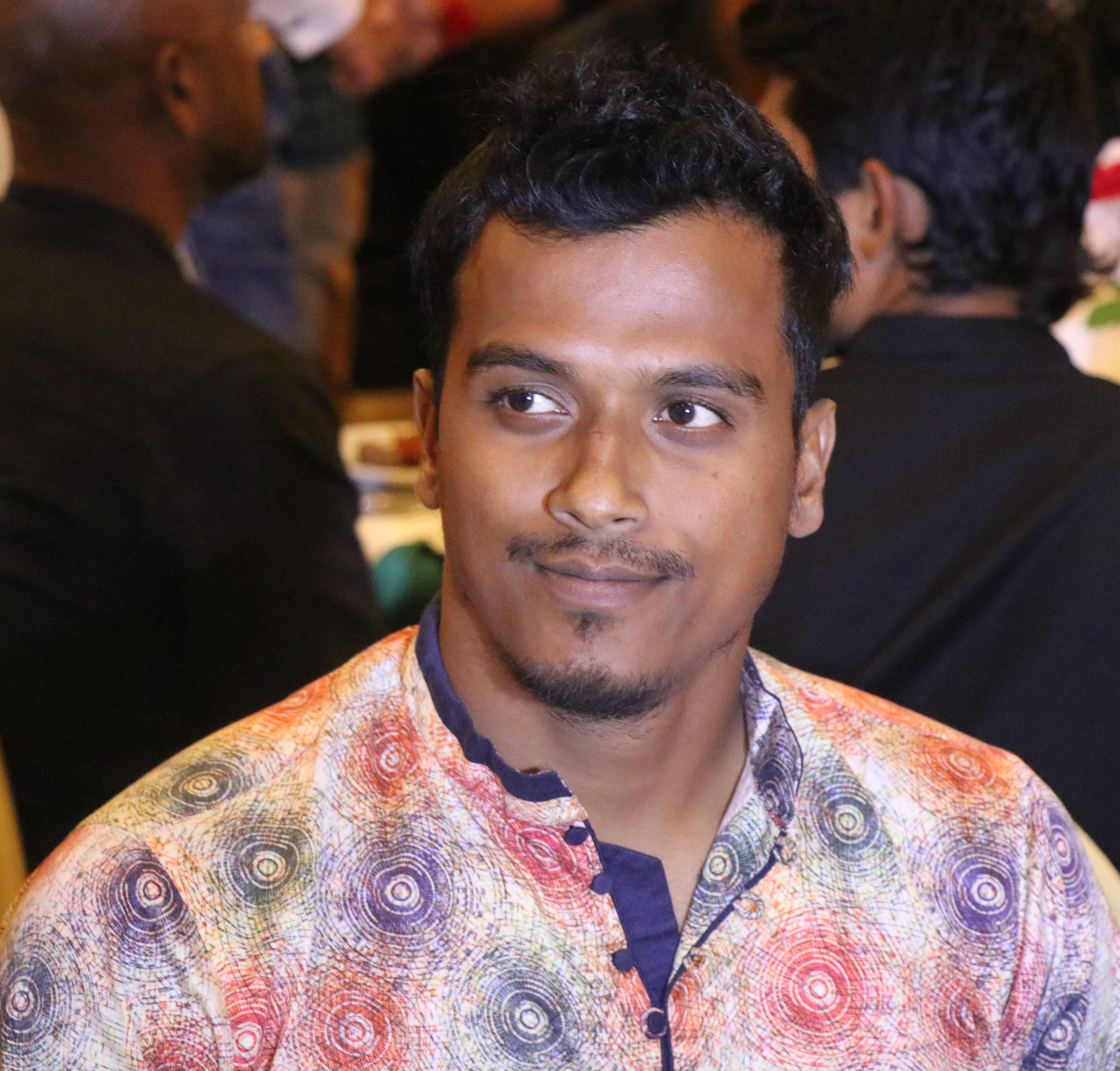
- Rubel Hossain in 2018

Personal information
- Full name: Mohammad Rubel Hossain
- Born: 1 January 1990 (age 36); Bagerhat, Khulna, Bangladesh
- Height: 1.75 m (5 ft 9 in)
- Batting: Right-handed
- Bowling: Right arm fast
- Role: Bowler

International information
- National side: Bangladesh (2009–2021)
- Test debut (cap 56): 9 July 2009 v West Indies
- Last Test: 7 February 2020 v Pakistan
- ODI debut (cap 95): 14 January 2009 v Sri Lanka
- Last ODI: 26 March 2021 v New Zealand
- ODI shirt no.: 34
- T20I debut (cap 23): 6 June 2009 v India
- Last T20I: 1 April 2021 v New Zealand
- T20I shirt no.: 34

Domestic team information
- Years: Team
- 2007/08–present: Chittagong Division
- 2012: Chittagong Kings
- 2015: Sylhet Super Stars
- 2016–2017: Rangpur Riders
- 2018/19: Dhaka Dynamites
- 2019/20: Chattogram Challengers

Career statistics
Competition	Test	ODI	T20I	FC
Matches	27	104	28	60
Runs scored	265	144	20	555
Batting average	9.46	4.96	4.00	9.25
100s/50s	0/0	0/0	0/0	0/0
Top score	45*	17	8*	45*
Balls bowled	4,223	4,678	579	8,141
Wickets	36	129	28	97
Bowling average	76.77	34.31	32.57	54.03
5 wickets in innings	1	1	0	4
10 wickets in match	0	0	0	0
Best bowling	5/166	6/26	3/31	7/51
Catches/stumpings	11/–	20/–	1/–	18/–
Medal record
Representing Bangladesh
Men's Cricket
Asian Games
Bronze medal – third place	2014 Incheon	Team
- Source: ESPNcricinfo, 1 April 2021

Mohammad Rubel Hossain (Bengali: মোহাম্মদ রুবেল হোসেন born 1 January 1990) is a Bangladeshi cricketer. Rubel made his international debut in January 2009 aged only 19. He has the highest bowling average of any pace bowler to have bowled at least 2,000 deliveries in Test cricket. He is a quick bowler with a slingy action similar to Lasith Malinga's. Hossain announced his retirement from Test cricket on 19 September 2022 and international cricket on 16 April 2026.

== Early and domestic career ==
Hossain's first-class debut was for Chittagong Division in 2007, where he picked up one wicket for one hundred and thirty seven runs (1/137) against Khulna Division. After a string of good performances in the National Cricket League, he was selected to play for the Bangladesh Under-19 team, and soon after, the Bangladesh A team.

The Bangladesh Cricket Board in 2012 founded the six-team Bangladesh Premier League, a twenty20 tournament to be held in February that year. An auction was held for teams to buy players, and Hossain was bought by the Sylhet Royals for $70,000. In October 2018, he was named in the squad for the Dhaka Dynamites team, following the draft for the 2018–19 Bangladesh Premier League. In November 2019, he was selected to play for the Chattogram Challengers in the 2019–20 Bangladesh Premier League.

Hossain innovated a technique of delivery named 'Butterfly'.

== International career ==
Hossain was named in the One Day International squad for the tri-series with Sri Lanka and Zimbabwe and made his debut in the third game of the round-robin stage, a game Bangladesh needed to win to progress to the final. He cleaned up the middle-order and tail-enders with a 4-wicket haul in 5.3 overs. He also played in the tri-series final, where he had a poor end to the game, but retained his place for the three ODI series against Zimbabwe soon after. More good performances led to him being included in the Test squad to face the West Indies for the first time. He made his debut at Arnos Vale, and took three wickets in West Indies' first innings, and also formed a 31-run and 10th wicket partnership with Shahadat Hossain in Bangladesh's first innings. Hossain also featured in two Twenty20 matches at the 2009 ICC World Twenty20.

His best ODI figure was of six wickets for twenty six runs (6/26) vs New Zealand at Mirpur, where he also took a hat-trick and was nominated to be one of the best ODI bowling performance of the year 2013 by ESPNcricinfo.

He consistently bowled around 145 km/h in the 2015 Cricket World Cup.

During the 2017 ICC Champions Trophy in England, Rubel suffered a fractured jaw after accidentally colliding with a glass door at the team hotel. He was flown back to Dhaka for surgery and was ruled out for at least six weeks. Following his recovery, Rubel rejoined the national squad and resumed full training, reflecting his determination to return to international cricket.

In April 2018, Hossain was one of ten cricketers to be awarded a central contract by the Bangladesh Cricket Board (BCB) ahead of the 2018 season. In April 2019, he was named in Bangladesh's squad for the 2019 Cricket World Cup. In September 2021, he was named as one of the two reserve players in Bangladesh's squad for the 2021 ICC Men's T20 World Cup. On 26 October 2021, he was added to Bangladesh's main squad for the tournament, after Mohammad Saifuddin was ruled out due to a back injury.

On 19 September 2022, Rubel Hossain announced his retirement from Test cricket. In a post on his official Facebook page, he stated that stepping away from the longer format would allow emerging fast bowlers more opportunities and enable him to focus on limited-overs cricket. He concluded his Test career with 27 matches, taking 36 wickets at an average of 76.77.

On 15 April 2026, Rubel Hossain announced his retirement from international cricket. In his official Facebook page, he said, "I am pacer Rubel Hossain. I played 27 Tests, 104 ODIs and 28 T20Is for Bangladesh. The national team is my emotion. But at some point, I had to say goodbye to international cricket. With that in mind, I am bidding farewell to international cricket."

== Controversies ==
Bangladeshi police arrested Hossain after a Bangladeshi actress named Naznin Akter Happy filed rape charges against him. He was in police custody for three days but later the court granted him bail to participate for the 2015 Cricket World Cup. On Bangladesh's victory over England, in which Hossain played a starring role, Nazneen withdrew the charges. Because of Rubel's performance against England, Happy's lawyer, Debul Day, ended his participation in the case saying "I no longer wish to fight against Rubel after seeing Bangladesh succeed. Rubel should feel no pressure."
