= 2009 World Twenty20 squads =

This is a list of the squads picked for the men's 2009 ICC World Twenty20. This was the second ICC World Twenty20 tournament and was held between 5 and 21 June 2009.

== Australia ==
Australia named their 15-man squad on 5 May 2009. On 4 June 2009 Andrew Symonds was dropped from the team and replaced by Cameron White.

Coach: Tim Nielsen

No.	Player	Date of birth	T20s	Batting	Bowling style	First-class team
14	Ricky Ponting (c)	19 December 1974	15	Right	Right arm medium	(Australia) Tasmanian Tigers
59	Nathan Bracken	29 December 1977	17	Right	Left arm fast medium	(Australia) New South Wales Blues
23	Michael Clarke	2 April 1981	16	Right	Slow left arm orthodox	(Australia) New South Wales Blues
57	Brad Haddin	23 October 1977	8	Right	Wicket-keeper	(Australia) New South Wales Blues
43	Nathan Hauritz	18 October 1981	1	Right	Right arm off break	(Australia) New South Wales Blues
20	Ben Hilfenhaus	15 March 1983	6	Right	Right arm fast-medium	(Australia) Tasmanian Tigers
39	James Hopes	24 October 1978	10	Right	Right arm medium	(Australia) Queensland Bulls
29	David Hussey	15 July 1977	8	Right	Right arm off break	(Australia) Victorian Bushrangers
48	Michael Hussey	27 May 1975	16	Left	Right arm medium	(Australia) Western Warriors
25	Mitchell Johnson	2 November 1981	9	Left	Left arm fast medium	(Australia) Western Warriors
58	Brett Lee	8 November 1976	14	Right	Right arm medium	(Australia) New South Wales Blues
10	Peter Siddle	25 November 1984	1	Right	Right arm medium	(Australia) Victorian Bushrangers
31	David Warner	27 October 1986	5	Left	Left arm leg break	(Australia) New South Wales Blues
33	Shane Watson	17 June 1981	4	Right	Right arm fast medium	(Australia) Queensland Bulls
7	Cameron White	18 August 1983	7	Right	Right arm leg break	(Australia) Victorian Bushrangers

== Bangladesh ==
Bangladesh named their 15-man squad on 4 May 2009.

Coach: Jamie Siddons

No.	Player	Date of birth	T20s	Batting	Bowling style	First-class team
	Mohammad Ashraful (c)	7 July 1984		Right	Right arm Leg spin	(Bangladesh) Dhaka Division
	Shakib Al Hasan	24 March 1987		Left	Slow left arm orthodox	(Bangladesh) Khulna Division
	Mithun Ali	13 February 1990		Right	Wicket-keeper	(Bangladesh) Sylhet Division
	Raqibul Hasan	8 October 1987		Right	Right arm Leg spin	(Bangladesh) Barisal Division
	Rubel Hossain	1 January 1990		Right	Right arm medium	(Bangladesh) Chittagong Division
	Shahadat Hossain	7 August 1986		Right	Right arm fast-medium	(Bangladesh) Dhaka Division
	Tamim Iqbal	20 March 1989		Left		(Bangladesh) Chittagong Division
	Naeem Islam	31 December 1986		Right		(Bangladesh) Rajshahi Division
2	Mashrafe Mortaza	5 October 1983		Right	Right arm fast-medium	(Bangladesh) Khulna Division
	Mahmudullah	4 February 1986		Right	Right arm Off spin	(Bangladesh) Dhaka Division
15	Mushfiqur Rahim	1 September 1988		Right	Wicket-keeper	(Bangladesh) Rajshahi Division
	Shamsur Rahman	5 June 1988		Right		(Bangladesh) Dhaka Division
	Syed Rasel	3 July 1984		Left	Left arm fast-medium	(Bangladesh) Khulna Division
	Abdur Razzak	15 June 1982		Left	Slow left arm orthodox	(Bangladesh) Khulna Division
	Junaid Siddique	30 October 1987		Left	Right arm Off break	(Bangladesh) Rajshahi Division

== England ==
England named their 15-man squad on 1 May 2009.

Coach: Andy Flower

No.	Player	Date of birth	T20s	Batting	Bowling style	First-class team
5	Paul Collingwood (c)	26 May 1976	15	Right	Right arm medium	(England) Durham Dynamos
9	James Anderson	30 July 1982	11	Left	Right arm fast-medium	(England) Lancashire Lightning
42	Ravi Bopara	4 May 1985	2	Right	Right arm medium	(England) Essex Eagles
8	Stuart Broad	24 June 1986	12	Left	Right arm fast-medium	(England) Nottinghamshire Outlaws
15	James Foster	15 April 1980	0	Right	Wicket-keeper	(England) Essex Eagles
35	Rob Key	12 May 1979	0	Right	Right arm off break	(England) Kent Spitfires
32	Dimitri Mascarenhas	30 October 1977	11	Right	Right arm medium	(England) Hampshire Hawks (New Zealand) Otago Volts
39	Eoin Morgan	10 September 1986	0	Left	Right arm medium Wicket-keeper	(England) Middlesex Panthers
48	Graham Napier	6 January 1980	0	Right	Right arm fast	(England) Essex Eagles
24	Kevin Pietersen	27 June 1980	15	Right	Right arm off break	(England) Hampshire Hawks
95	Adil Rashid	17 February 1988	0	Right	Right arm leg break	(England) Yorkshire Carnegie
3	Owais Shah	22 October 1978	11	Right	Right arm off break	(England) Middlesex Panthers
78	Ryan Sidebottom	15 January 1978	4	Left	Left arm fast medium	(England) Nottinghamshire Outlaws
66	Graeme Swann	24 March 1979	3	Right	Right arm off break	(England) Nottinghamshire Outlaws
45	Luke Wright	7 March 1985	8	Right	Right arm medium-fast	(England) Sussex Sharks

== India ==
India named their 15-man squad on 4 May 2009. On 9 June 2009, the injured Virender Sehwag was replaced by Dinesh Karthik.

Coach: Gary Kirsten

No.	Player	Date of birth	T20Is	Batting	Bowling style	First-class team / IPL team
7	Mahendra Singh Dhoni (c)	7 July 1981	13	Right	Wicket-keeper	(India) Jharkhand / Chennai Super Kings
5	Gautam Gambhir	14 October 1981	12	Left	Right arm leg break	(India) Delhi / Delhi Daredevils
84	Ravindra Jadeja	6 December 1988	2	Left	Slow left arm orthodox	(India) Saurashtra / Rajasthan Royals
34	Zaheer Khan	7 October 1978	4	Right	Left arm fast medium	(India) Mumbai / Mumbai Indians
8	Praveen Kumar	2 October 1986	1	Right	Right arm medium-fast	(India) Uttar Pradesh / Royal Challengers Bangalore
30	Pragyan Ojha	5 September 1986	0	Left	Slow left arm orthodox	(India) Hyderabad / Deccan Chargers
63	Irfan Pathan	27 October 1984	13	Left	Left arm medium-fast	(India) Baroda / Kings XI Punjab
28	Yusuf Pathan	17 November 1982	4	Right	Right arm off break	(India) Baroda / Rajasthan Royals
48	Suresh Raina	27 November 1986	4	Left	Right arm off break	(India) Uttar Pradesh / Chennai Super Kings
**	Virender Sehwag	20 October 1978		Right	Right arm off break	(India) Delhi / Delhi Daredevils
29	Ishant Sharma	2 September 1988	4	Right	Right arm fast	(India) Delhi / Kolkata Knight Riders
45	Rohit Sharma	30 April 1987	8	Right	Right arm off break	(India) Mumbai / Deccan Chargers
3	Harbhajan Singh	3 July 1980	12	Right	Right arm off break	(India) Punjab / Mumbai Indians
9	R. P. Singh	6 December 1985	8	Right	Left arm fast medium	(India) Uttar Pradesh / Deccan Chargers
12	Yuvraj Singh	12 December 1981	10	Left	Slow left arm orthodox	(India) Punjab / Kings XI Punjab
Replacement players
19	Dinesh Karthik	1 June 1985	6	Right	Wicket-keeper	(India) Tamil Nadu / Delhi Daredevils

== Ireland ==
Coach: Phil Simmons

No.	Player	Date of birth	T20s	Batting	Bowling style	First-class team
	William Porterfield (c)	6 September 1984		Left		(England) Gloucestershire Gladiators
	Andre Botha	12 September 1975		Left	Right arm medium
	Jeremy Bray	30 November 1973		Left
	Peter Connell	13 August 1981		Right	Right arm medium-fast
	Alex Cusack	29 October 1980		Right	Right arm medium-fast
	Trent Johnston	29 April 1974		Right	Right arm fast-medium
	Kyle McCallan	27 August 1975		Right	Right arm off break
	John Mooney	10 February 1982		Left	Right arm medium
	Kevin O'Brien	4 March 1984		Right	Right arm medium-fast	(England) Nottinghamshire Outlaws
	Niall O'Brien	8 November 1981		Left	Wicket-keeper	(England) Northants Steelbacks
	Boyd Rankin	5 July 1984		Left	Right arm fast medium	(England) Warwickshire Bears
	Paul Stirling	3 September 1990		Right	Right arm off break
	Regan West	27 April 1979		Left	Left arm fast medium
	Andrew White	3 July 1980		Right	Right arm off break
	Gary Wilson	5 February 1986		Left	Wicket-keeper	(England) Surrey Brown Caps

== Netherlands ==
Coach: Peter Drinnen

No.	Player	Date of birth	T20s	Batting	Bowling style	First-class team or Domestic team
	Jeroen Smits (c)	21 June 1972	4	Right	Wicket-keeper	(Netherlands) HCC Den Haag
	Peter Borren	21 August 1983	4	Right	Right arm medium	(Netherlands) VRA Amsterdam
	Mudassar Bukhari	26 December 1983	4	Right	Right arm medium-fast
	Tom de Grooth	14 May 1979	4	Right	Right arm off break	(Netherlands) HCC Den Haag
	Maurits Jonkman	20 March 1986	0	Right	Right arm medium
	Alexei Kervezee	11 September 1989	0	Right	Right arm medium	(England) Worcestershire Royals
	Dirk Nannes	16 May 1976	0	Right	Left arm medium	(Australia) Victorian Bushrangers
	Ruud Nijman	15 June 1982	0	Right	Right arm medium-fast
	Darron Reekers	26 May 1973	4	Right	Right arm medium	(Netherlands) Quick Den Haag
	Edgar Schiferli	17 May 1976	4	Left	Right arm medium-fast	(Netherlands) Quick Den Haag
	Pieter Seelaar	2 July 1987	3	Right	Slow left arm orthodox	(Netherlands) Hermes DVS
	Daan van Bunge	19 October 1982	4	Right	Right arm leg break	(Netherlands) Voorburg CC
	Bas Zuiderent	3 March 1977	0	Right	Right arm medium	(Netherlands) VOC Rotterdam
	Ryan ten Doeschate	30 June 1980	3	Right	Right arm medium-fast	(England) Essex Eagles
	Eric Szwarczynski	13 February 1983	4	Left		(Netherlands) VRA Amsterdam

== New Zealand ==
New Zealand named their 15-man squad on 7 April 2009. On 11 June 2009, Aaron Redmond was called up to cover for the injured Jesse Ryder.

Coach: Andy Moles

No.	Player	Date of birth	T20s	Batting	Bowling style	First-class team
11	Daniel Vettori (c)	27 January 1979	14	Left	Slow left arm orthodox	(New Zealand) Northern Districts Knights
4	Neil Broom	20 November 1983	3	Right	Right-arm medium	(New Zealand) Otago Volts
2	Ian Butler	24 November 1981	3	Right	Right-arm fast	(New Zealand) Otago Volts
51	Brendon Diamanti	30 April 1981	0	Right	Right-arm medium-fast	(New Zealand) Central Districts Stags
70	James Franklin	7 November 1980	6	Left	Left-arm fast-medium	(New Zealand) Wellington Firebirds
31	Martin Guptill	30 September 1986	3	Right	Right-arm off break	(New Zealand) Auckland Aces
42	Brendon McCullum	27 September 1981	21	Right	Wicket-keeper	(New Zealand) Otago Volts
15	Nathan McCullum	1 September 1980	4	Right	Right-arm off break	(New Zealand) Otago Volts
21	Peter McGlashan	22 June 1979	2	Right	Wicket-keeper	(New Zealand) Central Districts Stags
37	Kyle Mills	15 March 1979	9	Right	Right-arm fast-medium	(New Zealand) Auckland Aces
75	Iain O'Brien	10 July 1976	3	Right	Right-arm fast-medium	(New Zealand) Wellington Firebirds
24	Jacob Oram	28 July 1978	13	Left	Right-arm fast-medium	(New Zealand) Central Districts Stags
77	Jesse Ryder	6 August 1984	6	Left	Right-arm medium	(New Zealand) Wellington Firebirds
56	Scott Styris	10 July 1975	15	Right	Right-arm medium	(New Zealand) Auckland Aces
3	Ross Taylor	8 March 1984	17	Right	Right-arm off break	(New Zealand) Central Districts Stags
Replacement players
16	Aaron Redmond	23 September 1979	0	Right	Right-arm leg break	(New Zealand) Otago Volts

== Pakistan ==
Pakistan named their 15-man squad on 4 May 2009. On 21 May 2009, Shoaib Akhtar was withdrawn and replaced by Rao Iftikhar Anjum. During the tournament, Abdul Razzaq was called up to replace the injured Yasir Arafat on 10 June 2009.

Coach: Intikhab Alam

No.	Player	Date of birth	T20s	Batting	Bowling style	Domestic Twenty20 team
75	Younus Khan (c)	29 November 1977	15	Right	Right-arm medium	(Pakistan) Peshawar Panthers
93	Ahmed Shehzad	23 November 1991	1	Right	Right-arm leg break	(Pakistan) Lahore Lions
28	Fawad Alam	8 October 1985	7	Left	Slow left arm orthodox	(Pakistan) Karachi Dolphins
21	Iftikhar Anjum	1 December 1980	1	Right	Right-arm medium	(Pakistan) Islamabad Leopards
23	Kamran Akmal	13 January 1982	17	Right	Wicket-keeper	(Pakistan) Lahore Lions
22	Misbah-ul-Haq	28 May 1974	15	Right	Right-arm leg break	(Pakistan) Faisalabad Wolves
90	Mohammad Amir	13 April 1992	0	Left	Left-arm fast-medium	(Pakistan) Rawalpindi Rams
50	Saeed Ajmal	14 October 1977	1	Right	Right-arm off break	(Pakistan) Faisalabad Wolves
1	Salman Butt	7 October 1984	13	Left	Right-arm off break	(Pakistan) Lahore Lions
10	Shahid Afridi	1 March 1980	16	Right	Right-arm leg break	(Pakistan) Karachi Dolphins
94	Shahzaib Hasan	25 December 1989	0	Right	Right-arm off break	(Pakistan) Karachi Zebras
51	Shoaib Malik	1 February 1982	17	Right	Right-arm off break	(Pakistan) Sialkot Stallions
33	Sohail Tanvir	12 December 1984	11	Left	Left-arm fast-medium	(Pakistan) Rawalpindi Rams
55	Umar Gul	14 April 1984	14	Right	Right-arm fast-medium	(Pakistan) Peshawar Panthers
24	Yasir Arafat	12 March 1982	4	Right	Right-arm medium	(Pakistan) Rawalpindi Rams
Replacement players
12	Abdul Razzaq	2 December 1979	2	Right	Right-arm fast-medium	(Pakistan) Lahore Lions

== South Africa ==
South Africa named their 15-man squad on 4 May 2009.

Coach: Mickey Arthur

No.	Player	Date of birth	T20s	Batting	Bowling style	First-class team
15	Graeme Smith (c)	1 February 1981	12	Left	Right-arm off break	(South Africa) Cape Cobras
29	Yusuf Abdulla	17 January 1983	1	Left	Left-arm fast-medium	(South Africa) Dolphins
22	Johan Botha	2 May 1982	9	Right	Right-arm off break	(South Africa) Warriors
9	Mark Boucher	3 December 1976	13	Right	Wicket-keeper	(South Africa) Warriors
17	AB de Villiers	17 February 1984	15	Right	Right-arm medium/Wicket-keeper	(South Africa) Titans
21	JP Duminy	14 April 1984	10	Left	Right-arm off break	(South Africa) Cape Cobras
09	Herschelle Gibbs	23 February 1974	14	Right	Right-arm leg break	(South Africa) Cape Cobras
3	Jacques Kallis	16 October 1975	4	Right	Right-arm fast-medium	(South Africa) Warriors
81	Albie Morkel	10 June 1981	16	Left	Right-arm medium-fast	(South Africa) Titans
65	Morné Morkel	6 October 1984	8	Left	Right-arm fast	(South Africa) Titans
23	Justin Ontong	4 January 1980	3	Right	Right-arm off break	(South Africa) Cape Cobras
36	Wayne Parnell	30 July 1989	2	Left	Left-arm medium-fast	(South Africa) Warriors
13	Robin Peterson	4 August 1979	5	Left	Slow left arm orthodox	(South Africa) Cape Cobras
8	Dale Steyn	27 June 1983	6	Right	Right-arm fast	(South Africa) Titans
52	Roelof van der Merwe	31 December 1984	1	Right	Slow left arm orthodox	(South Africa) Titans

== Sri Lanka ==
Sri Lanka named their 15-man squad on 4 May 2009.

Coach: Trevor Bayliss

No.	Player	Date of birth	T20s	Batting	Bowling style	First-class team
11	Kumar Sangakkara (c)	27 October 1977	8	Left	Wicket-keeper	(Sri Lanka) Kandurata
10	Indika de Saram	2 September 1973	1	Right	Right-arm off break/Wicket-keeper	(Sri Lanka) Ruhuna
23	Tillakaratne Dilshan	14 October 1976	13	Right	Right-arm off break	(Sri Lanka) Basnahira Dakuna
07	Sanath Jayasuriya	30 June 1969	12	Left	Slow left arm orthodox	(Sri Lanka) Ruhuna
27	Mahela Jayawardene	27 May 1977	12	Right	Right-arm medium	(Sri Lanka) Wayamba
92	Nuwan Kulasekara	22 July 1982	2	Right	Right-arm medium	(Sri Lanka) Basnahira Utura
28	Farveez Maharoof	7 September 1984	7	Right	Right-arm fast-medium	(Sri Lanka) Wayamba
99	Lasith Malinga	28 August 1983	9	Right	Right-arm fast	(Sri Lanka) Ruhuna
69	Angelo Mathews	2 June 1987	1	Right	Right-arm fast-medium	(Sri Lanka) Basnahira Utura
40	Ajantha Mendis	11 March 1985	4	Right	Right-arm off break, Right-arm leg break	(Sri Lanka) Wayamba
42	Jehan Mubarak	10 January 1981	10	Left	Right-arm off break	(Sri Lanka) Wayamba
08	Muttiah Muralitharan	17 April 1972	2	Right	Right-arm off break	(Sri Lanka) Kandurata
05	Chamara Silva	14 December 1979	9	Right	Right-arm leg break	(Sri Lanka) Basnahira Dakuna
97	Thilan Thushara	1 March 1981	4	Left	Left-arm fast-medium	(Sri Lanka) Kandurata
61	Isuru Udana	17 February 1988	1	Right	Left-arm medium-fast	(Sri Lanka) Wayamba

== West Indies ==
West Indies named their 15-man squad on 9 May 2009.

Coach: John Dyson

No.	Player	Date of birth	T20s	Batting	Bowling style	First-class(National) team
45	Chris Gayle (c)	21 September 1979	7	Left	Right arm off break	Jamaica
44	Lionel Baker	6 September 1984	3	Left	Right arm medium fast	Leeward Islands
62	Sulieman Benn	22 July 1981	4	Left	Slow left arm orthodox	Barbados
08	Dave Bernard Jnr.	19 July 1981	0	Right	Right arm medium fast	Jamaica
47	Dwayne Bravo	7 October 1983	9	Right	Right arm medium fast	Trinidad and Tobago
06	Shivnarine Chanderpaul	16 August 1974	9	Left	Right arm leg break	Guyana (England) Durham Dynamos
20	Fidel Edwards	6 February 1982	8	Right	Right arm fast	Barbados
72	Andre Fletcher	28 November 1987	2	Right	Right arm medium fast	Windward Islands
10	Xavier Marshall	27 March 1986	3	Right	Right arm off break	Jamaica
55	Kieron Pollard	21 May 1987	4	Right	Right arm medium fast	Trinidad and Tobago
80	Denesh Ramdin	13 March 1985	10	Right	Wicket-keeper	Trinidad and Tobago
88	Darren Sammy	20 December 1983	6	Right	Right arm fast medium	Windward Islands
53	Ramnaresh Sarwan	23 June 1980	5	Right	Right arm leg break	Guyana
54	Lendl Simmons	25 January 1985	2	Right	Right arm medium fast/Wicket-keeper	Trinidad and Tobago
75	Jerome Taylor	22 June 1984	6	Right	Right arm fast	Jamaica

== Scotland ==
In July 2008 Zimbabwe, under pressure from South Africa and England over political matters related to Robert Mugabe, pulled out of the tournament of their own volition, creating an additional (third) space for an associate nation. Scotland won the third place playoff to qualify.

ScotlandTeam

Kyle Coetzer
Gavin Hamilton (c)
Neil McCallum
Navdeep Poonia
Fraser Watts
Ryan Watson
Majid Haq
Jan Stander
Craig Wright
Colin Smith (wk)
John Blain
Gordon Drummond
Richie Berrington
Glenn Rogers
Dewald Nel
