= 2001–02 National Cricket League =

Cricket tournament

- Dates: 26 December 2001 – 16 March 2002
- Administrator: BCB
- Cricket format: First-class cricket
- Tournament format: Double round-robin
- Host: Bangladesh
- Champions: Dhaka Division
- Participants: 6
- Matches: 30
- Most runs: Minhajul Abedin (1012)
- Most wickets: Mohammad Rafique (42)

The 2001–02 National Cricket League was the 3rd edition of the National Cricket League, a first-class cricket competition held in Bangladesh. The six teams were into round robin stage. The tournament began on 26 December 2001 and ended on 16 March 2002.

== Points table ==
Team	Pld	W	L	LWF	DWF	DLF	Pts
Dhaka Division	10	9	0	0	0	1	54
Rajshahi Division	10	5	2	1	2	0	36
Chittagong Division	10	2	2	0	5	1	22
Sylhet Division	10	3	3	0	0	4	18
Khulna Division	10	1	3	1	3	2	14
Barisal Division	10	0	8	0	0	2	0

	Barisal Division	Chittagong Division	Dhaka Division	Khulna Division	Rajshahi Division	Sylhet Division
Barisal Division		Chittagong; 197 runs	Dhaka; Innings and 4 runs	Match drawn	Rajshahi; Innings and 123 runs	Sylhet; 153 runs
Chittagong Division	Match drawn		Dhaka; 24 runs	Match drawn	Chittagong; Innings and 14 runs	Match drawn
Dhaka Division	Dhaka; 9 wickets	Match drawn		Dhaka; 10 wickets	Dhaka; 7 wickets	Dhaka; 7 wickets
Khulna Division	Khulna; 6 wickets	Match drawn	Dhaka; 138 runs		Rajshahi; Innings and 29 runs	Sylhet; Innings and 5 runs
Rajshahi Division	Rajshahi; Innings and 11 runs	Rajshahi; 8 wickets	Dhaka; 109 runs	Match drawn		Rajshahi; Innings and 20 runs
Sylhet Division	Sylhet; 49 runs	Match drawn	Dhaka; Innings and 89 runs	Match drawn	Match drawn	
Scorecards

== Venues ==
Venues for the 2001–02 National Cricket League
