= 2017 Champions Trophy squads =

Listing of teams chosen for the 2017 ICC Champions Trophy

This is a list of squads selected for the 2017 ICC Champions Trophy.

== Group A ==
=== Australia ===
Coach: (Australia) Darren Lehmann

No.	Player	Date of birth	ODIs	Batting	Bowling style	List A team
49	Steve Smith (c)	2 June 1989 (aged 27)	95	Right	Right-arm leg spin	(Australia) New South Wales
31	David Warner (vc)	27 October 1986 (aged 30)	93	Left	Right-arm leg Spin	(Australia) New South Wales
30	Pat Cummins	8 May 1993 (aged 24)	28	Right	Right-arm Fast	(Australia) New South Wales
5	Aaron Finch	17 November 1986 (aged 30)	79	Right	Slow left-arm orthodox	(Australia) Victoria
41	John Hastings	4 November 1985 (aged 31)	28	Right	Right-arm fast medium	(Australia) Victoria
38	Josh Hazlewood	8 January 1991 (aged 26)	35	Left	Right-arm fast medium	(Australia) New South Wales
62	Travis Head	29 December 1993 (aged 23)	22	Left	Right-arm off spin	South Australia
21	Moisés Henriques	1 February 1989 (aged 28)	8	Right	Right-arm fast medium	(Australia) New South Wales
50	Chris Lynn	10 April 1990 (aged 27)	1	Right	Slow left-arm orthodox	(Australia) Queensland
32	Glenn Maxwell	14 October 1988 (aged 28)	74	Right	Right-arm off spin	(Australia) Victoria
19	James Pattinson	3 May 1990 (aged 27)	15	Left	Right-arm Fast	(Australia) Victoria
56	Mitchell Starc	30 January 1990 (aged 27)	65	Left	Left-arm Fast	(Australia) New South Wales
17	Marcus Stoinis	16 August 1989 (aged 27)	3	Right	Right-arm fast medium	(Australia) Victoria
13	Matthew Wade (wk)	26 December 1987 (aged 29)	87	Left	Right-arm fast medium	(Australia) Victoria
63	Adam Zampa	31 March 1992 (aged 25)	22	Right	Right-arm legbreak	South Australia

=== Bangladesh ===
Coach: (Sri Lanka) Chandika Hathurusingha

No.	Player	Date of birth	ODIs	Batting	Bowling style	List A team
2	Mashrafe Mortaza (c)	5 September 1983 (aged 33)	175	Right	Right arm fast medium	(Bangladesh) Khulna Division
45	Imrul Kayes	2 February 1987 (aged 30)	65	Left	–	(Bangladesh) Khulna Division
30	Mahmudullah	4 February 1986 (aged 31)	141	Right	Right arm off break	(Bangladesh) Dhaka Division
53	Mehedi Hasan	25 October 1997 (aged 19)	5	Right	Right arm off break	(Bangladesh) Khulna Division
32	Mosaddek Hossain	10 December 1995 (aged 21)	15	Right	Right arm off break	(Bangladesh) Dhaka Division
90	Mustafizur Rahman	6 September 1995 (aged 21)	18	Left	Left arm fast medium	(Bangladesh) Khulna Division
15	Mushfiqur Rahim (wk)	9 June 1987 (aged 29)	173	Right	Right arm	(Bangladesh) Rajshahi Division
34	Rubel Hossain	1 January 1990 (aged 27)	73	Right	Right arm fast	(Bangladesh) Chittagong Division
1	Sabbir Rahman	22 November 1991 (aged 25)	39	Right	Right arm legbreak	(Bangladesh) Rajshahi Division
13	Shafiul Islam	6 October 1989 (aged 27)	56	Right	Right arm fast medium	(Bangladesh) Rajshahi Division
75	Shakib Al Hasan	24 March 1987 (aged 30)	173	Left	Slow left-arm orthodox	(Bangladesh) Khulna Division
59	Soumya Sarkar	25 February 1993 (aged 24)	27	Left	Right arm medium fast	(Bangladesh) Khulna Division
6	Sunzamul Islam	24 March 1987 (aged 30)	1	Left	Slow left-arm orthodox	(Bangladesh) Rajshahi Division
28	Tamim Iqbal	20 March 1989 (aged 28)	169	Left	Right arm off break	(Bangladesh) Chittagong Division
3	Taskin Ahmed	3 April 1995 (aged 22)	27	Left	Right arm fast	(Bangladesh) Dhaka Metropolis

=== England ===
Coach: (Australia) Trevor Bayliss

No.	Player	Date of birth	ODIs	Batting	Bowling style	List A team
16	Eoin Morgan (c)	10 September 1986 (aged 30)	181	Left	Right-arm medium	(England) Middlesex
18	Moeen Ali	18 June 1987 (aged 29)	54	Left	Right-arm off break	(England) Worcestershire
51	Jonny Bairstow	26 September 1989 (aged 27)	26	Right	–	(England) Yorkshire
28	Jake Ball	14 March 1991 (aged 26)	10	Right	Right-arm fast-medium	(England) Nottinghamshire
7	Sam Billings (wk)	15 June 1991 (aged 25)	11	Right	–	(England) Kent
63	Jos Buttler (vc) (wk)	8 September 1990 (aged 26)	90	Right	–	(England) Lancashire
2	Alex Hales	3 January 1989 (aged 28)	46	Right	Right-arm medium	(England) Nottinghamshire
17	Liam Plunkett	6 April 1985 (aged 32)	53	Right	Right-arm fast	(England) Yorkshire
95	Adil Rashid	17 February 1988 (aged 29)	46	Right	Right-arm leg break	(England) Yorkshire
66	Joe Root	30 December 1990 (aged 26)	88	Right	Right-arm off break	(England) Yorkshire
20	Jason Roy	21 July 1990 (aged 26)	43	Right	Right-arm medium	(England) Surrey
55	Ben Stokes	4 June 1991 (aged 25)	55	Left	Right-arm fast-medium	(England) Durham
15	David Willey	28 February 1990 (aged 27)	28	Left	Left-arm fast-medium	(England) Yorkshire
19	~~Chris Woakes~~	2 March 1989 (aged 28)	62	Right	Right-arm fast-medium	(England) Warwickshire
33	Mark Wood	11 January 1990 (aged 27)	15	Right	Right-arm fast	(England) Durham
25	Steven Finn	4 April 1989 (aged 28)	69	Right	Right-arm fast-medium	(England) Middlesex

Chris Woakes was ruled out of the rest of the tournament after suffering a side-strain during England's opening match against Bangladesh. Steven Finn was added to the squad as his replacement.

=== New Zealand ===
Coach: (New Zealand) Mike Hesson

No.	Player	Date of birth	ODIs	Batting	Bowling style	List A team
22	Kane Williamson (c)	8 August 1990 (aged 26)	111	Right	Right-arm off break	(New Zealand) Northern Districts
78	Corey Anderson	13 December 1990 (aged 26)	46	Left	Left-arm medium-fast	(New Zealand) Northern Districts
18	Trent Boult	22 May 1989 (aged 28)	48	Right	Left-arm fast-medium	(New Zealand) Northern Districts
4	Neil Broom	23 November 1983 (aged 33)	34	Right	Right-arm medium	(New Zealand) Otago
71	Colin de Grandhomme	22 July 1986 (aged 30)	9	Right	Right-arm fast-medium	(New Zealand) Auckland
31	Martin Guptill	30 September 1986 (aged 30)	143	Right	Right-arm off break	(New Zealand) Auckland
48	Tom Latham (wk)	2 April 1992 (aged 25)	58	Left	Right-arm medium	(New Zealand) Canterbury
81	Mitchell McClenaghan	11 June 1986 (aged 30)	48	Left	Left-arm medium-fast	(New Zealand) Auckland
20	Adam Milne	13 April 1992 (aged 25)	34	Right	Right-arm fast	(New Zealand) Central Districts
83	James Neesham	17 September 1990 (aged 26)	38	Left	Right-arm fast-medium	(New Zealand) Otago
39	Jeetan Patel	23 March 1980 (aged 37)	43	Left	Right-arm off break	(New Zealand) Wellington
54	Luke Ronchi (wk)	23 April 1981 (aged 36)	82	Right	–	(New Zealand) Wellington
74	Mitchell Santner	5 February 1992 (aged 25)	36	Left	Slow left-arm orthodox	(New Zealand) Northern Districts
38	Tim Southee (vc)	11 December 1988 (aged 28)	116	Right	Right-arm medium-fast	(New Zealand) Northern Districts
3	Ross Taylor	8 March 1984 (aged 33)	187	Right	Right-arm off break	(New Zealand) Central Districts

== Group B ==
=== India ===
Coach: (India) Anil Kumble

No.	Player	Date of birth	ODIs	Batting	Bowling style	List A team
18	Virat Kohli (c)	5 November 1988 (aged 28)	179	Right	Right-arm medium	(India) Delhi
25	Shikhar Dhawan	5 December 1985 (aged 31)	76	Left	Right-arm off break	(India) Delhi
27	Ajinkya Rahane	5 June 1988 (aged 28)	73	Right	Right-arm medium	(India) Mumbai
45	Rohit Sharma	30 April 1987 (aged 30)	153	Right	Right-arm off break	(India) Mumbai
12	Yuvraj Singh	12 December 1981 (aged 35)	296	Left	Slow left arm orthodox	(India) Punjab
7	MS Dhoni (wk)	7 July 1981 (aged 35)	286	Right	Right-arm medium	(India) Jharkhand
9	~~Manish Pandey~~	10 September 1989 (aged 27)	12	Right	Right-arm medium	(India) Karnataka
81	Kedar Jadhav	26 March 1985 (aged 32)	15	Right	Right-arm off break	(India) Maharashtra
99	Ravichandran Ashwin	7 September 1986 (aged 30)	105	Right	Right-arm off break	(India) Tamil Nadu
8	Ravindra Jadeja	6 December 1988 (aged 28)	129	Left	Slow left arm orthodox	(India) Saurashtra
33	Hardik Pandya	11 October 1993 (aged 23)	7	Right	Right-arm medium-fast	(India) Baroda
15	Bhuvneshwar Kumar	5 December 1990 (aged 26)	59	Right	Right-arm medium-fast	(India) Uttar Pradesh
93	Jasprit Bumrah	6 December 1993 (aged 23)	11	Right	Right-arm medium-fast	(India) Gujarat
11	Mohammed Shami	9 March 1990 (aged 27)	47	Right	Right-arm fast-medium	(India) Bengal
19	Umesh Yadav	25 October 1987 (aged 29)	63	Right	Right-arm fast	(India) Vidarbha
21	Dinesh Karthik (wk)	2 June 1985 (aged 31)	71	Right	Right-arm off break	(India) Tamil Nadu

Ahead of the tournament Dinesh Karthik replaced Manish Pandey, who was ruled out with a side strain.

=== Pakistan ===
Coach: (South Africa) Mickey Arthur

No.	Player	Date of birth	ODIs	Batting	Bowling style	List A team
54	Sarfaraz Ahmed (c) (wk)	22 May 1987 (aged 30)	70	Right	–	(Pakistan) Sindh
56	Babar Azam	15 October 1994 (aged 22)	26	Right	Right arm off break	(Pakistan) Baluchistan
19	Ahmed Shehzad	23 November 1991 (aged 25)	78	Right	Right arm leg spin	(Pakistan) Baluchistan
79	Azhar Ali	19 February 1985 (aged 32)	45	Right	Right arm leg spin	(Pakistan) Baluchistan
41	Faheem Ashraf	1 January 1994 (aged 23)	–	Left	Right arm medium	(Pakistan) Punjab
39	Fakhar Zaman	10 April 1990 (aged 27)	–	Left	Slow left arm orthodox	(Pakistan) Khyber Pakhtunkhwa
32	Hasan Ali	7 February 1994 (aged 23)	16	Right	Right arm medium-fast	(Pakistan) Islamabad
9	Imad Wasim (vc)	18 December 1988 (aged 28)	21	Left	Slow left arm orthodox	(Pakistan) Islamabad
83	Junaid Khan	24 December 1989 (aged 27)	58	Right	Left arm fast	(Pakistan) Sindh
5	Mohammad Amir	13 April 1992 (aged 25)	32	Left	Left arm fast	(Pakistan) Sindh
8	Mohammad Hafeez	17 October 1980 (aged 36)	185	Right	Right arm off break	(Pakistan) Khyber Pakhtunkhwa
29	Shadab Khan	4 October 1998 (aged 18)	3	Right	Right arm leg spin	(Pakistan) Islamabad
18	Shoaib Malik	1 February 1982 (aged 35)	247	Right	Right arm off break	(Pakistan) Punjab
89	Haris Sohail	9 January 1989 (aged 28)	22	Left	Slow left arm orthodox	(Pakistan) Islamabad
47	~~Wahab Riaz~~	28 June 1985 (aged 31)	78	Right	Left arm fast	(Pakistan) Punjab
15	Rumman Raees	18 October 1991 (aged 25)	–	Right	Left arm fast-medium	(Pakistan) Sindh

Umar Akmal was included in the provisional squad named by the PCB, but failed a fitness test and was called back from England. Haris Sohail was named as his replacement.

Wahab Riaz was ruled out of the tournament with an ankle injury after his team's opening match. He was replaced in the squad by Rumman Raees.

=== Sri Lanka ===
Coach: (Sri Lanka) Graham Ford

No.	Player	Date of birth	ODIs	Batting	Bowling style	List A team
69	Angelo Mathews (c)	2 June 1987 (aged 29)	180	Right	Right-arm fast-medium	(Sri Lanka) Colts
75	Dhananjaya de Silva (vc)	6 September 1991 (aged 25)	16	Right	Right-arm off-break	(Sri Lanka) Tamil Union
36	Dinesh Chandimal (wk)	18 November 1989 (aged 27)	125	Right	Right-arm off-break	(Sri Lanka) Nondescripts
48	Niroshan Dickwella (wk)	23 June 1993 (aged 23)	11	Left	–	(Sri Lanka) Nondescripts
14	Asela Gunaratne	8 January 1986 (aged 31)	13	Right	Right-arm medium-fast	(Sri Lanka) Army
92	Nuwan Kulasekara	22 July 1982 (aged 34)	183	Right	Right-arm fast-medium	(Sri Lanka) Colts
16	~~Chamara Kapugedera~~	24 February 1987 (aged 30)	97	Right	Right-arm medium	(Sri Lanka) Colombo
82	Suranga Lakmal	10 March 1987 (aged 30)	61	Right	Right-arm fast-medium	(Sri Lanka) Tamil Union
99	Lasith Malinga	28 August 1983 (aged 33)	191	Right	Right-arm fast	(Sri Lanka) Nondescripts
2	Kusal Mendis	2 February 1995 (aged 22)	25	Right	Right-arm leg-break	(Sri Lanka) Bloomfield
55	~~Kusal Perera~~ (wk)	17 August 1990 (aged 26)	68	Left	–	(Sri Lanka) Colts
1	Thisara Perera	3 April 1989 (aged 28)	117	Left	Right-arm medium-fast	(Sri Lanka) Sinhalese Sports Club
63	Nuwan Pradeep	19 October 1986 (aged 30)	17	Right	Right-arm fast-medium	(Sri Lanka) Bloomfield
41	Seekkuge Prasanna	27 June 1985 (aged 31)	35	Right	Right-arm Leg-break	(Sri Lanka) Army
85	Lakshan Sandakan	10 June 1991 (aged 25)	6	Right	Slow left-arm wrist-spin	(Sri Lanka) Saracens
44	Upul Tharanga (vc)	2 February 1985 (aged 32)	201	Left	–	(Sri Lanka) Nondescripts
70	Danushka Gunathilaka	17 March 1991 (aged 26)	19	Left	Right-arm off-break	(Sri Lanka) Sinhalese Sports Club|}

Chamara Kapugedera injured his knee during the tournament and was replaced by Danushka Gunathilaka. Kusal Perera was ruled out of the tournament with a hamstring injury and was replaced by Dhananjaya de Silva.

=== South Africa ===
Coach: (South Africa) Russell Domingo

No.	Player	Date of birth	ODIs	Batting	Bowling style	List A team
17	AB de Villiers (c)	17 February 1984 (aged 33)	219	Right	Right-arm medium	(South Africa) Titans
1	Hashim Amla	31 March 1983 (aged 34)	153	Right	Right-arm medium	(South Africa) Cape Cobras
28	Farhaan Behardien	9 October 1983 (aged 33)	56	Right	Right-arm fast-medium	(South Africa) Titans
12	Quinton de Kock (wk)	17 December 1992 (aged 24)	82	Left	–	(South Africa) Lions
18	Faf du Plessis (vc)	13 July 1984 (aged 32)	110	Right	Leg break	(South Africa) Titans
21	Jean-Paul Duminy	14 April 1984 (aged 33)	174	Left	Right-arm off break	(South Africa) Cape Cobras
16	Keshav Maharaj	7 February 1990 (aged 27)	2	Right	Left arm orthodox	(South Africa) Dolphins
10	David Miller	10 June 1989 (aged 27)	96	Left	Right-arm off break	(South Africa) Dolphins
65	Morné Morkel	6 October 1984 (aged 32)	109	Left	Right-arm fast	(South Africa) Titans
2	Chris Morris	30 April 1987 (aged 30)	26	Right	Right-arm fast-medium	(South Africa) Titans
7	Wayne Parnell	30 July 1989 (aged 27)	63	Left	Left-arm medium-fast	(South Africa) Warriors
23	Andile Phehlukwayo	3 March 1996 (aged 21)	16	Left	Right-arm fast–medium	(South Africa) Dolphins
29	Dwaine Pretorius	29 March 1989 (aged 28)	10	Right	Right-arm fast-medium	(South Africa) Lions
25	Kagiso Rabada	25 May 1995 (aged 22)	37	Left	Right-arm fast	(South Africa) Lions
99	Imran Tahir	27 March 1979 (aged 38)	75	Right	Leg break	(South Africa) Lions
