= Abul Bashar (cricketer) =

Bangladeshi cricketer (born 1986)

Personal information
- Full name: Mohammed Abul Bashar Shaikh
- Born: 25 December 1986 (age 39)
- Batting: Right-handed
- Bowling: Right-arm medium fast
- Role: Batting all-rounder

Domestic team information
- Years: Team
- 2004–2010: Barishal Division
- 2011–2012: Dhaka Division

Career statistics
Competition	FC	LA
Matches	42	47
Runs scored	1,242	545
Batting average	17.74	17.58
100s/50s	0/4	0/2
Top score	82*	65
Balls bowled	2,102	1,525
Wickets	36	23
Bowling average	28.61	53.21
5 wickets in innings	2	1
10 wickets in match	0	0
Best bowling	6/62	5/46
Catches/stumpings	38/–	14/–
- Source: ESPNcricinfo

Mohammed Abul Bashar Shaikh (born 25 December 1986) is a Bangladeshi first-class cricketer. He is a right-handed batsman and a right-arm medium fast bowler. He represented Barisal Division cricket team in National Cricket League from 2004 to 2010. He also represented Dhaka Division cricket team in 2011-12 National Cricket League. He made his first-class debut for Barisal Division on March 4, 2005, and List A debut for Barisal Division on February 12, 2005.
