= 2003–04 Bangladeshi cricket season =

The 2003–04 Bangladeshi cricket season featured Bangladesh playing a Test series against England for the first time.

== International tours ==
=== English Cricket team in Bangladesh ===
England played 2 Test matches and 3 one day internationals (ODI) against Bangladesh. England won both the Test matches and won all three ODIs, winning each of the ODIs by 7 wickets.

=== 2004 ICC Under-19 World Cup ===
During February and March 2004 Bangladesh hosted the 2004 ICC Under-19 Cricket World Cup. This tournament featured a number of future international players for Bangladesh, including Enamul Haque Jr who ended the tournament as the highest wicket taker.

== Domestic competitions ==
=== Honours ===
	First-class	Limited Overs
National Cricket League Champions	Dhaka Division	Chittagong Division
Most Runs	633 - (Bangladesh) Nuruzzaman (Rajshahi)	400 - (Bangladesh) Masumud Dowla (Chittagong)
Most Wickets	63 - (Bangladesh) Saifullah Khan (Rajshahi)	19 - (Bangladesh) Shabbir Khan (Chittagong)

=== National Cricket League ===
Team	Pld	W	L	DWF	DLF	ND	Pts
Dhaka Division	10	5	1	2	2	0	42
Sylhet Division	10	5	1	2	2	0	42
Khulna Division	10	1	3	3	1	2	24
Rajshahi Division	10	2	3	1	3	1	24
Chittagong Division	10	1	4	3	1	1	22
Barisal Division	10	1	3	1	3	2	20

	Barisal Division	Chittagong Division	Dhaka Division	Khulna Division	Rajshahi Division	Sylhet Division
Barisal Division		Match drawn	Dhaka; Innings and 25 runs	Match drawn	Match drawn	Match drawn
Chittagong Division	Barisal; 3 wickets		Match drawn	Match drawn	Chittagong; 8 wickets	Chittagong; 10 wickets
Dhaka Division	Dhaka; 63 runs	Dhaka; 226 runs		Dhaka; 5 wickets	Match drawn	Match drawn
Khulna Division	Match drawn	Match drawn	Dhaka; 152 runs		Rajshahi; 6 wickets	Match drawn
Rajshahi Division	Match drawn	Match drawn	Rajshahi; 8 wickets	Match drawn		Sylhet; 13 runs
Sylhet Division	Sylhet; 9 wickets	Sylhet; 124 runs	Match drawn	Khulna; 76 runs	Sylhet; 138 runs	
Scorecards

=== National Cricket One Day League ===
Team	Pld	W	L	NRR	Pts
Chittagong Division	10	8	2	-0.068	16
Rajshahi Division	10	7	3	+0.983	14
Dhaka Division	10	5	5	+0.212	10
Sylhet Division	10	4	6	-0.221	8
Barisal Division	10	3	7	-0.384	6
Khulna Division	10	3	7	-0.525	6

	Barisal Division	Chittagong Division	Dhaka Division	Khulna Division	Rajshahi Division	Sylhet Division
Barisal Division		Chittagong; 7 wickets	Barisal; 4 wicketrs	Barisal; 50 runs	Rajshahi; 95 runs	Sylhet; 10 runs
Chittagong Division	Chittagong; 2 wickets		Chittagong; 1 runs	Chittagong; 14 runs	Chittagong; 2 wickets	Chittagong; 8 wickets
Dhaka Division	Barisal; 1 wicket	Dhaka; 7 wickets		Dhaka; 4 wickets	Dhaka; 14 runs	Dhaka; 99 runs
Khulna Division	Khulna; 81 runs	Khulna; 13 runs	Dhaka; 6 wickets		Rajshahi; 167 runs	Khulna; 6 wickets
Rajshahi Division	Rajshahi; 15 runs	Chittagong; 6 wickets	Rajshahi; 2 wickets	Rajshahi; 6 wickets		Rajshahi; 52 runs
Sylhet Division	Sylhet; 6 wickets	Chittagong; 8 wickets	Sylhet; 105 runs	Sylhet; 101 runs	Rajshahi; 6 wickets	
Scorecards

== Other matches ==
Date	Type	Match	Result	Report
12 March 2004	One Day	Bangladesh Under-23 v Zimbabwe A	Zimbabwe A won by 223 wickets	Scorecard
17–19 March 2004	4-Day Match	Bangladesh A v Zimbabwe A	Bangladesh A won by 5 runs	Scorecard
23–26 March 2004	4-Day Match	Bangladesh A v Zimbabwe A	Draw	Scorecard
28 March 2004	One Day	Bangladesh A v Zimbabwe A	Bangladesh A won by 2 runs	Scorecard
30 March 2004	One Day	Bangladesh A v Zimbabwe A	Zimbabwe A won by 5 wickets	Scorecard
2 April 2004	One Day	Bangladesh A v Zimbabwe A	Bangladesh A won by 60 runs	Scorecard
5 April 2004	One Day	Bangladesh A v Zimbabwe A	Zimbabwe A won by 16 runs	Scorecard
6 April 2004	One Day	Bangladesh A v Zimbabwe A	Bangladesh A won by 52 runs	Scorecard

== See also ==
- History of cricket in Bangladesh

== External sources ==
- Miscellaneous articles re Bangladesh cricket
- CricInfo re Bangladesh
- CricketArchive re tournaments in Bangladesh
