= 1999–2000 Bangladeshi cricket season =

The 1999–2000 cricket season in Bangladesh saw the introduction of the National Cricket League, although it did not have first-class status until the 2000–01 season. Internationally, the country hosted tours by the West Indies, England A and Marylebone Cricket Club (MCC) during the 1999–2000 season.

== International tours ==
In October 1999, the West Indies led by Brian Lara played a single first-class match against the Bangladesh national team, which was drawn. The teams also played a two-match series of Limited Overs Internationals (LOI) which West Indies won 2–0.

In October and November, an England A team visited Bangladesh en route to New Zealand and played five matches. Two of these were first-class matches, both being drawn, and one was a List A limited overs match, all three against the national team. England A won the limited overs match by 5 wickets.

In January 2000, Marylebone Cricket Club (MCC) toured the country for three weeks to play five matches including one first-class game against the national team. This was drawn.

The Bangladesh captain in their matches against the touring teams was Aminul Islam.

== National Cricket League launched ==
The National Cricket League was launched with six teams taking part, each representing one of the country's administrative divisions. The teams were:

- Barisal Division
- Chittagong Division
- Dhaka Division
- Khulna Division
- Rajshahi Division
- Sylhet Division

The championship was won by Chittagong, who won seven of their ten matches played.

== See also ==
- History of cricket in Bangladesh
