= Monowar Hossain =

Bangladeshi cricketer (born 1984)

Personal information
- Full name: Monowar Hossain
- Born: 10 July 1984 (age 42); Khulna, Bangladesh

Monowar Hossain (born 10 July 1984 in Khulna, Bangladesh), is a first-class cricketer who has represented Barisal Division, Khulna Division and Chittagong Division since making his debut in the 2008–09 Bangladeshi cricket season.
