= 2001–02 Bangladeshi cricket season =

Bangladeshi sports

The 2001–02 Bangladeshi cricket season featured the inaugural Test series in Bangladesh between Bangladesh and Zimbabwe, followed by a series between Bangladesh and Pakistan.

== International tours ==
=== Zimbabwean cricket team in Bangladesh ===
Bangladesh hosted Zimbabwe for a 2-Test and 3-One Day International tour in November 2001 before travelling to New Zealand in December 2001 for a 2-Test series. Zimbabwe won four out of the five matches, with one of the Test matches resulting in a draw.

=== Pakistani cricket team in Bangladesh ===
Pakistan played 3 first-class matches, including 2 Tests; and 3 One Day Internationals. Pakistan won the Test series convincingly, winning both matches by an innings:

- 1st Test at Bangabandhu National Stadium, Dhaka – Pakistan won by an innings and 178 runs
- 2nd Test at MA Aziz Stadium, Chittagong – Pakistan won by an innings and 169 runs

== Domestic competitions ==
=== Honours ===
	First-class	Limited Overs
National Cricket League Champions	Dhaka Division	Sylhet Division
Most Runs	1012 - (Bangladesh) Minhajul Abedin (Chittagong)	354 - (Bangladesh) Jahangir Alam
Most Wickets	42 - (Bangladesh) Mohammad Rafique (Dhaka)	19 - (Bangladesh) Shafiuddin Ahmed (Chittagong)

=== National Cricket League ===
Team	Pld	W	L	LWF	DWF	DLF	Pts
Dhaka Division	10	9	0	0	0	1	54
Rajshahi Division	10	5	2	1	2	0	36
Chittagong Division	10	2	2	0	5	1	22
Sylhet Division	10	3	3	0	0	4	18
Khulna Division	10	1	3	1	3	2	14
Barisal Division	10	0	8	0	0	2	0

	Barisal Division	Chittagong Division	Dhaka Division	Khulna Division	Rajshahi Division	Sylhet Division
Barisal Division		Chittagong; 197 runs	Dhaka; Innings and 4 runs	Match drawn	Rajshahi; Innings and 123 runs	Sylhet; 153 runs
Chittagong Division	Match drawn		Dhaka; 24 runs	Match drawn	Chittagong; Innings and 14 runs	Match drawn
Dhaka Division	Dhaka; 9 wickets	Match drawn		Dhaka; 10 wickets	Dhaka; 7 wickets	Dhaka; 7 wickets
Khulna Division	Khulna; 6 wickets	Match drawn	Dhaka; 138 runs		Rajshahi; Innings and 29 runs	Sylhet; Innings and 5 runs
Rajshahi Division	Rajshahi; Innings and 11 runs	Rajshahi; 8 wickets	Dhaka; 109 runs	Match drawn		Rajshahi; Innings and 20 runs
Sylhet Division	Sylhet; 49 runs	Match drawn	Dhaka; Innings and 89 runs	Match drawn	Match drawn	
Scorecards

=== National Cricket One-Day League ===
Team	Pld	W	L	NRR	Pts
Sylhet Division	10	8	2	+0.704	16
Chittagong Division	10	7	3	+0.422	14
Rajshahi Division	10	6	4	+0.292	12
Dhaka Division	10	5	5	+0.392	10
Khulna Division	10	4	6	+0.261	8
Barisal Division	10	0	10	-2.039	0

== Other matches ==
27 September 2001 (D/N)
Scorecard

Bangladesh; 152 (40.2 Overs)	v	Bangladesh A 239/9 (50 Overs)
Rafiqul Islam 62 (91); Shabbir Khan 3/26 (10 Overs)		Hannan Sarkar 38 (81); Mohammad Rafique 5/34 (10 Overs)

Bangladesh A won by 87 runs
Bangladesh University of Engineering and Technology
Umpires: Manzur Rahman and Wahid Chowhan

- Bangladesh A won the toss and elected to bat

== See also ==
- History of cricket in Bangladesh
