= Khulna Division cricket team =

Local cricket team in Bangladesh

Khulna Division Cricket Team
Personnel
- Captain: Nurul Hasan

Team information
- Founded: 1999; 27 years ago
- Home ground: Khulna Divisional Stadium
- Capacity: 15,600

History
- NCL wins: 8
- One Day Cricket League wins: 1

The Khulna Division cricket team is a first-class team representing the Khulna Division in south-west Bangladesh, one of the country's eight administrative regions. The team competes in the National Cricket League and National Cricket League Twenty20. They were a participant in the now-defunct National Cricket League One-Day.

While the team originally adopted the name Kings of Khulna for the inaugural NCL T20 season in 2010, it returned to the format under the divisional name for the 2024–25 NCL T20 revival. Khulna played in black and yellow. The equivalent team in the Bangladesh Premier League (BPL) is the Khulna Tigers.

Khulna's main home ground is the Khulna Divisional Stadium in Khulna city, which has a capacity of 15,000.

Khulna have won the NCL a record eight times, including the three consecutive seasons 2015–16, 2016–17, and 2017–18, and they won the 2002–03 National Cricket League One-Day.

== Honours ==
- National Cricket League (8) – 2002–03, 2007–08, 2012–13, 2015–16, 2016–17, 2017–18, 2019–20, 2026-27
- One-Day Cricket League (1) – 2002–03

== Seasons ==
| Season | NCL | One-Day | NCL T20 |
|---|---|---|---|
| 1999–2000 | 4th | | |
| 2000–01 | 4th | | |
| 2001–02 | 5th | 5th | |
| 2002–03 | 1st | 1st | |
| 2003–04 | 3rd | 3rd | |
| 2004–05 | 3rd | 3rd | |
| 2005–06 | 6th | 6th | |
| 2006–07 | 6th | 6th | |
| 2007–08 | 1st | 3rd | |
| 2008–09 | 3rd | 4th | |
| 2009–10 | 4th | not held | Runners Up |
| 2010–11 | 5th | 4th | |
| 2011–12 | 2nd | | |
| 2012–13 | 1st | | |
| 2013–14 | 4th | | |
| 2014–15 | 2nd | | |
| 2015–16 | 1st | | |
| 2016–17 | 1st | | |
| 2017–18 | 1st | | |
| 2018–19 | 3rd | | |
| 2019–20 | 1st | | |
| 2020–21 | Postponed due to Covid-19 | | |
| 2021–22 | 4th | | |
| 2022–23 | 7th | | |
| 2023–24 | 6th | | |
| 2024–25 | 5th | | 3rd |
| 2025–26 | 4th | | 2nd |
| 2026–27 | 1st | | |

== Current squad ==
As of September 2026, the squad for the 2026–27 season.

| Name | Nat | Batting style | Bowling style | Notes |
Batsman
| Anamul Haque | (Bangladesh) | Right-handed bat | Right arm medium | |
| Mohammad Mithun | (Bangladesh) | Right-hand bat | Right-arm off break | Captain |
| Azizul Hakim Tamim | (Bangladesh) | Left-handed bat | Right-arm off break | |
| Kalam Siddiki | (Bangladesh) | Right-hand bat | Right-arm off break | |
Wicketkeeper
| Nurul Hasan | (Bangladesh) | Right-hand bat | — | |
| Imran Uzzaman | (Bangladesh) | Right-hand bat | — | |
All-Rounders
| Afif Hossain | (Bangladesh) | Left-hand bat | Right-arm off break | |
| Samiun Basir | (Bangladesh) | Left-hand bat | Slow left-arm orthodox | |
| Nahidul Islam | (Bangladesh) | Right-hand bat | Right-arm off break | |
Bowlers
| Parvez Rahman Jibon | (Bangladesh) | Right-hand bat | Right-arm off break | |
| Tipu Sultan | (Bangladesh) | Left-hand bat | Slow left-arm orthodox | |
| Sofor Ali | (Bangladesh) | Right-hand bat | Right-arm medium-fast | |
| Abdul Halim | (Bangladesh) | Right-hand bat | Right-arm medium-fast | |
| Mehedi Hasan Rana | (Bangladesh) | Left-hand bat | Left-arm fast-medium | |
| Rakib Howlader | (Bangladesh) | Right-hand bat | Slow left-arm orthodox | |

== Venues ==
Until 2004 Khulna used Shamsul Huda Stadium in Jessore for its home matches. Since then it has played most of its home matches at Khulna Divisional Stadium in Khulna, which is now also a Test venue.

== Records ==
By late November 2026, Khulna Division had played 202 first-class matches, with 66 wins, 51 losses and 85 draws.

=== Highest team scores ===
| Total | Opponent | Venue | Result | Season |
|---|---|---|---|---|
| 618/8d | Dhaka Metropolis | Fatullah | Draw | 2011–12 |
| 600/9d | Dhaka Division | Fatullah | Draw | 2014–15 |
| 560/6d | Rajshahi Division | Mirpur | Win | 2014–15 |

=== Lowest team scores ===
| Total | Opponent | Venue | Result | Season |
|---|---|---|---|---|
| 64 | Dhaka Metropolis | BKSP | Loss | 2022-23 |
| 67 | Dhaka Division | Dhanmondi | Loss | 2003–04 |
| 91 | Dhaka Division | Mirpur | Loss | 2024–25 |

=== Most runs in an innings ===
| Total | Batsman | Opponent | Venue | Result | Season |
|---|---|---|---|---|---|
| 216 | Anamul Haque | Rangpur Division | Khulna | Draw | 2017-18 |
| 203* | Tushar Imran | Rajshahi Division | Mirpur | Win | 2014-15 |
| 202* | Imrul Kayes | Rangpur Division | Khulna | Draw | 2019-20 |

=== Best bowling in an innings ===
| Total | Bowler | Opponent | Venue | Result | Season |
|---|---|---|---|---|---|
| 9/84 | Abdur Razzak | Chattogram Division | Bogra | Win | 2012–13 |
| 9/91 | Abdur Razzak | Dhaka Metropolis | Cox's Bazar | Win | 2013–14 |
| 8/10 | Mahedi Hasan | Barishal Division | Khulna | Win | 2023–24 |

Abdur Razzak also has the best match figures of 15 for 193 (8 for 123 and 7 for 70), against Barishal Division in 2011–12.

== Other sources ==
- Wisden Cricketers Almanack (annual): various issues
