= 2002–03 Bangladeshi cricket season =

The 2002–03 Bangladeshi cricket season featured Bangladesh playing their inaugural Test series against the touring West Indies. It was followed by Bangladesh's first home series against South Africa.

== International tours ==
=== West Indian cricket team in Bangladesh ===
The West Indies played two Test matches and three limited overs internationals. They won both the Test matches and two of the One Day Internationals, while the remaining ODI was a no result, as rain arrived to save Bangladesh from what looked like another likely defeat.

=== South African cricket team in Bangladesh ===
South Africa played 2 Test matches against Bangladesh and took part in a limited overs tri-series with Bangladesh and India. South Africa won the Test series against Bangladesh, winning both matches convincingly by an innings. The final of the tri-series resulted with the abandonment of the match after the first innings.

== Domestic competitions ==
=== Honours ===
	First-class	Limited Overs
National Cricket League Champions	Khulna Division	Khulna Division
Most Runs	447 - (Bangladesh) Sajjadul Hasan (Khulna)	257 - (Bangladesh) Mohammad Salim (Khulna)
Most Wickets	35 - (Bangladesh) Ahsanullah Hasan (Chittagong)	18 - (Bangladesh) Manjural Islam (Khulna)

=== National Cricket League ===
Team	Pld	W	L	LWF	DWF	DLF	Pts
Khulna Division	5	3	0	0	1	1	14
Chittagong Division	5	3	0	0	1	1	14
Dhaka Division	5	3	0	0	1	1	14
Rajshahi Division	5	2	3	0	0	0	8
Barisal Division	5	0	4	0	1	0	2
Sylhet Division	5	0	4	0	0	1	0

	Barisal Division	Chittagong Division	Dhaka Division	Khulna Division	Rajshahi Division	Sylhet Division
Barisal Division		Chittagong; 10 wickets		Khulna; 4 wickets	Rajshahi; 3 wickets	Match drawn
Chittagong Division				Match drawn	Chittagong; Innings and 8 runs	Chittagong; 46 runs
Dhaka Division	Dhaka; 3 wickets	Match drawn		Match drawn	Dhaka; 8 wickets	Dhaka; 4 wickets
Khulna Division					Khulna; 9 wickets	Khulna; 1 wickets
Rajshahi Division						Rajshahi; 10 wickets
Sylhet Division						
Scorecards

==== Play-off ====
20–23 January 2003
Scorecard

Dhaka Division	v	Chittagong Division
295 (96.1 overs)		197 (67.5 overs)
215 (91.5 overs)		200 (61.4 overs)

Dhaka Division won by 113 runs
Dhanmondi Cricket Stadium, Dhaka

==== Final ====
26–29 January 2003
Scorecard

Dhaka Division	v	Khulna Division
362(96.4 overs)		338 (99.1 overs)
196 (67.1 overs)		223/7 (76.4 overs)

Khulna Division won by 3 wickets
Bangabandhu National Stadium, Dhaka

=== National Cricket One Day League ===
Team	Pld	W	L	NRR	Pts
Khulna Division	5	4	1	+0.944	8
Dhaka Division	5	4	1	+0.215	8
Sylhet Division	5	3	2	+0.641	6
Rajshahi Division	5	3	2	+0.512	6
Chittagong Division	5	1	4	-1.053	2
Barisal Division	5	0	5	-1.348	0

	Barisal Division	Chittagong Division	Dhaka Division	Khulna Division	Rajshahi Division	Sylhet Division
Barisal Division		Chittagong; 7 wickets		Khulna; 68 runs	Rajshahi; 7 wickets	Sylhet; 40 runs
Chittagong Division				Khulna; 4 wickets	Rajshahi; 6 wickets	Sylhet; 8 wickets
Dhaka Division	Dhaka; 5 wickets	Dhaka; 1 wicket		Dhaka; 7 wickets	Rajshahi; 7 wickets	Dhaka; 2 wickets
Khulna Division					Khulna; 24 runs	Khulna; 71 runs
Rajshahi Division						Sylhet; 20 runs
Sylhet Division						
Scorecards

==== Final ====
30 January 2003
Scorecard

Dhaka Division; 236 (49.1 overs)	v	Khulna Division; 55 (23.3 overs)

Dhaka Division won by 181 runs
Bangabandhu National Stadium, Dhaka
Player of the match: Anwar Hossain (Dhaka)

- Dhaka Division won the toss and elected to bat

== Other matches ==
Date	Type	Match	Result	Report
25–28 October 2002	4-Day Match	Bangladesh A v BCB Development Squad	Bangladesh A won by 7 wickets	Scorecard
4–7 November 2002	4-Day Match	Bangladesh v Bangladesh A	Draw	Scorecard
9–12 November 2002	4-Day Match	Bangladesh v BCB Development Squad	Bangladesh won by 10 wickets	Scorecard
15–18 November 2002	4-Day Match	Bangladesh v Bangladesh A	Draw	Scorecard

== See also ==
- History of cricket in Bangladesh
