= Sylhet Division cricket team =

Bangladeshi first-class team

Sylhet Division Cricket Team
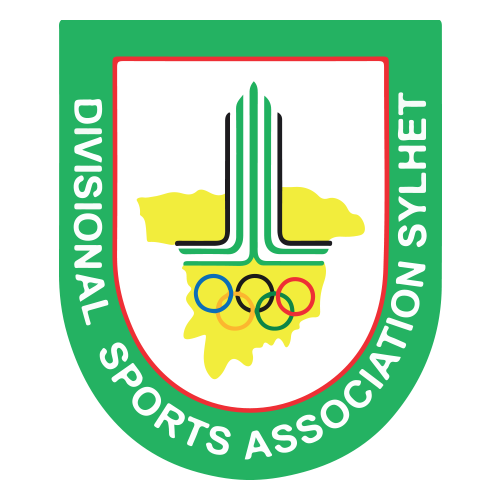

Personnel
- Captain: Zakir Hasan
- Coach: Rajin Saleh

Team information
- Colours: Green and Blue
- Founded: 1999
- Home ground: Sylhet International Cricket Stadium
- Capacity: 18,500

History
- NCL wins: 1
- One Day Cricket League wins: 1
- NCL T20 wins: 0

The Sylhet Division Cricket Team is a Bangladeshi first-class team representing Sylhet Division, one of the country's eight administrative regions. The team competes in the National Cricket League (NCL) and the National Cricket League Twenty20 (NCL T20), and previously participated in the now-defunct National Cricket League One-Day tournament.

During the NCL T20 2009–10 season, the team adopted the name Sultans of Sylhet and played in yellow and blue colors. However, with the tournament's restart after long break in 2024, the team decided to drop the "Sultans of Sylhet" name and continue competing under their original divisional name.

Sylhet is also represented by the Sylhet Strikers in the Bangladesh Premier League (BPL).

Sylhet’s home ground, the Sylhet International Cricket Stadium, holds 13,500 spectators and is a landmark of the city. In 2024, Sylhet ended their long wait for silverware by winning their first-ever National Cricket League (NCL) title, the country’s top First-Class competition. This historic victory marked the end of a trophy drought that stretched all the way back to their inaugural National One-Day League win in 2001–02.

== History ==
Sylhet Division has a long and storied history in cricket, dating back to the time when it was part of British India. The first-ever recorded cricket match in the Indian subcontinent was played in Sylhet, History of Cricket in Sylhet marking the region's early involvement in the sport.

Despite its historical significance, the Sylhet Division cricket team struggled in Bangladesh's First-Class (FC) competitions, National Cricket League (NCL), for much of its existence. The team faced difficulties in competing at the highest level and was often near the bottom of the standings. However, Sylhet achieved notable success in limited-overs formats, notably winning the inaugural One Day league in 2001. Afterward, the team performed moderately well before the league was eventually defunct.

In the late 2000s, the team transitioned to the T20 format, playing their first NCL T20 under the name "Sultan of Sylhet." With their mediocre performance, Sylhet continued to feature in the NCL, often finishing at or near the bottom of the standings until the 2019-20 season.

A turning point came with the emergence of a powerful pace bowling attack, featuring the likes of Ebadot Hossain, Khaled Ahmed, Tanzim Sakib, and veteran Abu Jayed. This bowling quartet, regarded as the best in the country’s history, played a pivotal role in Sylhet's revival. The 2019-20 season saw Sylhet finish first in NCL Tier 2, securing promotion to Tier 1 for the first time in the team’s history, signaling the start of a new era.

In the 2021-22 season, following the COVID-19 hiatus, Sylhet continued its ascent, finishing third in the standings. Over the next two seasons, the team proved to be one of the most competitive in the league, claiming runners-up positions in both. These performances highlighted the team's transformation into a formidable force in domestic cricket.

Sylhet's crowning achievement came in the 2024-25 season, when the team ended a 24-year trophy drought by winning their first-ever NCL title. This victory, along with their earlier ODI league win in 2001, marked the team’s second major domestic title. The success was largely driven by the team's exceptional pace attack, with Khaled, Ebadot, Tanzim Sakib, Rezaur, and Rahi forming a dominant and highly effective bowling unit. Their performances were so impressive that other teams sought to borrow their pacers for domestic competitions.

Team captain Amite Hasan was a contributor to Sylhet. As the league's top scorer in the 2024-25 season, he was part of the team's win. While batting depth is noted as an area of concern, the pace attack has led to Sylhet winning more games in domestic cricket.

Sylhet has also produced several notable players who have represented Bangladesh on the international stage. In the early 2000s, players such as Alok Kapali, Rajin Saleh, Enamul Haque Jr., Tapolas Baishya, and Najmul Hossain were key members of the Bangladesh national team, showcasing the region's cricketing talent. However, after 2007-08, the production of top-tier cricketers from Sylhet declined, resulting in a period of stagnation.

The recent emergence of Zakir Hasan, who has established himself in the Bangladesh Test team, along with Jaker Ali, Tanzim Sakib, and Nasum Ahmed, has rejuvenated the region’s cricketing reputation. With several current players regularly featuring for Bangladesh, Sylhet continues to make its mark on the national cricket scene.

From a period of struggle to a period of resurgence, the history of the Sylhet Division Cricket Team reflects the development of a competitive side, particularly with the emergence of a strong pace attack. The team’s recent success in winning the NCL title in the 2024-25 season represents a significant milestone in the region's cricketing history.

== Honours ==
- National Cricket League (1) – 2024–25
- One-Day Cricket League (1) – 2001–02

== Seasons ==
Season	NCL	One-Day	NCL T20
1999-2000	2nd		
2000-01	7th		
2001-02	6th	1st	
2002-03	6th	3rd	
2003-04	2nd	4th	
2004-05	5th	4th	
2005-06	5th	4th	
2006-07	5th	3rd	
2007-08	6th	4th	
2008-09	6th	6th	
2009-10	6th	not held	2nd
2010-11	3rd	6th	
2011-12	3rd		
2012-13	5th		
2013-14	5th		
2014-15	6th		
2015-16	4th in Tier 2 (8th)		
2016-17	3rd in Tier 2 (7th)		
2017-18	2d in Tier 2 (6th)		
2018-19	4th in Tier 2 (8th)		
2019-20	1st in Tier 2 (5th)		
2020-21	Tournament Cancelled due to Covid		
2021-22	3rd in Tier 1(3rd)		
2022-23	Runners-up		
2023-24	Runners-up		
2024-25	Champions		

== Current squad ==
Sylhet Division Cricket Team
Player	Age	Batting	Bowling	Role
Zakir Hasan	24y 249d	Left-handed	N/A	Wicketkeeper Batter
Asadulla Al Galib	23y 286d	Right-handed	Right-arm Offbreak	Batter
Abu Jayed	29y 67d	Right-handed	Right-arm Fast-medium	Bowler
Nabil Samad	35y 364d	Left-handed	Slow Left-arm Orthodox	Bowler
Tanzim Hasan Sakib	19y 353d	Right-handed	Right-arm Fast-medium	Bowler
Abu Bakkar	20y 234d	Right-handed	Right-arm Offbreak	Bowler
Amite Hasan (C)	21y 23d	Right-handed	N/A	Batter
Imtiaz Hossain	37y 226d	Right-handed	Right-arm Offbreak	Batter
Mizanur Rahman Sayem	26y 288d	Right-handed	N/A	Batter
Mohiuddin Tareq	18y 328d	Right-handed	Right-arm Medium	Bowler
Naeem Ahmed	24y 151d	Right-handed	Right-arm Offbreak	Bowler
Rahatul Ferdous	27y 3d	Left-handed	Slow Left-arm Orthodox	Bowler
Shahanur Rahman	26y 166d	Right-handed	Right-arm Offbreak	Bowler
Tawfique Khan	31y 118d	Right-handed	Legbreak Googly	Bowler

== Records ==
=== Most Runs in First-class Matches ===
Most Runs in First-class Matches - Sylhet Division
Player	Span	Mat	Inns	NO	Runs	HS	Ave	BF	SR	100	50	0	4s	6s
Imtiaz Hossain	2002–2023	142	255	9	6890	154	28.00	13428	51.31	11	27	24	831	80
Alok Kapali	2002–2021	108	178	7	6109	211*	35.72	11887	51.39	13	24	6	695	60
Rajin Saleh	2002–2018	96	162	12	5957	201*	39.71	15235	39.10	14	34	16	665	55
Golam Mabud	2002–2012	76	139	10	3715	123	28.79	8549	43.45	4	22	12	463	26
Golam Rahman	2003–2012	64	117	5	3274	160	29.23	7558	43.31	5	16	9	408	17
Zakir Hasan	2015–2023	41	68	1	2809	213	41.92	5362	52.38	7	13	4	293	18

== Notable players ==
The following is a list of players who have played for both Sylhet and Bangladesh.

- Abul Hasan
- Alok Kapali
- Aminul Islam Bulbul
- Anisur Rahman
- Athar Ali Khan
- Dhiman Ghosh
- Enamul Haque
- Farhad Reza
- Faruk Ahmed
- Golam Faruq
- Hasibul Hossain
- Mashrafe Mortaza
- Mohammad Rafique
- Moniruzzaman
- Mosharrof Hossain
- Mushfiqur Rahim
- Nadif Chowdhury
- Nasir Ahmed
- Nazmul Hossain
- Nazmus Sadat
- Niamur Rashid
- Rajin Saleh
- Robiul Islam
- Tapash Baisya

Sylhet players who have played for countries other than Bangladesh:

- (Sri Lanka) Indika de Saram
- (Pakistan) Faisal Iqbal
- (Sri Lanka) Kaushalya Weeraratne
