= 2004–05 Bangladeshi cricket season =

The 2004–05 Bangladeshi cricket season featured Bangladesh's inaugural home Test series against New Zealand. The season also featured tours by India and Zimbabwe. The Bangladesh teams claimed their first test series victory in this season against Zimbabwe.

== International tours ==
=== New Zealand Cricket team in Bangladesh ===
New Zealand played 2 Test matches and 3 one day internationals (ODI) against Bangladesh in October 2004. New Zealand won both the Test matches and won all three ODIs.

=== Indian Cricket team in Bangladesh ===
India played 2 Test matches and 3 one day internationals (ODI) against Bangladesh in December 2004. India won both the Test matches and won the ODI series 2–1.

=== Zimbabwe Cricket team in Bangladesh ===
Zimbabwe played 2 Test matches and 5 one day internationals (ODI) against Bangladesh in January 2005. Bangladesh won both the Test series 1–0 and also won all ODI series 3–2.

== Domestic competitions ==
=== Honours ===
	First-class	Limited Overs
National Cricket League Champions	Dhaka Division	Rajshahi Division
Most Runs	825 – (Bangladesh) Golam Rahman (Sylhet)	340 – (Bangladesh) Farhad Reza (Rajshahi)
Most Wickets	76 – (Bangladesh) Alamgir Kabir (Rajshahi)	17 – (Bangladesh) Manjural Islam (Khulna)

=== National Cricket League ===
Team	Pld	W	L	DWF	DTF	DLF	ND	Pts
Dhaka Division	10	4	0	3	1	1	1	43
Rajshahi Division	10	4	2	4	0	0	0	40
Khulna Division	10	2	2	2	0	4	0	28
Chittagong Division	10	2	3	2	1	2	0	22
Barisal Division	10	2	4	1	0	3	0	22
Sylhet Division	10	0	3	2	0	4	1	18

	Barisal Division	Chittagong Division	Dhaka Division	Khulna Division	Rajshahi Division	Sylhet Division
Barisal Division		Barisal; 5 wickets	Dhaka; Innings and 53 runs	Barisal; 260 runs	Rajshahi; 9 wickets	Match drawn
Chittagong Division	Match drawn		Dhaka; Innings & 2 runs	Chittagong; 9 wickets	Rajshahi; 5 wickets	Chittagong; Innings & 64 runs
Dhaka Division	Match drawn	Match drawn		Match drawn	Dhaka; 3 wickets	Match drawn
Khulna Division	Khulna; 4 wickets	Match drawn	Match drawn		Match drawn	Match drawn
Rajshahi Division	Rajshahi; 5 wickets	Match drawn	Rajshahi; 4 wickets	Match drawn		Match drawn
Sylhet Division	Match drawn	Match drawn	Match drawn	Khulna; 7 wickets	Rajshahi; 9 wickets	
Scorecards
