= Kamrul Islam Imon =

Bangladeshi cricketer (born 1986)

Imon
Personal information
- Full name: Mohammad Kamrul Islam
- Born: 31 July 1986 (age 40); Dhaka, Bangladesh
- Batting: Right-handed
- Bowling: Right-arm off break
- Role: Batsman, Bowler

Mohammad Kamrul Islam (born 31 July 1986, in Dhaka), generally known as "Imon", is a Bangladeshi first-class and List A cricketer. He is a right-handed batsman and a right-arm off break bowler. He made his debut for Dhaka Division in the 2005–06 season. He has represented his country in under-19 one day international matches.
