= Dhaka Division cricket team =

Bangladeshi cricket team

Personnel
- Captain: Mahidul Islam Ankon

Team information
- Founded: 1999
- Home ground: Sher-e-Bangla National Cricket Stadium

History
- NCL wins: 5
- One Day Cricket League wins: 2

The Dhaka Division cricket team is a Bangladeshi first-class team representing the Dhaka Division, one of the seven administrative regions in Bangladesh. The team competes in the National Cricket League. They play most of their home games at the Sher-e-Bangla National Cricket Stadium in Dhaka.The equivalent team in the Bangladesh Premier League (BPL) is the Dhaka Capitals.

== Honours ==
- National Cricket League (5) – 2001–02, 2003–04, 2004–05, 2006–07, 2013–14
- One-Day Cricket League (2) – 2006–07, 2009–10

== National Cricket League record ==
Dhaka Division is one of the eight teams (formerly six) in the first-class National Cricket League of Bangladesh.

Season	Position	Record	Comments
2000–01	8th	P6 W0 D1 L5	Combined first-class and one-day tournament. Dhaka finished fourth and last in their group, and had the lowest point total of all eight teams competing.
2001–02	1st	P10 W9 D1 L0	
2002–03	2nd	P7 W4 D2 L1	Following the five-match league stage Dhaka won a play-off match against Chittagong Division, before losing the final to Khulna Division
2003–04	1st	P10 W5 D4 L1	Same number of points as Sylhet Division, won the title on runs per wicket
2004–05	1st	P10 W4 D6 L0	
2005–06	4th	P10 W3 D3 L4	
2006–07	1st	P10 W3 D6 L1	
2007–08	3rd	P10 W4 D5 L1	
2008–09	4th	P10 W3 D4 L3	
2009–10	3rd	P8 W3 D3 L2	
2010–11	2nd	P9 W2 D6 L1	Finished second to Rajshahi Division, then lost the final to Rajshahi on the first innings
2011–12	8th	P7 W0 D1 L6	
2012–13	2nd	P7 W5 D1 L1	
2013–14	1st	P7 W5 D1 L1	
2014–15	3rd	P7 W4 D3 L0	
2015–16	3rd in Tier 1	P6 W1 D4 L1	
2016–17	2nd in Tier 1	P6 W2 D4 L0	
2017–18	equal 3rd in Tier 1	P6 W0 D5 L1	

== Venues ==
Dhaka Division plays its home matches primarily at the Sher-e-Bangla National Cricket Stadium and the Shaheed Ria Gope Cricket Stadium. As the most prominent division in the National Cricket League, the team has used several international-standard facilities and regional stadiums across the Dhaka region.

Dhaka Division home ground locations

Stadium	Location	Details
National Stadium	Dhaka	Also known as Dhaka Stadium. It was the primary venue for all cricket in Bangladesh until 2005.
Dhanmondi Cricket Stadium	Dhaka	Also known as Abahani Ground. It frequently hosted domestic league matches.
Sher-e-Bangla National Cricket Stadium	Mirpur, Dhaka	Also known as Dhaka (Mirpur). The "Home of Cricket" in Bangladesh and the primary venue for Dhaka Division's major fixtures since 2006.
Shaheed Ria Gope Cricket Stadium	Fatullah	An international venue in Narayanganj that serves as a major secondary home for the division.
Faridpur Stadium	Faridpur	A regional multi-purpose stadium used for first-class matches to promote the game within the division's districts.
District Stadium, Mymensingh	Mymensingh	Formerly known as the Rafiq Uddin Bhuiyan Stadium, it has a long history of hosting National Cricket League matches.
BKSP Grounds	Savar	The grounds at the Bangladesh Krira Shikkha Protisthan (national sports institute) are staples for First-class and List A domestic cricket.
