= 1998–99 Bangladeshi cricket season =

For the first time since independence in 1971, first-class cricket was played in Bangladesh in the 1998–99 season.

Bangladesh hosted the 1998 ICC KnockOut Trophy (known as the Wills International Cup) during October and November, although it being for Test nations only they could not play themselves but provided a neutral venue. South Africa won the tournament.

During November, the West Indies A team visited and having played three List A matches against Bangladesh, starting on 12 November the two teams played the first-ever first-class match in Bangladesh (i.e., since independence). West Indies A won by 8 wickets.

The final of the 1998–99 Asian Test Championship was played at Dhaka in March 1999, Pakistan winning by an innings and 175 runs against Sri Lanka. Later that month, Bangladesh hosted Kenya and Zimbabwe for the List A Meril International Tournament, won convincingly by Zimbabwe.

Domestic cricket was still of minor standard because Bangladesh had not yet achieved ICC Full Member status until June 2000. The Dhaka Premier Division was again the main club-level tournament but there were two competitions organised on a national level which presaged the future National Cricket League being launched in November 1999.

== See also ==
- History of cricket in Bangladesh
