= Bangladesh Krira Shikkha Protisthan cricket grounds =

Cricket grounds

Coordinates: 23°59′26.58″N 90°15′6.51″E

- Interactive map of Bangladesh Krira Shikkha Protisthan cricket grounds
- Location: Savar, Dhaka
- Country: Bangladesh
- Establishment: 1989
- Owner: Bangladesh Cricket Board
- Tenants: Bangladesh

There are four cricket grounds at the Bangladesh Krira Shikkha Protisthan (BKSP) national sports institute in Savar, Dhaka. As well as serving the needs of the BKSP's students, the grounds have also staged first-class and List A cricket matches in Bangladeshi domestic competitions since 2000, and several minor international matches.

== History ==
The No 1 Ground was the first of the four grounds to be developed and the first to be used for Bangladeshi domestic competitions in 2000. The facilities at the other three grounds have been upgraded in recent years with the help of the Bangladesh Cricket Board. Grounds 2, 3 and 4 are now regularly used for first-class and List A cricket. They serve as neutral venues in domestic competitions.

== BKSP No 1 Ground ==
Situated on the right just inside the main entrance to the BKSP complex, the Bangladesh Krira Shikkha Protisthan No 1 Ground has been in operation since the late 1980s. It first staged matches in the Dhaka Premier Division senior limited-overs tournament in 1996. Its first international matches came in 1998: three warm-up matches for the Wills International Cup.

The first first-class matches were played here in the National Cricket League in 2000–01, when the ground served as the home ground for Biman Bangladesh Airlines. The last first-class matches so far were in 2009–10. Bangladesh A also played first-class matches at the ground against the touring Pakistan cricket team in 2001–02, and Sri Lanka A in 2005–06. The first List A matches were four in the one-day National Cricket League in 2000–01. The last were in 2008–09.

In all, the ground has staged 10 first-class and 10 List A matches.

== BKSP No 2 Ground ==
Bangladesh Krira Shikkha Protisthan No 2 Ground
- Interactive map of Bangladesh Krira Shikkha Protisthan No 2 Ground

Ground information
- Location: Savar, Dhaka
- Country: Bangladesh

International information
- First women's ODI: 17 November 2011: Pakistan v West Indies
- Last women's ODI: 26 November 2011: Bangladesh v Ireland
- As of 2 September 2020; Source: CricketArchive

The other three grounds are located further inside the BKSP complex. Apart from matches in the major domestic competitions, all of the grounds are in constant use for minor matches.

The Bangladesh Krira Shikkha Protisthan No 2 Ground hosted its first domestic first-class and List A matches in 2006. Bangladesh A also played two first-class matches there in 2010. Up to the end of the 2014–15 season the ground had staged 19 first-class, 21 List A and three Twenty20 matches. In 2011 it also held three matches in the qualifying series for the Women's Cricket World Cup.

== BKSP No 3 Ground ==
Bangladesh Krira Shikkha Protisthan No 3 Ground
- Interactive map of Bangladesh Krira Shikkha Protisthan No 3 Ground

Ground information
- Location: Savar, Dhaka
- Country: Bangladesh

International information
- First women's ODI: 14 November 2011: Ireland v West Indies
- Last women's ODI: 24 November 2011: Ireland v Netherlands
- As of 2 September 2020; Source: CricketArchive

The No 3 and No 4 grounds, situated side by side, share their facilities. Each has a crowd capacity of about 2000. At first, when the List A Dhaka Premier Division Cricket League was played at the grounds in 2013–14, the standard of the facilities received some criticism from the players.

The Bangladesh Krira Shikkha Protisthan No 3 Ground has been used for domestic first-class and especially List A cricket since 2013–14. It is one of the principal grounds used in the Dhaka Premier League. Up to the end of the 2016–17 season the ground had staged 17 first-class and 99 List A matches. In 2011 it also held two matches in the qualifying series for the Women's World Cup.

In 2013–14, Rajshahi Division, batting first, lost their first six wickets for 77 but finished by declaring at 675 for 9. Farhad Reza scored 259. In 2014–15, Mosaddek Hossain made 250 on the No 3 Ground, then scored 282 on the No 2 Ground five days later. Shuvagata Hom equalled the National League record when he took six catches in the match for Dhaka Division against Chittagong Division at the ground in 2014–15.

In September 2015 the BKSP 3 & 4 grounds hosted the ICRC International T20 Cricket Tournament for people with physical disabilities.

== BKSP No 4 Ground ==
The Bangladesh Krira Shikkha Protisthan No 4 Ground has staged two first-class matches in 2013–14 and one in 2016–17, and 36 List A matches. It was one of the three grounds chosen for the 2016–17 Dhaka Premier Division, when it staged 27 List A matches.

In the first first-class match at the ground, in the National Cricket League, Dhaka Division, batting first, made 756 for 5 declared, the National League record total, four batsmen scoring centuries. The match ended in a draw when Rajshahi Division, set 607 to win, finished on 272 for 9 after their last-wicket pair held out for the last 8.2 overs.
