= National Cricket League One-Day =

National Cricket League
- Countries: Bangladesh
- Administrator: Bangladesh Cricket Board
- Format: List A cricket
- First edition: 2000–01
- Latest edition: 2010–11
- Number of teams: 8
- Most successful: Rajshahi Division (3 titles)
- Most runs: Faisal Hossain (669)
- Most wickets: Suhrawadi Shuvo (37)

The National Cricket League One-Day was the principal domestic limited overs cricket competition in Bangladesh from 2000–01 until 2010–11. It has since been superseded by the Dhaka Premier Division competition, which gained List A status in the 2013–14 season.

== One-Day Cricket League Winners ==
- 2000–01 – Biman Bangladeshi Airlines (1/1)
- 2001–02 – Sylhet Division (1/1)
- 2002–03 – Khulna Division (1/1)
- 2003–04 – Chittagong Division (1/1)
- 2004–05 – Rajshahi Division (1/3)
- 2005–06 – Rajshahi Division (2/2)
- 2006–07 – Dhaka Division (1/2)
- 2007–08 – Rajshahi Division (3/3)
- 2008–09 – Barisal Division (1/1)
- 2010–11 – Dhaka Division (2/2)
