= Muminul Islam =

Bangladeshi cricketer (born 1997)

Personal information
- Full name: Md Muminul Islam
- Born: 1 January 1997 (age 29)
- Batting: Right-handed
- Bowling: Right-arm medium
- Source: ESPNcricinfo, 4 December 2020

Muminul Islam (born 1 January 1997) is a Bangladeshi cricketer. He made his first-class debut for Sylhet Division in the 2018–19 National Cricket League on 29 October 2018.
