= Barisal Division cricket team =

Bangladeshi cricket team

Barishal Division Cricket Team
Personnel
- Captain: Sohag Gazi

Team information
- Founded: 1999
- Home ground: Barisal Divisional Stadium
- Capacity: 30,000

History
- NCL wins: 0
- One Day Cricket League wins: 1

The Barisal Division cricket team or Barisal Blazers is a Bangladeshi first-class team representing the Barisal Division, one of the eight administrative regions in Bangladesh. The team competes in the National Cricket League and was formerly a participant in the now-defunct National Cricket League One-Day. While the team originally adopted the name Barisal Blazers for the inaugural NCL T20 season in 2010, it returned to the format under the divisional name for the 2024–25 NCL T20 revival. Barisal played in their official green and black colors. The equivalent team in the Bangladesh Premier League (BPL) is the Fortune Barishal.

Barisal's home ground is the Barisal Divisional Stadium which has a 30,000 capacity. They have only won one competition in their history, the 2008–09 National Cricket League One-Day.

== Honours ==
- National Cricket League (0) –
- One-Day Cricket League (1) – 2008–09

== Summary by season ==
Season	NCL	One-Day	NCL T20
1999-2000	6th		
2000-01	6th		
2001-02	6th	6th	
2002-03	5th	6th	
2003-04	6th	6th	
2004-05	5th	6th	
2004-05	3rd	5th	
2006-07	4th	4th	
2007-08	5th	5th	
2008-09	2nd	1st	
2009-10	5th	not held	6th
2010-11	4th	2nd	
2011-12	7th		
2012-13	8th		
2013-14	8th		
2014-15	7th		
2015-16	1st in Tier 2		
2016-17	3rd in Tier 1		
2017-18	3rd in Tier 1		
2018-19	4th in Tier 1		
2019-20	3rd in Tier 2		
2020-21	abandoned due to COVID-19 pandemic		
2021-22	2nd in Tier 2		
2022-23	4th in Tier 2		
2023-24	4th in Tier 2		
2024-25	8th		8th

At the end of the 2024–25 season, Barisal Division had played 178 first-class matches, with 27 wins, 79 losses and 72 draws.

== Notable players ==
The following is a list of players who have played for both Barisal and Bangladesh.

- Anisur Rahman
- Habibul Bashar
- Hannan Sarkar
- Harunur Rashid
- Javed Omar
- Mafizur Rahman
- Mazharul Haque
- Mohammad Sharif
- Moniruzzaman
- Mosharraf Hossain
- Nadif Chowdhury
- Nasir Hossain
- Nazimuddin
- Ranjan Das
- Raqibul Hasan
- Robiul Islam
- Sajidul Islam
- Sanwar Hossain
- Shahriar Nafees
- Sohag Gazi
- Syed Rasel
- Talha Jubair
- Ziaur Rahman

Barisal players who have played for countries other than Bangladesh:

- (Sri Lanka) Jeevantha Kulatunga

== See also ==
- National Cricket League of Bangladesh

== Other source ==
- Wisden Cricketers Almanack (annual)
