= 2011–12 Bangladeshi cricket season =

The 2011–12 Bangladeshi cricket season is when the number of the National Cricket League (NCL) championship teams increased from six to eight. Following creation of Rangpur Division in January 2010 as the country's seventh administrative region, the NCL in 2011–12 was expanded to eight teams with the introduction of the Rangpur team and the return of Dhaka Metropolis, although they had no settled home venue. Rajshahi Division won the championship title in the fourth consecutive season. The One Day League was formally terminated before the season began and the main List A limited overs competition since then is the Dhaka Premier Division, which began in 2013–14. The Bangladesh Premier League (BPL) was founded in 2011–12 season and Dhaka Gladiators were its first champions.

== Honours ==
- National Cricket League – Rajshahi Division
- Bangladesh Premier League – Dhaka Gladiators
- Most runs – Anamul Haque (Khulna) 816 @ 42.94
- Most wickets – Enamul Haque (Sylhet) 59 @ 22.52

== International cricket ==
The West Indies toured Bangladesh in October 2011 and playing two Test matches, the West Indies winning the second, the first being a drawn game. West Indies played three limited overs internationals, winning the series 2–1. Bangladesh won a T20I by 3 wickets.

Pakistan toured from 29 November to 21 December 2011, playing one Twenty20 International (T20I), three One Day Internationals (ODIs) and two Test matches, Pakistan winning all matches.

== See also ==
- History of cricket in Bangladesh
