= 2000–01 Bangladeshi cricket season =

The 2000–01 Bangladeshi cricket season marked the beginning of first-class domestic competition in Bangladesh, although the country had already staged first-class matches against touring teams in the previous year. The National Cricket League was constituted as the first-class championship.

== International tours ==
=== Indian cricket team in Bangladesh ===
India's national team visited Bangladesh in 2000–01 to take part in the inaugural Test match played by the Bangladesh national cricket team. The tour consisted of a one-off test match.

10–13 November 2000
Scorecard

| Bangladesh | v | India |
| 400 (153.3 Overs); Aminul Islam Bulbul 145 (380); Sunil Joshi 5/142 (45.3 Overs) | | 429 (141.3 Overs); Sunil Joshi 92 (180); Naimur Rahman 6/132 (44.3 Overs) |
| 91 (46.3 Overs); Habibul Bashar 30 (63); Javagal Srinath 3/19 (11 Overs) | | 64/1 (15 Overs); Rahul Dravid 41 (49); Hasibul Hossain 1/31 (6 Overs) |

India won by 9 wickets
Bangabandhu National Stadium, Dhaka
Umpires: Steve Bucknor (WI) and David Shepherd (ENG)
Player of the match: Sunil Joshi

- Bangladesh won the toss and elected to bat
- Akram Khan, Al Sahariar, Aminul Islam Bulbul, Habibul Bashar, Khaled Mashud, Mehrab Hossain, Mohammad Rafique, Naimur Rahman, Ranjan Das and Shahriar Hossain made their Test debuts for Bangladesh.
- Shiv Sunder Das, Saba Karim and Zaheer Khan made their debuts for India.

=== Bangladeshi cricket team in Zimbabwe ===
The Bangladesh national team also toured Zimbabwe and played 2 Test matches and 3 One Day Internationals in April 2001. Bangladesh lost all 5 matches.

== Domestic competitions ==
=== Honours ===
The National Cricket League champions were Biman Bangladesh Airlines. The most first-class runs were scored by Imran Farhat (Biman) with 735, and the most wickets taken were 57 by Enamul Haque (Chittagong).

=== National Cricket League ===
Although separate first-class and limited overs matches were contested by domestic teams in the 2000–01 season, results from both formats were combined to form a common points table. In the first round, teams were placed in two groups of four. Each team played a 3-day first-class match and a 50 overs limited overs match against the other teams in its group, home and away. The top two teams from each group progressed to the final round, where teams played a 4-day first-class and a 50 overs limited match against the qualifiers from the other group, home and away.

==== Group A ====
| Team | Pld | First-class matches | | | | | Limited overs | | Pts |
| Team | Pld | W | L | DWF | DLF | ND | W | L | Pts |
|---|---|---|---|---|---|---|---|---|---|
| Biman Bangladesh Airlines | 12 | 2 | 0 | 3 | 1 | 0 | 4 | 2 | 32 |
| Chittagong Division | 12 | 3 | 0 | 2 | 1 | 0 | 2 | 4 | 30 |
| Rajshahi Division | 12 | 2 | 2 | 0 | 2 | 0 | 3 | 3 | 18 |
| Dhaka Division | 12 | 0 | 5 | 0 | 1 | 0 | 3 | 3 | 6 |

==== Group B ====
| Team | Pld | First-class matches | | | | | Limited overs | | Pts |
| Team | Pld | W | L | DWF | DLF | ND | W | L | Pts |
|---|---|---|---|---|---|---|---|---|---|
| Dhaka Metropolis | 12 | 2 | 0 | 2 | 2 | 0 | 3 | 3 | 26 |
| Khulna Division | 12 | 3 | 1 | 1 | 1 | 0 | 2 | 4 | 26 |
| Barisal Division | 12 | 0 | 2 | 2 | 1 | 1 | 3 | 3 | 15 |
| Sylhet Division | 12 | 0 | 2 | 1 | 2 | 1 | 4 | 2 | 13 |

==== Final stage ====
| Team | Pld | First-class matches | | | | | Limited overs | | Pts |
| Team | Pld | W | L | DWF | DLF | ND | W | L | Pts |
|---|---|---|---|---|---|---|---|---|---|
| Biman Bangladesh Airlines | 20 | 4 | 1 | 4 | 1 | 0 | 6 | 4 | 52 |
| Chittagong Division | 20 | 5 | 1 | 2 | 2 | 0 | 3 | 7 | 44 |
| Dhaka Metropolis | 20 | 3 | 1 | 3 | 3 | 0 | 6 | 4 | 42 |
| Khulna Division | 20 | 4 | 4 | 1 | 1 | 0 | 4 | 6 | 36 |

== Other matches ==
| Date | Type | Match | Result | Report |
|---|---|---|---|---|
| 7–9 January 2000 | 3-Day Match | BCB Under-21 v Australian Cricket Academy | Draw | Scorecard |
| 12–14 January 2000 | 3-Day Match | BCB Presidents XI v Australian Cricket Academy | Draw | Scorecard |
| 15 January 2000 | 50 Over Match | BCB Presidents XI v Australian Cricket Academy | Australian Cricket Academy won by 4 wickets | Scorecard |
| 17–20 January 2000 | 4-Day Match | BCB XI v Australian Cricket Academy | Australian Cricket Academy won by 155 runs | Scorecard |
| 23 January 2000 | 50 Over Match | BCB XI v Australian Cricket Academy | Australian Cricket Academy won by 154 runs | Scorecard |
| 24 January 2000 | 50 Over Match | BCB XI v Australian Cricket Academy | Australian Cricket Academy won by 5 wickets | Scorecard |
| 25 January 2000 | 50 Over Match | BCB XI v Australian Cricket Academy | Australian Cricket Academy won by 6 wickets | Scorecard |
| 27 March 2000 | 50 Over Match | BCB XI v Asia XI | Asia XI won by 5 wickets | Scorecard |

== See also ==
- History of cricket in Bangladesh
