= 2007–08 Bangladeshi cricket season =

The 2007–08 Bangladeshi cricket season featured a Test series between Bangladesh and South Africa.

== Honours ==
- National Cricket League – Khulna Division
- One-Day League – Rajshahi Division
- Most runs – Nazimuddin 720 @ 37.89 (HS 121*)
- Most wickets – Mosharraf Hossain 44 @ 24.52 (BB 6/13)

== Test series ==
South Africa played two Test matches and three One Day Internationals, winning both Tests and all three ODIs.

== See also ==
- History of cricket in Bangladesh

== External sources ==
- Miscellaneous articles re Bangladesh cricket
- CricInfo re Bangladesh
- CricketArchive re tournaments in Bangladesh in 2007–08
