= 2015–16 Bangladeshi cricket season =

The 2016 Asia Cup was held in Bangladesh in the 2015–16 Bangladeshi cricket season. The season was to feature a tour of the country by Australia but it was postponed amid security concerns. Khulna Division won the National Cricket League (NCL) championship title for the fourth time and Comilla Victorians won the revived Bangladesh Premier League (BPL).

== Honours ==
- National Cricket League – Khulna Division
- Bangladesh Premier League – Comilla Victorians
- Most runs – Shahriar Nafees (Barisal) 1,117 @ 62.05
- Most wickets – Abdur Razzak (Khulna) 66 @ 33.71

== International cricket ==
Australia was due to tour Bangladesh from 28 September to 21 October 2015 and play two Test matches but the tour was postponed amid security concerns.

India beat Bangladesh by 8 wickets in the final of the 2016 Asia Cup, held in Bangladesh.

== See also ==
- History of cricket in Bangladesh
