= 2009–10 Bangladeshi cricket season =

Domestic cricket season in Bamgladesh

The 2009–10 Bangladeshi cricket season featured Bangladesh playing a Test series against India, and later against England, and an ODI series against Zimbabwe. Rajshahi Division retained the National Cricket League championship title won the previous season.

== Honours ==
- National Cricket League – Rajshahi Division
- One-Day League – not contested
- Most runs – Jahurul Islam (Rajshahi) 1,008 @ 63.00
- Most wickets – Saqlain Sajib (Rajshahi) 54 @ 19.61

== International cricket ==
India played two Test matches in Bangladesh in January 2010, winning them both. England visited in February/March to play two Tests and three limited overs internationals, winning all five matches. Zimbabwe played five limited overs internationals, but no Tests, in October/November 2009, Bangladesh winning the series 4–1 after losing the opening match.

== See also ==
- History of cricket in Bangladesh

== External sources ==
- Miscellaneous articles re Bangladesh cricket
- CricInfo re Bangladesh
- CricketArchive re tournaments in Bangladesh in 2009–10
