= Mohammad Nuruzzaman =

Bangladeshi cricketer (born 1974)

Nuruzzaman
Personal information
- Full name: Mohammad Nuruzzaman
- Born: 8 June 1974 (age 52); Rajshahi, Bangladesh
- Nickname: Nayan
- Batting: Right-handed
- Bowling: Right arm medium pace

Domestic team information
- Years: Team
- 2000/01–2005/06: Rajshahi Division
- First-class debut: 22 November 2000 Rajshahi Division v Dhaka Division
- Last First-class: 4 December 2005 Rajshahi Division v Sylhet Division
- List A debut: 25 November 2000 Rajshahi Division v Dhaka Division
- Last List A: 15 February 2005 Rajshahi Division v Khulna Division

Career statistics
Competition	FC	LA
Matches	35	31
Runs scored	1948	603
Batting average	36.07	20.79
100s/50s	4/7	–/2
Top score	161	67
Balls bowled	1121	1296
Wickets	15	18
Bowling average	39.80	38.22
5 wickets in innings	1	–
10 wickets in match	–	–
Best bowling	6/135	4/17
Catches/stumpings	11/–	7/–
- Source: CricketArchive, 11 December 2016

Mohammad Nuruzzaman is a former first-class and List A cricketer from Bangladesh. He was born on 8 June 1974 in Rajshahi and is a right-handed batsman and right arm medium pacer. He appeared for Rajshahi Division between 2000/01 and 2005/06. He scored 4 first-class hundreds in his 35 games, with a best of 161 against Barisal Division and took 6 for 135 against Biman Bangladesh Airlines with the ball. He also scored two fifties in the one day arena.
