= 2010–11 Bangladeshi cricket season =

Bangladesh co-hosted with India and Sri Lanka the 2011 Cricket World Cup from February to April 2011 during the 2010–11 Bangladeshi cricket season. Bangladesh also hosted New Zealand in October 2010 for a limited overs international series. Rajshahi Division won their third consecutive National Cricket League championship title. The One Day League was contested a final time and won by Dhaka Division.

== Honours ==
- National Cricket League – Rajshahi Division
- One-Day League – Dhaka Division
- Most runs – Nasiruddin Faruque (Barisal) 632 @ 52.66
- Most wickets – Sohag Gazi (Barisal) 41 @ 23.26

== International cricket ==
New Zealand played five limited overs internationals, but no Tests, in October 2010, Bangladesh winning the series 4–0 after the second match was abandoned. This was the first time Bangladesh won an international series against a full-strength Test-playing nation (barring the West Indies series plagued by strikes).

Bangladesh co-hosted with India and Sri Lanka the 2011 Cricket World Cup from February to April 2011. Bangladesh failed to qualify for the quarter-finals stage.

== See also ==
- History of cricket in Bangladesh

== External sources ==
- Miscellaneous articles re Bangladesh cricket
- CricInfo re Bangladesh
- CricketArchive re tournaments in Bangladesh in 2010–11
