= 2006–07 Bangladeshi cricket season =

The 2006–07 Bangladeshi cricket season featured a Test series between Bangladesh and India.

== Honours ==
- National Cricket League – Dhaka Division
- One-Day League – Dhaka Division
- Most runs – Gazi Salahuddin 807 @ 42.47 (HS 165)
- Most wickets – Shabbir Khan 53 @ 28.30 (BB 7–134)

== Test series ==
India played 2 Test matches and 3 limited overs internationals, winning one Test and two internationals. The remaining Test was drawn and the third international was abandoned due to torrential rain. For information about this tour, see: Indian cricket team in Bangladesh in 2007.

== See also ==
- History of cricket in Bangladesh

== External sources ==
- Miscellaneous articles re Bangladesh cricket
- CricInfo re Bangladesh
- CricketArchive re tournaments in Bangladesh
