= 2008–09 Bangladeshi cricket season =

The 2008–09 Bangladeshi cricket season featured Bangladesh playing Test series against New Zealand and Sri Lanka at home.

== Honours ==
- National Cricket League – Rajshahi Division
- One-Day League – Barisal Division
- Most runs – Faisal Hossain 775 @ 51.66 (HS 129)
- Most wickets – Suhrawadi Shuvo 59 @ 17.71 (BB 6/71)

== Test series ==
New Zealand played two Test matches and three One Day Internationals in Bangladesh in October 2008, winning one Test and two ODIs. The other Test was drawn, and Bangladesh won the remaining ODI. Sri Lanka also played two Tests in Bangladesh in December 2008 and January 2009, winning both. They were also involved in a triangular ODI tournament with Bangladesh and Zimbabwe. Sri Lanka beat Bangladesh in the final.

== See also ==
- History of cricket in Bangladesh

== External sources ==
- Miscellaneous articles re Bangladesh cricket
- CricInfo re Bangladesh
- CricketArchive re tournaments in Bangladesh in 2008–09
