= 2014–15 Bangladeshi cricket season =

The 2014–15 Bangladeshi cricket season featured tours of the country by Zimbabwe and Pakistan. Rangpur Division won the National Cricket League (NCL) championship title for the first time.

== Honours ==
- National Cricket League – Rangpur Division
- Bangladesh Cricket League – South Zone
- Dhaka Premier Division Cricket League – Prime Bank Cricket Club
- Bangladesh Premier League – not contested
- Most runs – Liton Das (Rangpur) 1,232 @ 77.00
- Most wickets – Abdur Razzak (Khulna) 59 @ 25.81

== International cricket ==
Zimbabwe toured Bangladesh from 26 October to 1 December 2014, playing three Test matches and five One Day International matches. Bangladesh won the Test series 3–0 and the ODI series 5–0.

Pakistan toured from 15 April to 10 May 2015, playing one Twenty20 International (T20I), three One Day Internationals (ODIs) and two Test matches. Pakistan won the Test series 1–0 after the first Test was drawn, but Bangladesh won the ODI series 3–0, Bangladesh first ever series win against Pakistan, and also won the sole Twenty20 International.

== See also ==
- History of cricket in Bangladesh
