= National Cricket League =

Bangladeshi Cricket Tournament

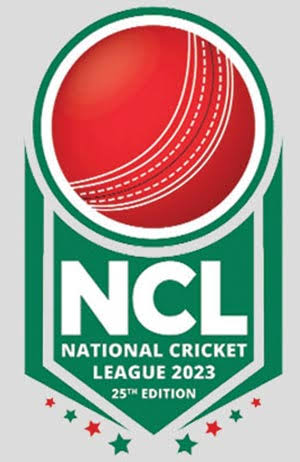
- Countries: Bangladesh
- Administrator: Bangladesh Cricket Board
- Format: First-class
- First edition: 1999–2000
- Latest edition: 2026–27
- Next edition: 2027–28
- Tournament format: Round-robin
- Number of teams: 8
- Current champion: Khulna Division (8th title)
- Most successful: Khulna Division (8 titles)
- Most runs: Tushar Imran (6086)
- Most wickets: Abdur Razzak (306)
- Website: 27th National Cricket League 2025–26
- 2026–27

The National Cricket League (Bengali: জাতীয় ক্রিকেট লিগ) is the oldest domestic first-class cricket competition in Bangladesh. It is contested by teams representing the eight regional divisions of Bangladesh.

== History and format ==
The National Cricket League was inaugurated in the 1999–2000 season but did not then have first-class status. Bangladesh became the tenth Full Member of the International Cricket Council in 2000 and consequently the league became first-class in the 2000–01 season. Limited-overs and Twenty20 tournaments with the same name have also been played in the past. A Second XI tournament running alongside the NCL is introduced in the 2026-27 season.

Since 2011–12 there have been eight teams in the league, which usually runs from October to December. From 2011–12 to 2014–15 each team played every other team once over the course of the season. From 2015–16 to 2023–24 there was a two-tier league: Rangpur, Khulna, Dhaka Division and Dhaka Metropolis were in the first tier in 2015–16, and Rajshahi, Sylhet, Barisal and Chittagong in the second. After each season the bottom team of tier 1 and the top team of tier 2 swapped places for the next season's competition. For the 2024–25 season the league reverted to an eight-team round-robin. For the 2025–26 season, a new team representing Mymensingh Division replaced the Dhaka Metropolis team.

The league is also sometimes known under its main sponsor's name. In 2015–16 it was officially the "Walton LED TV 17th National Cricket League". In October 2019 the Walton Group became the title sponsor of NCL for the next three years, and the league would be known officially as the "Walton NCL". In 2024–25 it was the "Modhumoti Bank 26th National Cricket League".

== Teams ==
| Logo | Team | Captain | Home Ground | Participation | Titles |
|---|---|---|---|---|---|
| | Barishal Division | Iftakhar Hossain Ifti | Kobi Jibanananda Das Stadium | since 1999–2000 | 0 |
| | Chittagong Division | Irfan Shukkur | Bir Shrestho Flight Lieutenant Matiur Rahman Cricket Stadium | since 1999–2000 | 1 |
| | Dhaka Division | Mahidul Islam Ankon | Sher-e-Bangla National Cricket Stadium | since 1999–2000 | 7 |
| | Mymensingh Division | Rakibul Hasan | TBD | since 2025–26 | 0 |
| | Khulna Division | Mohammad Mithun | Khulna Divisional Stadium | since 1999–2000 | 8 |
| | Rajshahi Division | Sabbir Hossain | Rajshahi Divisional Stadium | since 1999–2000 | 6 |
| | Rangpur Division | Akbar Ali | Rangpur Cricket Garden | since 2011–12 | 3 |
| | Sylhet Division | Zakir Hasan | Sylhet International Cricket Stadium | since 1999–2000 | 1 |

=== Defunct teams ===
| Team | Home ground | Debut | Dissolved |
|---|---|---|---|
| Biman Bangladesh Airlines | Bangladesh Krira Shikkha Protisthan No 1 Ground | 2000–01 | 2000–01 |
| Dhaka Metropolis | Sher-e-Bangla National Cricket Stadium | 2000–01 | 2025–26 |

== Winners ==
Winners of the National Cricket League in each season are:

| Season | Winner |
|---|---|
| 1999–2000 | Chittagong Division (NB: 1999–2000 was not a first-class competition) |
| 2000–01 | Biman Bangladesh Airlines |
| 2001–02 | Dhaka Division |
| 2002–03 | Khulna Division |
| 2003–04 | Dhaka Division |
| 2004–05 | Dhaka Division |
| 2005–06 | Rajshahi Division |
| 2006–07 | Dhaka Division |
| 2007–08 | Khulna Division |
| 2008–09 | Rajshahi Division |
| 2009–10 | Rajshahi Division |
| 2010–11 | Rajshahi Division |
| 2011–12 | Rajshahi Division |
| 2012–13 | Khulna Division |
| 2013–14 | Dhaka Division |
| 2014–15 | Rangpur Division |
| 2015–16 | Khulna Division |
| 2016–17 | Khulna Division |
| 2017–18 | Khulna Division |
| 2018–19 | Rajshahi Division |
| 2019–20 | Khulna Division |
| 2020–21 | Cancelled due to COVID-19 pandemic |
| 2021–22 | Dhaka Division |
| 2022–23 | Rangpur Division |
| 2023–24 | Dhaka Division |
| 2024–25 | Sylhet Division |
| 2025–26 | Rangpur Division |
| 2026–27 | Khulna Division |

== Records ==
=== Highest team scores ===
| Total | For and against | Venue | Season |
|---|---|---|---|
| 756/5d | Dhaka Division v. Rajshahi Division | BKSP | 2013–14 |
| 675/9d | Rajshahi Division v. Chittagong Division | Chittagong | 2013–14 |
| 668 | Rajshahi Division v. Dhaka Metropolis | BKSP | 2017–18 |
| 668 | Barisal Division v. Rangpur Division | BKSP | 2014–15 |

=== Lowest team scores ===
| Total | For and against | Venue | Season |
|---|---|---|---|
| 42 | Rajshahi Division v. Dhaka Division | Bogra | 2024–25 |
| 46 | Barisal Division v. Khulna Division | Khulna | 2023–24 |
| 48 | Dhaka Metro v. Rangpur Division | Bogra | 2013–14 |

=== Most runs in an innings ===
| Total | Batsman | For and against | Venue | Season |
|---|---|---|---|---|
| 295 | Nasir Hossain | Rangpur Division v. Barisal Division | Rajshahi | 2017–18 |
| 282 | Mosaddek Hossain | Barisal Division v. Chittagong Division | BKSP | 2014–15 |
| 282 | Mohammad Naim | Dhaka Division v. Rajshahi Division | Rajshahi | 2026–27 |

=== Best bowling in an innings ===
| Total | Bowler | For and against | Venue | Season |
|---|---|---|---|---|
| 9/84 | Abdur Razzak | Khulna Division v. Chittagong Division | Bogra | 2012–13 |
| 9/91 | Abdur Razzak | Khulna Division v. Dhaka Metropolis | Cox's Bazar | 2013–14 |
| 9/168 | Rakibul Hasan | Mymensingh Division v. Sylhet Division | Sylhet | 2025–26 |

== National Cricket League One-Day winners ==
- 2000–01 – Biman Bangladeshi Airlines (1/1)
- 2001–02 – Sylhet Division (1/1)
- 2002–03 – Khulna Division (1/1)
- 2003–04 – Chittagong Division (1/1)
- 2004–05 – Rajshahi Division (1/3)
- 2005–06 – Rajshahi Division (2/2)
- 2006–07 – Dhaka Division (1/2)
- 2007–08 – Rajshahi Division (3/3)
- 2008–09 – Barisal Division (1/1)
- 2010–11 – Dhaka Division (2/2)

The National Cricket League one-day competition is no longer held. It has been superseded by the Dhaka Premier Division Cricket League as Bangladesh's List A competition.

== National Cricket League Twenty20 winners ==
- 2010 – Rajshahi Division
- 2024 – Rangpur Division
- 2025 – Rangpur Division

== National Cricket League (2nd XI) winners ==
- 2026-27 - Dhaka Division

== See also ==
- Cricket in Bangladesh
- Bangladesh Cricket League
