= 2005–06 Bangladeshi cricket season =

The 2005–06 Bangladeshi cricket season featured Bangladesh playing their inaugural home Test series against Australia.

== Honours ==
- National Cricket League – Rajshahi Division
- One-Day League – Rajshahi Division
- Most runs – Ehsanul Haque 955 @ 59.68 (HS 138)
- Most wickets – Hasibul Hossain 57 @ 16.00 (BB 6–62)

== Test series ==
Australia played 2 Test matches and 3 limited overs internationals, winning all five games comfortably. For information about this tour, see: Australian cricket team in Bangladesh in 2005-06.

== See also ==
- History of cricket in Bangladesh

== External sources ==
- Miscellaneous articles re Bangladesh cricket
- CricInfo re Bangladesh
- CricketArchive re tournaments in Bangladesh
