= History of cricket in Bangladesh =

Historical review

The history of cricket in Bangladesh predates the foundation of the Bangladeshi state in 1971 by nearly two centuries. Cricket was introduced to Bengal by the British in the eighteenth century but its growth in East Bengal was slow. Following Partition and the creation of East Pakistan, both first-class and Test cricket were played there during the 1950s and 1960s. Although cricket continued to be popular after independence, especially in Dhaka, the country lost first-class status and had to establish itself in international competition as an Associate Member of the International Cricket Council (ICC).

After winning the 1997 ICC Trophy and making a good showing at the 1999 Cricket World Cup, Bangladesh created its National Cricket League (NCL) in 1999–2000 to prepare the way for full membership of the ICC. This was granted in 2000 and the Bangladesh Cricket Board (BCB) was formally established. In November 2000, the Bangladesh national team played its inaugural Test match against India at the Bangabandhu National Stadium in Dhaka.

== Bengal ==
Cricket was first introduced into Bengal by the British East India Company in the eighteenth century and the first cricket matches recorded were in Calcutta in 1792, but matches were possibly played more than a decade earlier and the sport quickly achieved popularity in western Bengal and neighbouring Bihar. In eastern Bengal, the area which is now Bangladesh, cricket developed very slowly as the area failed to attract large numbers of European settlers until the second half of the nineteenth century. The problems were the region's predominantly rural character and its lack of infrastructure given that it had numerous rivers and travel was extremely difficult. The confluence of the Ganges and the Brahmaputra is in central Bangladesh and the coastal area consists of the Sundarbans mangrove forest and the Ganges Delta. The British saw it as a remote region with few economic incentives. Improvement was gradual and it was not until the 1860s and 1870s that the British built the new roads that facilitated communication. Work was done to improve water supplies, with a consequent boost to public health, and Europeans began to settle in Dhaka with cricket soon becoming one of their favourite recreational activities, as had happened elsewhere in India. In 1876, a European XI met and defeated a Native XVIII in Dhaka.

A team representative of Bengal played against G. F. Vernon's XI, the first English team to visit the Indian sub-continent, in 1889–90. In January 1923, Bengal took part in the Nagpur Provincial Tournament with Bombay and a Central Provinces XI. In 1934, the Board of Control for Cricket in India organised the Ranji Trophy but Bengal did not take part in 1934–35. Bengal achieved first-class status in December 1935 when they played the Australian tourists and were defeated by 9 wickets. In January 1936, Bengal joined the Ranji Trophy, playing in the East Zone, and reached the semi-final where they lost to Madras. In 1937, Bengal were runners-up and, in 1939, winners of the Ranji Trophy. Throughout this period, Bengal was essentially a West Bengal team. They were based in Calcutta and played all their matches at Eden Gardens. The earliest match of note in Dhaka was in February 1941 when a Bengal Governor's XI played the Bengal Gymkhana at the Bangabandhu National Stadium, then called the Dacca Stadium.

With the Partition of British India in 1947, Bengal itself was partitioned with West Bengal remaining an Indian province and East Bengal becoming the eastern wing of Pakistan. In 1955, the western wing became West Pakistan and East Bengal became the new province of East Pakistan. The two wings were separated by some 1,600 km (1,000 miles) of Indian territory and, despite their common religion of Islam, the ethnic and linguistic gulf between the two, compounded by an apathetic government based in the west, eventually resulted in the independence of Bangladesh. While Pakistani cricket was strong in the west, there was no first-class cricket in East Bengal until the 1954–55 season.

== East Pakistan ==
Between the 1954–55 and 1970–71 seasons, thirteen East Pakistan first-class cricket teams played in Pakistan's domestic cricket competitions, the Quaid-i-Azam Trophy and the Ayub Trophy. Many played in only a single season or two. The most prolific were East Pakistan (nine seasons), Dhaka University, East Pakistan Greens and East Pakistan Whites (three each). Chittagong is a good example of the sporadic way in which teams from East Pakistan were involved in the national competitions as they were scheduled to play three matches between 1959–60 and 1965–66 and all were abandoned without play starting. The main East Pakistan team played first-class matches against the touring Indians in 1954–55 and Marylebone Cricket Club in 1955–56.

East Pakistan staged Test cricket from January 1955 when a match between Pakistan and India was allocated to the Bangabandhu National Stadium in Dhaka. The stadium was used for numerous important matches including Tests through the 1960s. The M. A. Aziz Stadium in Chittagong also dates back to 1954 as a first-class venue but it was not used for Tests until Bangladesh played there in 2001.

Relations between East and West Pakistan had been tense since Partition. East Pakistan was plunged into turmoil on 12 November 1970 when Cylone Bhola struck Bengal with enormous loss of life and devastating impact on the community and economy. The Pakistani government, based in West Pakistan, was roundly condemned for procrastination in its response to the crisis. A few weeks later, when the country's first general election was held on 7 December, widespread outrage in the East resulted in victory for the Awami League which was a Bengali nationalist party under the leadership of Sheikh Mujibur Rahman. This led to an opening of talks between representatives of the East and West wings of Pakistan about the future of the country's constitution under a national government headed by the Awami League, and proposals for the division of power between the central government and the provinces. The talks were unsuccessful in breaking a deadlock and, on 1 March 1971, Pakistani President Yahya Khan indefinitely postponed the pending National Assembly session, precipitating massive civil disobedience in East Pakistan. Three weeks later, Bangladesh formally declared its independence and the country was plunged into its liberation war which raged through 1971 until intervention by India, in support of the Bangladeshis, on 3 December 1971. The Indo-Pakistani War of 1971 was short-lived and resulted in Pakistan's capitulation on 16 December 1971, celebrated as Victory Day in Bangladesh, which was then established as a new nation.

The last first-class match to be completed in East Pakistan was between a Pakistan Cricket Board XI and the touring International XI in Dhaka from 26 February to 1 March 1971. It was drawn and its final day coincided with Yahya Khan's suspension of the National Assembly, the action which finally triggered the liberation war. The International XI left Dhaka next day for Lahore and played one further match there to end their tour. Two Quaid-i-Azam Trophy matches scheduled to be played in Dhaka during March were both cancelled because of the national emergency.

== 1972 to 1977 ==
After independence, the new state endured poverty, famine, political turmoil and military coups until the restoration of democracy in 1991 which has been followed by relative calm and economic progress. Cricket had to find its way forward amid the turmoil but it was helped by successive governments, civil and military, which treated its development with some importance. In 1972, the government created the Bangladesh Cricket Board, then called the Bangladesh Cricket Control Board, with a directive to organise cricket in the new country. In the aftermath of the war, this was no easy task. Barclays World of Cricket records that, in early 1975, the national stadium in Dhaka was "in such disrepair (some buildings being shell-torn) that the cricket square had sunk several inches after years of disuse".

The problems of post-war recovery apart, cricket was popular in Dhaka and the first organised competition of note was the club-level Dhaka Metropolis Knockout Tournament staged in February and March 1973. A national club championship began in 1974–75 and has been held in most seasons to 2015. This gained sponsorship by the Wills tobacco company from 1983 to 1984, then by Pepsi from 1993 to 1994, but it has never been a first-class competition. It has similar status to league cricket in England or grade cricket in Australia.

The worst of the problems had been addressed by the start of the 1976–77 season. In January 1977, the inaugural Bangladesh national cricket team was selected for a match against the touring MCC at the Bangabandhu National Stadium. MCC also played against North Zone, East Zone and South Zone which was the first time that any of these teams, now in the Bangladesh Cricket League, were selected. Although the MCC team included some notable county cricket players such as Mick Norman, John Barclay, Dan Piachaud and Nigel Popplewell, their matches on the 1976–77 tour were not first-class. Even so, Bangladesh made a favourable impression on MCC and it was in 1977 that the country became an Associate Member of the International Cricket Council (ICC).

== 1978 to 1986 ==
The first full international team to visit Bangladesh was Sri Lanka in January 1978. Sri Lanka was then close to ICC Full Member status (achieved in 1982) and their higher standard was underlined by a series of innings victories in the three international matches against Bangladesh. The three-day match in Dhaka starting on 13 January 1978, which Sri Lanka won by an innings and 9 runs, was Bangladesh's debut in international cricket but the very low standard of Bangladeshi cricket at the time means that it was not a first-class match.

Sri Lanka also played against a BCB President's XI, South Zone and Central Zone, the first time that this team was selected. In early February, the first Indian team to visit Bangladesh was the Hyderabad Blues who played a single game in Dhaka against the national team. MCC returned in December 1978 and played six matches at various locations, five of them against the national team. None of the 1978 matches were first-class.

Bangladesh made their competitive international debut when taking part in the 1979 ICC Trophy, held in England between 22 May and 21 June, but failed to reach the semi-final stage. Captained by Raqibul Hasan, Bangladesh were in Group B (there were three qualifying groups of five teams each) against Canada, Denmark, Fiji and Malaysia. Bangladesh struggled in their opening match against Fiji but were rescued by Ashraful Haque who took 7–23 to secure a 22-run victory. In the second match, Bangladesh were well beaten by Canada. They won convincingly against Malaysia and so needed to defeat Denmark in the last match to qualify for the semi-finals. It was a close game but Denmark won by ten runs. Denmark won the group with Canada second and both of these two qualified for the semi-finals, Bangladesh being placed third. Sri Lanka then defeated Denmark and Canada in turn to win the tournament.

In the 1979–80 season, Pakistan visited Bangladesh for the first time. It was eight years after the end of the Liberation War but tensions were still evident. The visit was in January during a break in Pakistan's six-Test tour of India. In a two-day match on 2 & 3 January, the Pakistanis played a BCB XI at the M. A. Aziz Stadium in Chittagong. The BCB XI played well though each of the first three innings were ended early by sporting declarations. At tea on the second day, with the BCB XI struggling to chase a target of 211, there was a crowd riot which prematurely terminated the game as a draw. Because of the riot, an international match due to start at the National Stadium two days later was cancelled. It was not until January 1994 that the Pakistan national team could safely tour Bangladesh. In March 1980, an inter-divisional tournament was staged which included teams from the Chittagong, Dhaka, Khulna and Rajshahi divisions. It was the first time that divisional teams were selected and this tournament anticipated the National Cricket League which was launched twenty years later. Fortunately, the riot in 1980 did not deter other tourists and MCC returned to Bangladesh in 1980–81, followed by the Calcutta and Hyderabad clubs from India in 1981–82.

In the 1982 ICC Trophy, also held in England, Bangladesh reached the semi-finals and lost to the eventual winners, Zimbabwe. This time, there were sixteen teams divided into two groups of eight. Bangladesh were in Group B. Two of their seven matches were abandoned because of bad weather and they had two very narrow wins against Malaysia, by a single run, and Netherlands, by four runs. They had only one defeat and so finished second. The defeat was against group winners Bermuda and it was a heavy one, again exposing Bangladesh's limitations at this stage of their development. Bangladesh were bowled out for only 67 and Bermuda needed just 15.5 overs to win by seven wickets. The limitations were again exposed in the semi-final when Bangladesh's batsmen could only reach 124, Zimbabwe winning easily by eight wickets. Zimbabwe defeated Bermuda in the final and there was another setback for Bangladesh when they lost the third-place playoff match to Papua New Guinea by three wickets despite an innings of 115 by Yousuf Rahman.

In 1983–84, Bangladesh hosted a tournament for the first time. This was the South East Asian Tournament (limited overs) in which the national team played against Hong Kong, Singapore and a BCB under-25 XI. Bangladesh defeated Hong Kong by 3 wickets in the final to claim the country's first international trophy.

The first New Zealand team to visit Bangladesh arrived in 1984–85. This was the New Zealand Ambassadors who played two limited overs matches in January against Dhaka University and a BCB Under-25 XI. In March, Sri Lanka returned to play a single three-day match against Bangladesh, captained by Gazi Ashraf, in the National Stadium. Bangladesh did well to secure a draw after scoring 139 and 152 for 6 against Sri Lanka's 429 for 9 declared.

In the 1985–86 season, neighbouring Bengal toured Bangladesh and played four matches against university and BCB teams in February and March. On the basis of their triumph in the South East Asian Tournament two years earlier, Bangladesh were invited to take part in the 1986 Asia Cup, the first edition of this tournament, in Sri Lanka after India withdrew. On 31 March, Bangladesh played their first-ever List A-classified Limited Overs International against Pakistan at the Tyronne Fernando Stadium in Moratuwa. Captained by Gazi Ashraf, Bangladesh were dismissed for 94 and Pakistan won easily by seven wickets. Three days later, Bangladesh lost to Sri Lanka by the same margin.

Writing in 1986, Robin Marlar expressed positive views about Bangladeshi cricket including his opinion that the country would, with more encouragement and experience, one day win the ICC Trophy. He also mentioned the large crowds attending matches and the potential for thousands more to play the game. In June and July, Bangladesh competed in the 1986 ICC Trophy, again held in England. As in 1982, there were two qualifying groups and Bangladesh were placed sixth in Group A after a disappointing campaign.

== 1987 to 1996 ==
Bangladesh hosted the 1988 Asia Cup, competing against India, Pakistan and Sri Lanka in the first List A classified matches to be played in the country. Bangladesh were the rank outsiders and, as expected, were easily beaten by each of their three opponents. Gazi Ashraf again captained the team. Five of the tournament's seven matches, including the final, were played at the Bangabandhu National Stadium and the other two, both involving Bangladesh themselves, at the M. A. Aziz Stadium in Chittagong. The tournament was won by India who defeated Sri Lanka by six wickets in the final.

There were visits by the Hyderabad Blues and Denmark in January and February 1990 to play limited overs games against the BCB XI and club sides only and none of the matches were List A classified. The 1990 ICC Trophy in June was held in the Netherlands and Bangladesh performed with credit, qualifying via two group phases for the semi-final where they were drawn against Zimbabwe and lost by 84 runs. Zimbabwe, who won the tournament, were elected to ICC Full Member status soon afterwards. Bangladesh played in the 1990–91 Asia Cup in India but were well beaten in their two matches by Sri Lanka and the host nation.

In December 1992, Bangladesh hosted a SAARC Quadrangular tournament in which their national team competed against the A-teams of India, Pakistan and Sri Lanka, all the matches being List A classified and all to be played in Dhaka at the National Stadium. Bangladesh defeated Sri Lanka A by seven wickets in the opening game but then lost by five wickets to Pakistan A. Their third match against India A was interrupted in the ninth over by a crowd riot and abandoned. It was rescheduled three days later but with the situation still volatile, it was cancelled along with the final which would have been India A v Pakistan A.

The situation was calmer the following season (1993–94) when there were short visits by Zimbabwe (November) and Pakistan (January) to play two limited overs matches each against the national team. Being friendlies, these games are not List A-classified. Zimbabwe won their matches by margins of 9 and 13 runs. Pakistan won their two games by 62 runs and 7 wickets. Although the national team were having limited success against opponents with greater experience, domestic cricket in Bangladesh was making progress and expanding. In 1994, the ICC estimated that there were 93,000 people playing cricket in Bangladesh and, as a result, playing standards were rising.

In the same 1993-94 season the BCB inked a sponsorship agreement with Pepsi for the national cricket championship with the aim of eventually structuring the championship to be similar to India's Ranji Trophy in furtherance of Bangladesh's Test ambitions. A joint Pepsi-BCB Foundation for coaching budding players was also part of the agreement. To this end the 1993/94 Pepsi National Cricket Championship retained the traditional 45-overs one day format for the zonal group games but the semi-finals consisted of each team having a single 60-over innings and the match being played over two days and the final consisted of a two day match with each team having a single 80-overs innings.

Bangladesh competed in the 1994 ICC Trophy in Kenya and reached the quarter-final stage and finished third in their group behind Kenya and the Netherlands. In December 1994, Bangladesh hosted a second SAARC Quadrangular against the A-teams of India, Pakistan and Sri Lanka, all the matches being List A classified and all to be played in Dhaka at the National Stadium. The problems of 1992 were not repeated and Bangladesh reached the final where they lost to India A by 52 runs. Kenya, one of Bangladesh's main opponents in Associate Member cricket, visited in January 1995 to play five one-day matches. These were not List A classified and Bangladesh won all three of the international fixtures. England's A team visited Bangladesh in February 1995 and played three double innings matches, not first-class, all against the national team. England A won the first two and the third, in which Aminul Islam scored a century, was drawn. Bangladesh were in the 1995 Asia Cup in Sharjah against India, Pakistan and Sri Lanka but lost all three of their first round matches. MCC returned in February 1996 to play a mixture of one-day and three-day matches.

For the 1994-95 Pepsi National Cricket Championship, the format returned entirely to a 45-overs one day tournament even for the semi-finals and final.

== 1997 to 2000 ==
Bangladesh first began to actively pursue full membership and test status recognition within the ICC from 1996 with the induction of the new Board President, Saber Hossain Chowdhury.

The SAARC Quadrangular returned to Bangladesh in February 1997, Pakistan A defeating India A in the final. Bangladesh fared badly and were well beaten in all of their three matches. Disappointing as that was, only two months later Bangladesh had their first international success when they won the 1997 ICC Trophy in Kuala Lumpur.

Bangladesh won all five of their matches in the tournament's Group B to reach the quarter-finals, which were two more round-robin groups of four. Bangladesh qualified for the semi-finals defeating Netherlands and Hong Kong while the other game against Ireland was abandoned because of bad weather. In the semi-final, Bangladesh defeated Scotland by 72 runs. They were now playing in the final itself against Kenya and winning by two wickets, scoring the winning run from the last ball of the match.

Following the success of the team in the ICC Trophy, BCB president Chowdhury informed the CEO of the ICC Dave Richards that Bangladesh intended to apply for test status. Aware that on-field performances alone would not be enough to secure full membership for Bangladesh despite an ICC development committee having already recommended Bangladesh as the 10th full member and test playing nation ahead of the ICC's annual meeting in June 1997, Chowdhury and the board also targeted host major international cricket series, including the Independence Trophy, the first ICC Knockout tournament in 1998, and the final of the Asian Test Championship.

Domestically, Bangladesh began to reintroduce multi-day two innings matches, with an eye towards applying for full membership and test cricket status, with the 1997 National Cricket Championship where a four-day final (with 2 innings per team) was scheduled, but Chittagong DSA beat Bangladesh Biman by and innings and 64 runs with a day to spare to retain the Championship on May 12.

Bangladesh applied for full membership and test status in May 1997, with India proposing and Pakistan seconding the application. However, the dearth of the longer form of the game in Bangladesh and disappointing on-field results persuaded the ICC against granting full membership.

At the June 1997 ICC annual meeting the ICC moved to expand cricket worldwide by conferring on Bangladesh both first-class and one-day status. This meant that any matches they play against full member countries were considered official one-day internationals, or would have first-class status if they were three or four-day matches. New Zealand was slated to be one of the first countries to host Bangladesh under this status in the 1997-98 season.

The national team's debut in official first-class cricket was 17–19 November 1997 at Seddon Park, Hamilton, New Zealand, against a Northern Conference team. Bangladesh were guesting in the 1997–98 Shell Conference. They lost this match by an innings and 151 runs and were similarly outclassed in their other matches in the tournament. In January 1998, Bangladesh hosted the List A-classified Coca-Cola Silver Jubilee Independence Cup involving India and Pakistan. They lost both their matches and India defeated Pakistan in the final.

At their annual meeting in June 1998, the ICC executive committee extended the time-limit for Bangladesh to justify its claim for full membership and test status by one year to the next ICC annual general meeting in June 1999. To this end, the ICC formed a three member committee (with Bobby Simpson of Australia, Nasim-ul Ghani of Pakistan and Andy Pycroft of Zimbabwe) to assess the conditions of wickets and umpiring and work out details for Bangladesh's domestic cricket including the introduction of regularly structured matches of the longer form of cricket.

In 1998–99, Bangladesh hosted the 1998 ICC KnockOut Trophy (known as the Wills International Cup) during October and November, although it being for Test nations only they could not play themselves but providing neutral venue. South Africa won the tournament. During November, the West Indies A team visited and having played three List A matches against Bangladesh, starting on 12 November the two teams played the first-ever first-class match in Bangladesh (i.e., since independence). West Indies A won by 8 wickets. The final of the 1998–99 Asian Test Championship was played at Dhaka in March 1999, Pakistan winning by an innings and 175 runs against Sri Lanka. Later that month, Bangladesh hosted Kenya and Zimbabwe for the List A Meril International Tournament, won convincingly by Zimbabwe.

In domestic cricket, Bangladesh continued putting in place the structures to support their bid for full member status as the National Cricket Championship continued having multi-day two innings matches for the semi-finals and finals (group matches were now 50-over one day games while semi-finals were three-day matches and finals were four-day matches) for both the 1998 season and the 1998-99 season. Additionally the BCB decided to change the format of the Dhaka Premier Division Cricket League in the 1998-99 season from the traditional 50-over one day format to matches of 80-overs per side played over two days to enable more players to be habituated in playing two or three days matches.

There was some controversy over this decision to change the format of the Dhaka Premier Division Cricket League, since there were concerns that players would not be adequately prepared ahead of the 1999 Cricket World Cup which followed the 50-over one day format.

The Bangladesh team played in the Cricket World Cup for the first time, having qualified by winning the 1997 ICC Trophy, for the 1999 tournament in Great Britain. They did not get past the group stage but had a memorable victory by 62 runs over Pakistan.

On 25 June, five days after the conclusion of 1999 Cricket World Cup, Bangladesh lost a vote on becoming a full member when it secured the votes of 5 full members (India, Pakistan, Sri Lanka, West Indies and Zimbabwe) and the then all 25 associate members (it required the votes of 7 full members and all 25 associates in order to have become a full member). Board President Chowdhury considered the vote an encouraging development as prior to the vote it was thought that only the three Asian full members would have voted in favour. As Chowdhury later noted, all nine of the full members supported Bangladesh's ambition for full membership, however in that vote, five voted in favour of full membership at that time while the other four advised for a review of Bangladesh's performance for another year.

Following the 1999 vote, the BCB conducted more cricket diplomacy targeting especially Australia and South Africa with development deals between them and the BCB in order to obtain the required vote of 7 full members. Meanwhile as part of an ICC plan to prepare Bangladesh for test status and to address some shortcomings that surfaced in an ICC report at that 1999 meeting, it was planned for two Test teams and as two 'A' teams to visit Bangladesh that coming winter with a focus on three to four-day matches.

Further domestic developments to support the bid for full membership occurred with the inauguration of the National Cricket League as a league tournament of three-day matches among teams representing Bangladesh's divisions The BCB executive committee had voted to introduce a national league of three-day matches similar to India's Ranji trophy and Pakistan's Qaid-E-Azam trophy at their 6 August 1999 meeting. Originally intending to run from 10 November until 20 December, the tournament actually ran from 16 November 1999 until 5 January 2000 with Chittagong winning the tournament after topping the points table.

Bangladesh's efforts both on the field (internationally and domestically) and off the field (with engagement with the full member boards) began to pay off in early 2000 as by February 2000 the executive board of the ICC had recommended full membership for Bangladesh at the June 2000 annual meeting of the full ICC board and between March and May 2000 the boards for Australia, Pakistan and New Zealand all voiced their support for Bangladesh's bid for test status.

Finally, Bangladesh's progress had received recognition and, on 26 June 2000 by the unanimous vote of all 9 full members, Bangladesh became a Full Member of the ICC, which enabled them to play Test cricket. The BCB president Saber Chowdhury described his country's elevation to Test status as "the third most historic event in our national life". In May/June 2000, Bangladesh had hosted the 2000 Asia Cup, won by Pakistan. In November of that year, Bangladesh played their first-ever Test match against India at the National Stadium, India winning by 9 wickets.

== 2001 to 2010 ==
The country's main domestic competition, the National Cricket League (NCL), began in 1999–2000 with teams from each of Bangladesh's (then six) administrative divisions: Barisal, Chittagong, Dhaka, Khulna, Rajshahi and Sylhet.

In 2000–01, its second season, the NCL became a first-class competition, sponsored by the Green Delta insurance company, and won by Biman Bangladesh Airlines. The 2000–01 NCL involved eight teams playing twelve matches each in two groups. Four teams qualified for a final stage in which they each played a further eight games. Group A consisted of Biman Bangladesh Airlines, Chittagong, Rajshahi and Dhaka Division. Group B had Dhaka Metropolis, Khulna, Barisal and Sylhet.

In 2001–02, Ispahani Mirzapore Tea became the sponsor of the NCL in addition to the new One-Day League, introduced as the premier limited overs competition. The NCL was reduced to six teams in 2001–02 with Dhaka Metropolis and the champions, Biman Bangladesh Airlines, both dropping out. Following creation of Rangpur Division in January 2010 as the country's seventh administrative region, the NCL in 2011–12 was again expanded to eight teams with the introduction of the Rangpur team and the return of Dhaka Metropolis, although the latter had no settled home venue.

Between 2001 and 2004, Bangladesh suffered from heavy defeats in ODI's. They also suffered from 5 heavy defeats and 1 no results in 2003 Cricket World Cup.

The board officially changed its name to Bangladesh Cricket Board (BCB), dropping the word "Control" from its title in January 2007.

== 2011 to 2019 ==
The One-Day League was terminated after the 2010–11 season. The main List A limited overs competition since then has been the Dhaka Premier Division Cricket League, which began in 1974–75 and gained List A status in 2013–14.

Bangladesh co-hosted the 2011 Cricket World Cup with India and Sri Lanka. The country was the sole host of the 2014 ICC World Twenty20, the final of which was played at the Sher-e-Bangla National Cricket Stadium. In addition, Bangladesh has hosted, in succession, the three Asia Cup tournaments in 2012, 2014 and 2016.

Bangladesh also continued to do well in test cricket. They have beaten England and Sri Lanka in 2016–17 session. The win against Sri Lanka was the 100th test match and 9th winning test match for Bangladesh. A few months later they have beaten Australian test team in 1 match and drawn the series.

The Bangladesh Cricket League (BCL), another first-class competition, began in 2012–13. It is played by four teams selected on a zonal basis (North Zone, South Zone, East Zone and Central Zone) to give experience to leading players of a higher standard than the NCL and so prepare them for Test cricket. The winners of the four championships to 2016 have been Central Zone and South Zone winning two apiece. In April 2015, the BCL staged a One-Day League, which was won by East Zone.

The Bangladesh Premier League (BPL) is the country's main Twenty20 competition. It was founded in January 2012 and despite problems including match-fixing, it has been a commercial success, said by its promoters to be second only to the Indian Premier League (IPL) in terms of global revenue.

== 2020 to present ==
=== Bangabandhu centenary ===
In 2020, to celebrate the birth centenary of Sheikh Mujibur Rahman, the BCB held a 50-over tournament named the BCB President's Cup with three teams, and a T20 tournament named the Bangabandhu T20 Cup with five.

== See also ==
- Cricket in Bangladesh
- Bangladesh national cricket team
- Bangladesh national women's cricket team
- Bangladesh Cricket Board, the controlling body for cricket in Bangladesh

== Bibliography ==
- Bowen, Rowland (1970). Cricket: A History of its Growth and Development. London: Eyre & Spottiswoode. ISBN 0-413-27860-3.
- Harte, Chris (1993). A History of Australian Cricket. London: Andre Deutsch. p. 175. ISBN 0-233-98825-4.
- Morgan, Roy (2007). Encyclopaedia of World Cricket. Cheltenham: SportsBooks Ltd. ISBN 978-1-899807-51-2.
