= Chittagong Division cricket team =

Bangladeshi cricket team

Chittagong Division Cricket Team

Personnel
- Captain: Yasir Ali

Team information
- Home ground: Bir Shrestho Flight Lieutenant Matiur Rahman Cricket Stadium, Chittagong
- Capacity: 22,000

History
- First-class debut: in 1999-2000
- National Cricket League wins: 1
- National Cricket League One-Day wins: 1

Chittagong Division cricket team represents the Chittagong Division, one of the eight administrative regions in Bangladesh. The team was founded in 1999 to compete in the National Cricket League (NCL) and plays first-class cricket and Twenty20 cricket. While the team originally adopted the name Cyclones of Chittagong for the inaugural NCL T20 season in 2010, it returned to the format under the divisional name for the 2024–25 NCL T20 revival. The equivalent team in the Bangladesh Premier League is the Chattogram Royals.

Chittagong Division play most of their home games at the Bir Shrestho Flight Lieutenant Matiur Rahman Cricket Stadium (BSFLMRCS) in the port city of Chittagong. The BSFLMRCS has superseded the older District Stadium, Chittagong (DSC) as Chittagong's main cricket venue. The District Stadium is now used primarily for football.

== Honours ==
- National Cricket League (1) – 1999–2000
- One-Day Cricket League (1) – 2003–04

== History ==
Before Bangladesh became independent, Chittagong was part of East Pakistan and it had a cricket team which was scheduled to take part in the Quaid-i-Azam Trophy in both 1959–60 and 1964–65, and in the Ayub Trophy in 1962–63. None of the scheduled matches took place as all were abandoned without any start of play. East Pakistan cricket had a chequered history and it was only after independence that cricket in Bangladesh gained any real significance.

The earliest known match involving a Chittagong Division team was in March 1980 when they played Rajshahi Division in an Inter-Divisional Championship competition. In March 1986, they took part in a National Cricket Championship and reached the quarter-final stage. These were not first-class competitions and it was not until the late 1990s, after Bangladesh had made progress in international cricket, that there was any possibility of first-class cricket at the domestic level.

Bangladesh won the 1997 ICC Trophy and so qualified for the 1999 Cricket World Cup. There was then the very real prospect (realised in 2000) of the country being admitted to full membership of the International Cricket Council (the ICC) and so steps were taken to create an organised national championship. The result was the NCL which began in the 1999–2000 season, though it did not have first-class status until the 2000–01 season. It was decided that the NCL teams should represent each of the country's six (at that time) administrative divisions and so a Chittagong Division team was formed, playing its matches at the M. A. Aziz Stadium in Chittagong, the Comilla Stadium in Comilla and the Niaz Mohammad Stadium in Brahmanbaria. Chittagong Division won the 1999–2000 championship.

In 2000–01, Chittagong Division became a first-class team and has continued to compete in the NCL but with no further titles to 2016. The List A One-Day Cricket League began in 2000–01 and ran until 2010–11 when it was terminated. Chittagong Division won the competition once, in 2003–04.

Chittagong played in the Bangladesh NCL (National Cricket League) Twenty20 tournament which was staged for one season only, 2009–10, and used the name Cyclones of Chittagong (CC). The team's official colours were blue and white. Though captained by Nafees Iqbal and featuring Tamim Iqbal, the Cyclones were unsuccessful. They lost four of their five games and finished fifth in the six-team league.

== Venues ==
Chittagong Division currently plays its home matches at Bir Shrestho Flight Lieutenant Matiur Rahman Cricket Stadium. The team has historically utilized various district stadiums for the FC and List A fixtures.

Home ground locations within Bangladesh

Stadium	Location	Details
Bir Shrestho Flight Lieutenant Matiur Rahman Cricket Stadium	Chittagong	Primary home ground since 2006. Also known as BSFLMRCS, it is a regular venue for international Test and ODI cricket.
District Stadium, Chittagong	Chittagong	Formerly the M. A. Aziz Stadium, it served as the main home ground until 2005 and is the venue of Bangladesh’s first-ever Test victory.
Shaheed Dhirendranath Datta Stadium	Comilla	Commonly called Comilla Stadium, it hosted 11 First-class and 11 List A matches for the division between 2000 and 2004.
Shaheed Bulu Stadium	Noakhali	A regional venue that hosted 1 First-class and 1 List A match in the 2000–01 season.
Niaz Mohammad Stadium	Brahmanbaria	One of the original venues during the team's inaugural 1999–2000 season. It only hosted 1 First-class match.

== Results in National Cricket League ==
- 1999–2000: seven wins in 10 matches, champions
- 2000–01: five wins in 10 matches, finished second
- 2001–02: two wins in 10 matches, finished third
- 2002–03: three wins in six matches, finished third
- 2003–04: one win in 10 matches, finished fifth
- 2004–05: two wins in 10 matches, finished fourth
- 2005–06: four wins in 10 matches, finished second
- 2006–07: one win in 10 matches, finished third
- 2007–08: four wins in 10 matches, finished fourth
- 2008–09: one win in 10 matches, finished fifth
- 2009–10: five wins in nine matches, finished second
- 2010–11: no wins in five matches, finished sixth (last)
- 2011–12: three wins in seven matches, finished fifth
- 2012–13: two wins in seven matches, finished sixth
- 2013–14: one win in seven matches, finished sixth
- 2014–15: no wins in seven matches, finished eighth (last)
- 2015–16: no wins in six matches, finished third in Tier 2
- 2016–17: no wins in six matches, finished fourth (last) in Tier 2
- 2017–18: no wins in six matches, finished equal fourth in Tier 2
- 2018–19: one win in six matches, finished third in Tier 2
- 2019-20: one win in six matches, finished fourth in Tier 2

== See also ==
- List of Chittagong Division cricketers
