= Rajshahi Division cricket team =

Bangladeshi first-class cricket team

Rajshahi Division Cricket Team
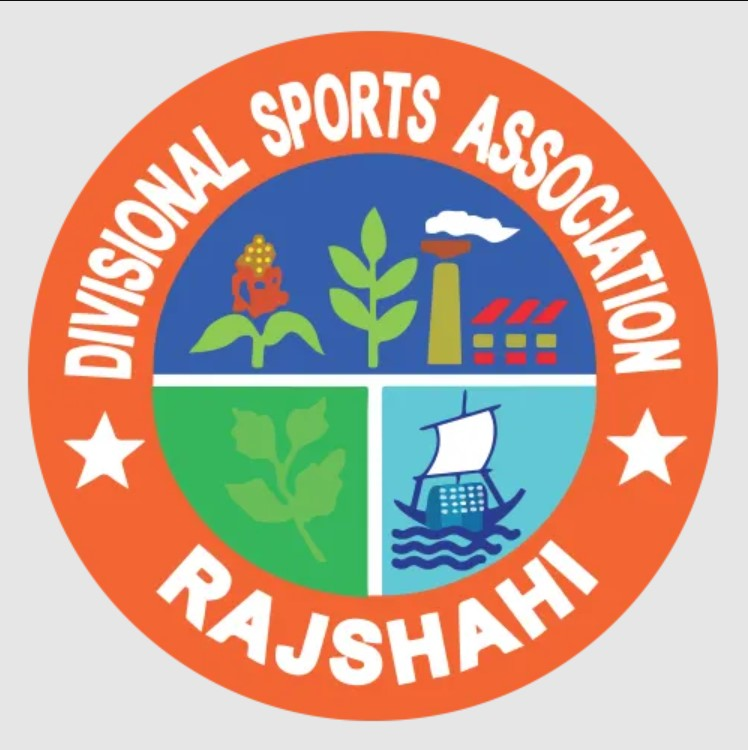

Personnel
- Captain: Najmul Hossain Shanto

Team information
- Founded: 1999
- Home ground: Shaheed Qamaruzzaman Stadium
- Capacity: 15,000

History
- NCL wins: 2
- One Day Cricket League wins: 4
- NCL T20 wins: 1
- BPL wins: 2

The Rajshahi Division cricket team is a Bangladeshi first-class team representing the Rajshahi Division, one of the country's eight administrative divisions. The team competes in the National Cricket League and National Cricket League Twenty20. They were formerly a participant in the now-defunct National Cricket League One-Day. While the team originally adopted the name Rajshahi Rangers for the inaugural NCL T20 season in 2010, it returned to the format under the divisional name for the 2024–25 NCL T20 revival. Rajshahi played in their official grey, black, and red colours. The equivalent team in the Bangladesh Premier League (BPL) is the Rajshahi Warriors.

Rajshahi's main home ground is the Rajshahi Divisional Stadium in Rajshahi city, which has a 15,000 capacity. They have won the NCL twice, most recently in 2008–09. They won the One-Day League four times and, as the Rangers, were the winners of the NCL T20 in 2010.

They recorded their biggest victory in a first-class match when they defeated Chittagong Division by an innings and 242 runs in the 2016–17 National Cricket League.

== Honours ==
- National Cricket League (2) – 2005–06, 2008–09
- One-Day Cricket League (4) – 2004–05, 2005–06, 2007–08, 2010–11
- NCL T20 (1) – 2009–10

== Current squad ==
As of 10 December 2024

The squad for the 2024–25 season was:

| Name | Batting style | Bowling style | Notes |
Batsman
| Junaid Siddique | Left-hand bat | Right-arm off break | |
| Sabbir Rahman | Right-hand bat | Right-arm leg break | |
| Farhad Hossain | Right-hand bat | Right-arm off break | |
| Mizanur Rahman | Right-hand bat | Right-arm off break | |
| Najmul Hossain Shanto | Left-hand bat | Right-arm off break | |
| Myshukur Rahaman | Right-hand bat | | |
Wicketkeepers
| Pritom Kumar | Right-hand bat | | Captain |
| Hamidul Islam | Right-hand bat | | |
Spin Bowlers
| Sunzamul Islam | Left-hand bat | Slow left-arm orthodox | |
| Taijul Islam | Left-hand bat | Slow left-arm orthodox | |
| Saqlain Sajib | Left-hand bat | Slow left-arm orthodox | |
| Abdul Gaffar | Right-hand bat | Right-arm off break | |
Pace Bowlers
| Farhad Reza | Right-hand bat | Right-arm fast-medium | |
| Muktar Ali | Right-hand bat | Right-arm medium-fast | |
| Shafiqul Islam | Right-hand bat | Left-arm medium | |
| Shafiul Islam | Right-hand bat | Right-arm fast-medium | |
| Delwar Hossain | Right-hand bat | Right-arm medium | |
| Mohor Sheikh | Right-hand bat | Right-arm medium | |

== Notes ==
- Wisden Cricketers Almanack (annual)
