= List of Bangladesh Test cricket records =

Test cricket records from Bangladesh

Test cricket is the oldest form of cricket played at international level. A Test match is scheduled to take place over a period of five days, (Note: For the first 50 years of Test cricket matches were played over three or four days and until the 1930s some timeless Tests were played.) (Note: In October 2017, the ICC Board approved a trial of four-day Test cricket to run through until the 2019 Cricket World Cup.) and is played by teams representing full member nations of the International Cricket Council (ICC). Bangladesh became a full-member in 2000 after playing their first Test match against India at the Bangabandhu National Stadium. They have played a total of 150 matches.

== Key ==
The top five records are listed for each category, except for the team wins, losses, draws and ties and the partnership records. Tied records for fifth place are also included. Explanations of the general symbols and cricketing terms used in the list are given below. Specific details are provided in each category where appropriate. All records include matches played for Australia only, and are correct as of January 2020.

Key
Symbol	Meaning
†	Player or umpire is currently active in Test cricket
*	Player remained not out or partnership remained unbroken
♠	Test cricket record
d	Innings was declared (e.g. 8/758d)
Date	Starting date of the Test match
Innings	Number of innings played
Matches	Number of matches played
Opposition	The team Bangladesh was playing against
Period	The time period when the player was active in Test cricket
Player	The player involved in the record
Venue	Test cricket ground where the match was played

== Team records ==
=== Overall Record ===
Mat	Won	Lost	Drawn	Tied	Win %
160	28	113	19	0	17.5
Last Updated: 16 August 2026

=== Team wins, losses, draws and ties ===
As of 17 March 2026, Bangladesh played 158 Test matches resulting in 27 victories, 112 defeats and 19 draws for an overall winning percentage of 17.31.

Opponent	Matches	Won	Lost	Tied	Draw	% Won	% Lost	% Draw	First	Last
Afghanistan	2	1	1	0	0	50.00	50.00	0.00	2019	2023
Australia	7	2	5	0	0	28.57	71.43	0.00	2003	2026
England	10	1	9	0	0	10.00	90.00	0.00	2003	2017
India	15	0	13	0	2	0.00	86.66	13.33	2000	2024
Ireland	3	3	0	0	0	100.00	0.00	0.00	2023	2025
New Zealand	19	2	14	0	3	10.52	73.68	15.78	2001	2023
Pakistan	17	4	12	0	1	23.53	70.58	6.67	2001	2026
South Africa	16	0	13	0	2	0.00	81.25	12.50	2002	2022
Sri Lanka	28	1	21	0	6	3.57	75.00	21.42	2001	2025
West Indies	22	5	15	0	2	20.00	70.00	10.00	2002	2022
Zimbabwe	20	9	8	0	3	44.44	38.88	16.66	2001	2021
Total	158	27	112	0	19	17.09	70.89	12.03	2000	2025
Statistics are correct as of Bangladesh v Australia at Darwin, 1st Test, August 13-16, 2026

=== First Test series wins ===
Opponent	Home- Year	Away- Year
Afghanistan	2023	YTP
Australia	–	
England	–	
India	–	
Ireland	2023	YTP
New Zealand	–	
Pakistan	2026	2024
South Africa	–	
Sri Lanka	–	
West Indies	2018	2009
Zimbabwe	2005	2021
Last updated: May 13, 2026

=== First Test match wins ===
Opponent	Home		Away	
Opponent	Venue	Year	Venue	Year
Afghanistan	Mirpur	2023	YTP	
Australia	Mirpur	2017	Darwin	2026
England	Mirpur	2016	–	
India	–			
Ireland	Mirpur	2023	YTP	
New Zealand	Sylhet	2023	Mount Maunganui	2022
Pakistan	Mirpur	2026	Rawalpindi	2024
South Africa	–			
Sri Lanka	–		Colombo	2017
West Indies	Chittagong	2018	Kingstown	2009
Zimbabwe	Chittagong	2005	Harare	2013
Last updated: Sep 3, 2024

=== Team scoring records ===
==== Highest runs in an innings ====
The highest innings total in a Test match is 952/6d which was posted by Sri Lanka against India in August, 1997 at Colombo. The first Test of the 2012–13 series against the Sri Lanka saw Bangladesh set their highest innings total of 638.

Rank	Score	Opposition	Venue	Date
1	638	Sri Lanka	Galle International Stadium, Galle, Sri Lanka	8 March 2013
2	595/8d	New Zealand	Basin Reserve, Wellington, New Zealand	12 January 2017
3	565	Pakistan	Rawalpindi Cricket Stadium, Rawalpindi, Pakistan	21 August 2024
4	560/6d	Zimbabwe	Sher-e-Bangla National Stadium, Mirpur, Bangladesh	22 February 2020
5	556	West Indies	Sher-e-Bangla National Stadium, Mirpur, Bangladesh	13 November 2012
Last updated: 14 November 2024

==== Fewest runs in an innings ====
The lowest score in the history of test cricket was scored by New Zealand. New Zealand scored just 26 against England in a match in Auckland in March, 1955. The lowest score in for Bangladesh is 43 scored in their first innings against West Indies in the first Test of the Bangladesh in the West Indies in 2018.

Rank	Score	Opposition	Venue	Date
1	43	West Indies	Sir Vivian Richards Stadium, North Sound, West Indies	4 July 2018
2	53	South Africa	Kingsmead Cricket Ground, Durban, South Africa	31 March 2022
3	62	Sri Lanka	P. Sara Stadium, Colombo, Sri Lanka	3 July 2007
4	64	Australia	Great Barrier Reef Arena, Mackay, Australia	23 August 2026
5	80	South Africa	St. George's Park, Gqeberha, South Africa	8 April 2022
Last updated: 14 November 2024

==== Most runs conceded in an innings ====
The highest innings total scored against Bangladesh is by Sri Lanka when they scored 730/6d in the first Test of the Sri Lanka's tour of Bangladesh in 2014 at Sher-e-Bangla National Stadium.

Rank	Score	Opposition	Venue	Date
1	730/6d	Sri Lanka	Sher-e-Bangla National Stadium, Mirpur, Bangladesh	27 January 2014
2	715/6d	New Zealand	Seddon Park, Hamilton, New Zealand	28 February 2019
3	713/9d	Sri Lanka	Zohur Ahmed Chowdhury Stadium, Chittagong, Bangladesh	31 January 2018
4	687/6d	India	Rajiv Gandhi International Cricket Stadium, Hyderabad, India	9 February 2017
5	648/8d	Sri Lanka	Pallekele International Cricket Stadium, Pallekele, Sri Lanka	21 April 2021
5	648/9d	West Indies	Sheikh Abu Naser Stadium, Khulna, Bangladesh	21 November 2012
Last updated: 14 November 2024

==== Fewest runs conceded in an innings ====
The lowest innings total scored against Bangladesh is 111 by West Indies in the second Test of West Indies tour of Bangladesh in 2018

Rank	Score	Opposition	Venue	Date
1	111	West Indies	Sher-e-Bangla National Stadium, Mirpur, Bangladesh	30 November 2008
2	114	Zimbabwe	Sher-e-Bangla National Stadium, Mirpur, Bangladesh	25 October 2014
3	115	Afghanistan	Sher-e-Bangla National Stadium, Mirpur, Bangladesh	14 June 2023
4	117	West Indies	Sher-e-Bangla National Stadium, Mirpur, Bangladesh	11 February 2021
5	129	West Indies	Sabina Park, Kingston Jamaica	12 July 2018
Last updated: 14 November 2024

=== Result records ===
A Test match is won when one side has scored more runs than the total runs scored by the opposing side during their two innings. If both sides have completed both their allocated innings and the side that fielded last has the higher aggregate of runs, it is known as a win by runs. This indicates the number of runs that they had scored more than the opposing side. If one side scores more runs in a single innings than the total runs scored by the other side in both their innings, it is known as a win by innings and runs. If the side batting last wins the match, it is known as a win by wickets, indicating the number of wickets that were still to fall.

==== Greatest win margins (by innings) ====
Rank	Margin	Opposition	Venue	Date
1	Innings and 184 runs	West Indies	Sher-e-Bangla National Stadium, Mirpur, Bangladesh	2 December 2018
2	Innings and 106 runs	Zimbabwe	Sher-e-Bangla National Stadium, Mirpur, Bangladesh	25 February 2020
Last updated: 14 November 2024

==== Greatest win margins (by runs) ====
Rank	Margin	Opposition	Venue	Date
1	546 runs	Afghanistan	Sher-e-Bangla National Stadium, Mirpur, Bangladesh	14 June 2023
2	226 runs	Zimbabwe	M. A. Aziz Stadium, Chittagong, Bangladesh	6 January 2005
3	220 runs	Zimbabwe	Harare Sports Club, Harare, Zimbabwe	7 July 2021
4	218 runs	Zimbabwe	Sher-e-Bangla National Stadium, Mirpur, Bangladesh	11 November 2018
5	186 runs	Zimbabwe	Zohur Ahmed Chowdhury Stadium, Chittagong, Bangladesh	12 November 2014
Last updated: 14 November 2024

==== Greatest win margins (by wickets) ====
Rank	Score	Margin	Opposition	Venue	Date
1	30/0	10 wickets	Pakistan	Rawalpindi Cricket Stadium, Rawalpindi, Pakistan	21 August 2024
2	57/1	9 wickets	Australia	Marrara Stadium, Darwin, Australia	16 August 2026
3	42/2	8 wickets	New Zealand	Bay Oval, Mount Maunganui, New Zealand	1 January 2022
4	138/3	7 wickets	Ireland	Sher-e-Bangla National Cricket Stadium, Mirpur, Bangladesh	7 April 2023
5	185/4	6 wickets	Pakistan	Rawalpindi Cricket Stadium, Rawalpindi, Pakistan	30 August 2024
Last updated: 16 August 2026

==== Narrowest win margins (by runs) ====
Rank	Margin	Opposition	Venue	Date
1	20 runs	Australia	Sher-e-Bangla National Cricket Stadium, Mirpur, Bangladesh	27 August 2017
2	64 runs	West Indies	Zohur Ahmed Chowdhury Stadium, Chittagong, Bangladesh	22 November 2018
3	95 runs	West Indies	Arnos Vale Stadium, Kingstown, West Indies	9 July 2009
4	104 runs	Pakistan	Sher-e-Bangla National Cricket Stadium, Mirpur, Bangladesh	8 May 2026
5	108 runs	England	Sher-e-Bangla National Cricket Stadium, Mirpur, Bangladesh	28 October 2016
Last updated: 12 May 2026

==== Narrowest win margins (by wickets) ====
Rank	Score	Margin	Opposition	Venue	Date
1	101/7	3 wickets	Zimbabwe	Sher-e-Bangla National Cricket Stadium, Mirpur, Bangladesh	25 October 2005
2	217/6	4 wickets	West Indies	National Cricket Stadium, St George's, West Indies	17 July 2009
2	191/6	4 wickets	Sri Lanka	P. Sara Oval, Colombo, Sri Lanka	15 March 2017
4	185/6	6 wickets	Pakistan	Rawalpindi Cricket Stadium, Rawalpindi, Pakistan	30 Aug 2024
5	138/7	7 wickets	Ireland	Sher-e-Bangla National Stadium, Mirpur, Bangladesh	4 Apr 2023
Last updated: 14 November 2024

==== Greatest loss margins (by innings) ====
Rank	Margin	Opposition	Venue	Date
1	Innings and 310 runs	West Indies	Bangabandhu Stadium, Dhaka, Bangladesh	8 December 2002
2	Innings and 264 runs	Pakistan	Multan Cricket Stadium, Multan, Pakistan	29 August 2001
3	Innings and 261 runs	England	Lord's, London, England	26 May 2005
4	Innings and 254 runs	South Africa	Mangaung Oval, Bloemfontein, South Africa	6 October 2017
5	Innings and 248 runs	Sri Lanka	Sher-e-Bangla National Cricket Stadium, Mirpur, Bangladesh	27 January 2014
Last updated: 25 April 2021

==== Greatest loss margins (by runs) ====
Rank	Margin	Opposition	Venue	Date
1	465 runs	Sri Lanka	Zohur Ahmed Chowdhury Stadium, Chittagong, Bangladesh	3 January 2009
2	335 runs	Zimbabwe	Harare Sports Club, Harare, Zimbabwe	17 April 2013
3	333 runs	South Africa	Senwes Park, Potchefstroom, South Africa	28 September 2017
4	332 runs	South Africa	St George's Park Cricket Ground, Gqeberha, South Africa	8 April 2022
5	329 runs	England	M. A. Aziz Stadium, Chittagong, Bangladesh	29 October 2003
Last updated: 25 April 2022

==== Greatest loss margins (by wickets) ====
Rank	Margin	Winning Score	Opposition	Venue	Date
1	10 wickets	120/0	Sri Lanka	Shaheed Chandu Stadium, Bogra, Bangladesh	8 March 2006
1	10 wickets	2/0	India	Shere-e-Bangla Stadium, Mirpur, Bangladesh	24 January 2010
1	10 wickets	30/0	West Indies	Sheikh Abu Naser Stadium, Khulna, Bangladesh	21 November 2012
1	10 wickets	13/0	West Indies	Arnos Vale Stadium, Kingstown, St. Vincent	9 September 2014
1	10 wickets	29/0	Sri Lanka	Shere-e-Bangla Stadium, Mirpur, Bangladesh	23 May 2022
1	10 wickets	13/0	West Indies	Darren Sammy National Cricket Stadium, Gros Islet, St. Lucia	24 June 2022
Last updated: 19 November 2026

==== Narrowest loss margins (by runs) ====
Rank	Margin	Opposition	Venue	Date
1	17 runs	West Indies	Shere Bangla National Stadium, Mirpur, Bangladesh	11 February 2021
2	22 runs	England	Zohur Ahmed Chowdhury Stadium, Chittagong, Bangladesh	20 October 2016
3	77 runs	West Indies	Sher-e-Bangla National Cricket Stadium, Mirpur, Bangladesh	13 November 2012
4	107 runs	Sri Lanka	Sher-e-Bangla National Cricket Stadium, Mirpur, Bangladesh	26 December 2008
5	113 runs	India	Zohur Ahmed Chowdhury Stadium, Chittagong, Bangladesh	17 January 2010
Last updated: 25 April 2021

==== Narrowest loss margins (by wickets) ====
Rank	Margin	Opposition	Venue	Date
1	1 wicket	Pakistan	Multan Cricket Stadium, Multan, Pakistan	3 September 2003
2	3 wickets	Australia	Khan Shaheb Osman Ali Stadium, Fatullah, Narayanganj, Bangladesh	9 April 2006
2	3 wickets	New Zealand	Zohur Ahmed Chowdhury Stadium, Chittagong, Bangladesh	17 October 2008
2	3 wickets	West Indies	Zohur Ahmed Chowdhury Stadium, Chittagong, Bangladesh	3 February 2021
2	3 wickets	India	Sher-e-Bangla National Cricket Stadium, Mirpur, Bangladesh	22 December 2022
2	3 wickets	Zimbabwe	Sylhet International Cricket Stadium, Sylhet, Bangladesh	20 April 2025
Last updated: 19 November 2026

== Batting records ==
=== Most career runs ===
A run is the basic means of scoring in cricket. A run is scored when the batsman hits the ball with his bat and with his partner runs the length of 22 yards (20 m) of the pitch.

Rank	Runs	Player	Matches	Innings	Period
1	6,799	Mushfiqur Rahim†	103	189	2005–2026
2	5,134	Tamim Iqbal	70	134	2008–2023
3	5,137	Mominul Haque†	78	145	2013–2026
4	4,609	Shakib Al Hasan	71	130	2007–2024
5	3,356	Litton Das†	55	95	2015–2026
6	3,026	Habibul Bashar	50	99	2000–2008
7	2,914	Mahmudullah	50	94	2009–2021
8	2,737	Mohammad Ashraful	61	119	2001–2013
9	2,614	Najmul Hossain Shanto†	42	78	2017–2026
10	2,296	Mehidy Hasan Miraz†	59	105	2016–2026
Last updated: 16 August 2026

=== Most runs in each batting position ===
Batting position	Batsman	Innings	Runs	Average	Test Career Span	Ref
Opener	Tamim Iqbal†	133	5,095	38.89	2008–2023	
Number 3	Habibul Bashar	80	2,523	31.93	2000–2008	
Number 4	Mominul Haque†	63	2,367	41.52	2013–2024	
Number 5	Mushfiqur Rahim†	58	2,377	45.90	2007–2026	
Number 6	Mushfiqur Rahim†	59	1,935	34.55	2005–2024	
Number 7	Litton Das†	28	1,081	40.03	2015–2024	
Number 8	Mehidy Hasan Miraz†	52	1,097	23.84	2016–2024	
Number 9	Mohammad Rafique	32	483	16.65	2000–2008	
Number 10	Tapash Baisya	21	254	14.94	2002–2005	
Number 11	Rubel Hossain	26	95	7.91	2009–2017	
Last updated: 28 November 2024.

=== Fastest to multiples of 1,000 career runs ===
Runs	Batter	Innings	Record Date	Ref
1,000	Aminul Islam		2001	
2,000	Habibul Bashar		2003	
3,000	Habibul Bashar		2004	
4,000	Habibul Bashar		2006	
5,000	Habibul Bashar		2007	
6,000	Mohammad Ashraful		2011	
7,000	Tamim Iqbal		2014	
8,000	Tamim Iqbal		2015	
9,000	Tamim Iqbal		2016	
10,000	Tamim Iqbal		2017	
11,000	Tamim Iqbal		2018	
12,000	Tamim Iqbal		2018	
13,000	Tamim Iqbal		2020	
14,000	Tamim Iqbal		2021	
15,000	Tamim Iqbal		2023	
16,000	Mushfiqur Rahim		2026	

=== Most runs against each team ===
Opposition	Runs	Player	Matches	Innings	Period	Ref
Afghanistan	270	Najmul Hossain Shanto†	1	2	2023–2023	
Australia	282	Habibul Bashar	4	8	2003–2006	
England	736	Tamim Iqbal†	6	12	2010–2016	
India	673	Mushfiqur Rahim†	10	19	2010–2024	
Ireland	177	Mushfiqur Rahim†	1	2	2023–2023	
New Zealand	908	Tamim Iqbal†	11	20	2008–2019	
Pakistan	819	Mushfiqur Rahim†	10	19	2011–2026	
South Africa	436	Mushfiqur Rahim†	12	22	2008–2024	
Sri Lanka	1,619	Mushfiqur Rahim†	19	34	2006–2025	
West Indies	954	Tamim Iqbal†	14	28	2009–2022	
Zimbabwe	905	Mushfiqur Rahim†	12	21	2011–2024	
Last updated: 28 June 2025.

=== Highest individual score ===
Rank	Runs	Player	Opposition	Venue	Date
1	242*	Towhid Hridoy	West Indies	Sylhet International Cricket Stadium, Sylhet, Bangladesh	5 November 2026
2	219*	Mushfiqur Rahim	Zimbabwe	Sher-e-Bangla National Cricket Stadium, Mirpur, Bangladesh	11 November 2018
3	217	Shakib Al Hasan	New Zealand	Basin Reserve, Wellington, New Zealand	12 January 2017
4	206	Tamim Iqbal	Pakistan	Sheikh Abu Naser Stadium, Khulna, Bangladesh	28 April 2015
5	203*	Mushfiqur Rahim	Zimbabwe	Sher-e-Bangla National Cricket Stadium, Mirpur, Bangladesh	22 February 2020
Last updated: 19 November 2026

=== Highest individual score against each team ===
Opposition	Runs	Player	Venue	Date	Ref
Afghanistan	146	Najmul Hossain Shanto	Sher-e-Bangla National Cricket Stadium, Mirpur, Bangladesh	14 June 2023	
Australia	138	Shahriar Nafees	Khan Shaheb Osman Ali Stadium, Fatullah, Bangladesh	9 April 2006	
England	108	Tamim Iqbal	Old Trafford, Manchester, England	4 June 2010	
India	158*	Mohammad Ashraful	Zahur Ahmed Chowdhury Stadium, Chattogram, Bangladesh	17 December 2004	
Ireland	126	Mushfiqur Rahim	Sher-e-Bangla National Cricket Stadium, Mirpur, Bangladesh	4 April 2023	
New Zealand	217	Shakib Al Hasan	Basin Reserve, Wellington, New Zealand	12 January 2017	
Pakistan	206	Tamim Iqbal	Sheikh Abu Naser Stadium, Khulna, Bangladesh	28 April 2015	
South Africa	137	Mahmudul Hasan	Kingsmead, Durban, South Africa	2 April 2022	
South Africa	137	Towhid Hridoy	Wanderers Stadium, Johannesburg, South Africa	15 November 2026	
Sri Lanka	200	Mushfiqur Rahim	Galle International Stadium, Galle, Sri Lanka	8 March 2013	
West Indies	242*	Towhid Hridoy	Sylhet International Cricket Stadium, Sylhet, Bangladesh	5 November 2026	
Zimbabwe	219*	Mushfiqur Rahim	Sher-e-Bangla National Cricket Stadium, Mirpur, Bangladesh	11 November 2018	
Last updated: 19 November 2026

=== Highest individual score – progression of record ===
Runs	Player	Opponent	Venue	Season
145	Aminul Islam	India	Bangabandhu National Stadium, Dhaka, Bangladesh	2000-01
158*	Mohammad Ashraful	India	MA Aziz Stadium, Chittagong, Bangladesh	2004-05
200	Mushfiqur Rahim†	Sri Lanka	Galle International Stadium, Galle, Sri Lanka	2012-13
206	Tamim Iqbal	Pakistan	Sheikh Abu Naser Stadium, Khulna, Bangladesh	2015
217	Shakib Al Hasan	New Zealand	Basin Reserve, Wellington, New Zealand	2016-17
219*	Mushfiqur Rahim†	Zimbabwe	Sher-e-Bangla National Cricket Stadium, Mirpur, Bangladesh	2018-19
242*	Towhid Hridoy†	West Indies	Sylhet International Cricket Stadium, Sylhet, Bangladesh	2026-17
Last updated: 19 November 2026

=== Highest career average ===
A batsman's batting average is the total number of runs they have scored divided by the number of times they have been dismissed.

Rank	Average	Player	Runs	Innings	Not out	Period
1	39.28	Mushfiqur Rahim†	6,799	189	16	2005–2026
2	38.89	Tamim Iqbal	5,134	134	2	2008–2023
3	38.22	Mominul Haque†	5,117	144	10	2013–2026
4	37.77	Shakib Al Hasan	4,609	130	8	2007–2024
5	36.16	Litton Das†	3,356	95	2	2015–2026
Qualification: 20 innings. Last updated: 16 August 2026

=== Highest average in each batting position ===
Batting position	Batsman	Innings	Runs	Average	Career Span	Ref
Opener	Tamim Iqbal	133	5,095	38.89	2008–2023	
Number 3	Mominul Haque†	70	2,403	35.86	2014–2025	
Number 4	Mominul Haque†	63	2,367	41.52	2013–2024	
Number 5	Mushfiqur Rahim†	67	2,844	47.40	2007–2025	
Number 6	Mahmudullah	20	689	43.06	2009–2021	
Number 7	Litton Das†	28	1,081	40.03	2015–2024	
Number 8	Khaled Mashud	20	425	25.00	2000–2007	
Number 9	Mohammad Rafique	32	483	16.65	2000–2008	
Number 10	Tapash Baisya	21	254	14.94	2002–2007	
Number 11	Rubel Hossain	26	95	7.91	2009–2017	
Last updated: 17 March 2026. Qualification: Min 20 innings batted at position

=== Most half-centuries ===
A half-century is a score of between 50 and 99 runs. Statistically, once a batsman's score reaches 100, it is no longer considered a half-century but a century.

Rank	Half centuries	Player	Innings	Period
1	31	Shakib Al Hasan	130	2007–2024
1	31	Tamim Iqbal†	134	2008–2023
2	29	Mushfiqur Rahim†	188	2005–2026
3	27	Mominul Haque†	143	2013–2026
4	24	Habibul Bashar	99	2000–2008
Last updated: 17 March 2026

=== Most centuries ===
A century is a score of 100 or more runs in a single innings.

Rank	Centuries	Player	Innings	Period
1	14	Mushfiqur Rahim†	199	2005–2026
2	13	Mominul Haque†	154	2013–2026
3	10	Tamim Iqbal	134	2008–2023
4	9	Najmul Hossain Shanto†	90	2017–2026
5	8	Litton Das	105	2015–2026
Last updated: 19 November 2026

=== Most double centuries ===
A double century is a score of 200 or more runs in a single innings.

Rank	Double centuries	Player	Innings	Period
1	3	Mushfiqur Rahim†	199	2005–2025
2	1	Shakib Al Hasan	130	2007–2024
2	1	Tamim Iqbal	134	2008–2023
2	1	Towhid Hridoy	8	2026–2026
Last updated: 19 November 2026.

=== Most Sixes ===
Rank	Sixes	Player	Innings	Period
1	41	Tamim Iqbal	134	2008-2023
2	39	Mushfiqur Rahim†	199	2005–2026
3	36	Najmul Hossain Shanto{†	90	2017–2026
4	34	Mohammad Rafique	63	2000–2008
5	28	Shakib Al Hasan	130	2007–2024
Last updated: 19 November 2026

=== Most Fours ===
Rank	Fours	Player	Innings	Period
1	810	Mushfiqur Rahim†	199	2005–2026
2	655	Tamim Iqbal	134	2008–2023
3	610	Mominul Haque†	154	2013–2026
4	556	Shakib Al Hasan	130	2007–2024
5	446	Litton Das†	105	2015–2026
Last updated: 19 November 2026

=== Most runs in a series ===
Rank	Runs	Player	Matches	Innings	Series
1	379	Habibul Bashar	3	6	Bangladesh in Pakistan in 2003
2	376	Mominul Haque†	2	4	New Zealand in Bangladesh in 2013
3	321	Mominul Haque†	3	6	Zimbabwe in Bangladesh in 2014
4	314	Mominul Haque†	2	4	Sri Lanka in Bangladesh in 2018
5	308	Tamim Iqbal	3	6	Zimbabwe in Bangladesh in 2014
Last updated: 17 March 2026

=== Most ducks ===
A duck refers to a batsman being dismissed without scoring a run. Glenn McGrath has scored the equal third-highest number of ducks in Test cricket behind Courtney Walsh with 43 and Chris Martin with 36.

Rank	Ducks	Player	Matches	Innings	Period
1	20	Mominul Haque†	83	154	2013–2026
2	16	Mohammad Ashraful	61	119	2001–2013
2	16	Khaled Ahmed	18	31	2018–2026
4	15	Mushfiqur Rahim†	108	199	2005–2026
5	13	Taijul Islam†	65	108	2014–2026
5	13	Ebadot Hossain†	27	43	2019–2026
Last updated: 19 November 2026

=== Highest partnerships by wicket ===
In cricket, two batsmen are always present at the crease batting together in a partnership. This partnership will continue until one of them is dismissed, retires or the innings comes to a close.

A wicket partnership describes the number of runs scored before each wicket falls. The first wicket partnership is between the opening batsmen and continues until the first wicket falls. The second wicket partnership then commences between the not out batsman and the number three batsman. This partnership continues until the second wicket falls. The third wicket partnership then commences between the not out batsman and the new batsman. This continues down to the tenth wicket partnership. When the tenth wicket has fallen, there is no batsman left to partner so the innings is closed.

Wicket	Runs	Player 1	Player 2	Opposition	Ground	Date
1st	312	Tamim Iqbal†	Imrul Kayes	Pakistan	Sheikh Abu Naser Stadium, Khulna	28 April 2015
2nd	232	Shamsur Rahman	Imrul Kayes	Sri Lanka	Zohur Ahmed Chowdhury Stadium, Chittagong	6 February 2014
3rd	242	Mominul Haque†	Najmul Hossain Shanto†	Sri Lanka	Pallekele International Cricket Stadium, Kandy	21 April 2021
4th	266	Mominul Haque†	Mushfiqur Rahim†	Zimbabwe	Sher-e-Bangla National Cricket Stadium, Dhaka	11 November 2018
5th	359	Shakib Al Hasan†	Mushfiqur Rahim†	New Zealand	Basin Reserve, Wellington	13 January 2017
6th	272	Litton Das†	Mushfiqur Rahim†	Sri Lanka	Sher-e-Bangla National Cricket Stadium, Dhaka	23 May 2022
7th	196	Mehidy Hasan Miraz†	Mushfiqur Rahim†	Pakistan	Rawalpindi Cricket Stadium, Rawalpindi	21 August 2024
8th	144*	Mushfiqur Rahim†	Mehedi Hasan†	Zimbabwe	Sher-e-Bangla National Cricket Stadium, Dhaka	11 November 2018
9th	191	Mahmudullah	Taskin Ahmed	Zimbabwe	Harare Sports Club, Harare, Zimbabwe	7 July 2021
10th	69	Mohammad Rafique	Shahadat Hossain	Australia	Zohur Ahmed Chowdhury Stadium, Chittagong	16 April 2006
Last updated: 21 August 2024

=== Highest partnerships by runs ===
Runs	Player 1	Player 2	Wicket	Opposition	Ground	Date
359	Shakib Al Hasan	Mushfiqur Rahim	5th	New Zealand	Basin Reserve, Wellington	13 January 2017
312	Tamim Iqbal	Imrul Kayes	1st	Pakistan	Sheikh Abu Naser Stadium, Khulna	28 April 2015
272	Litton Das	Mushfiqur Rahim	6th	Sri Lanka	Sher-e-Bangla National Cricket Stadium, Mirpur	23 May 2022
267	Mohammad Ashraful	Mushfiqur Rahim	5th	Sri Lanka	Galle International Stadium, Galle	8 March 2013
266	Mominul Haque	Mushfiqur Rahim	4th	Zimbabwe	Sher-e-Bangla National Cricket Stadium, Dhaka	11 November 2018
Last updated: 22 May 2022

=== Highest overall partnership runs by a pair ===
Rank	Runs	Innings	Players	Highest	Average	100/50	Span
1	2,863	70	Mushfiqur Rahim & Shakib Al Hasan	359	41.49	5/17	2008-2024
2	2,433	58	Imrul Kayes & Tamim Iqbal	312	43.44	4/11	2008-2018
3	1,713	36	Mominul Haque & Mushfiqur Rahim †	266	47.58	4/4	2013-2026
4	1,512	24	Litton Das & Mushfiqur Rahim †	272	63.00	5/5	2017-2026
5	1,386	30	Mominul Haque & Tamim Iqbal †	170	47.79	4/7	2013-2023
An asterisk (*) signifies an unbroken partnership (i.e. neither of the batsmen was dismissed before either the end of the allotted overs or the required score being reached). Last updated: 2 October 2024

== Bowling records ==
=== Most career wickets ===
A bowler takes the wicket of a batsman when the form of dismissal is bowled, caught, leg before wicket, stumped or hit wicket. If the batsman is dismissed by run out, obstructing the field, handling the ball, hitting the ball twice or timed out the bowler does not receive credit.

Rank	Wickets	Player	Matches	Innings	Average	Period
1	264	Taijul Islam†	60	108	31.17	2014–2026
2	246	Shakib Al Hasan	71	121	31.72	2007–2024
3	224	Mehidy Hasan Miraz†	59	104	33.10	2016–2026
4	100	Mohammad Rafique	33	48	40.76	2000–2008
5	78	Mashrafe Mortaza	36	51	41.52	2001–2009
Last updated: 17 March 2026

=== Fastest to multiples of 50 wickets ===
Wickets	Bowler	Matches	Record Date	Reference
50	Mehidy Hasan Miraz	12		
100	Mehidy Hasan Miraz	24		
150	Taijul Islam	36	8 April 2022	
200	Taijul Islam	48		
250	Taijul Islam	57		

=== Most wickets against each team ===
Opposition	Wickets	Player	Matches	Innings	Average	Period	Ref
Afghanistan	8	Taijul Islam†	2	4	28.5	2023–2023	
Australia	12	Shakib Al Hasan	2	4	22.5	2017–2017	
England	29	Shakib Al Hasan	6	11	29.27	2010–2016	
India	25	Shakib Al Hasan	10	16	40.88	2007–2024	
Ireland	9	Taijul Islam†	1	2	16.00	2023–2023	
New Zealand	26	Shakib Al Hasan	8	14	28.92	2008–2017	
Pakistan	35	Taijul Islam†	7	10	37.23	2015–2026	
South Africa	23	Taijul Islam†	5	8	33.52	2015–2024	
Sri Lanka	42	Shakib Al Hasan	10	18	37.23	2007–2024	
West Indies	47	Mehidy Hasan Miraz†	10	18	22.27	2018–2024	
West Indies	47	Shakib Al Hasan	13	22	26.08	2009–2022	
Zimbabwe	41	Taijul Islam†	6	12	22.12	2014–2020	
Last updated: 4 December 2024

=== Best figures in an innings ===
Bowling figures refers to the number of the wickets a bowler has taken and the number of runs conceded.

Rank	Figures	Player	Opposition	Venue	Date
1	8/39	Taijul Islam	Zimbabwe	Sher-e-Bangla National Cricket Stadium, Mirpur, Bangladesh	25 October 2014
2	7/36	Shakib Al Hasan	New Zealand	Zohur Ahmed Chowdhury Stadium, Chittagong, Bangladesh	17 October 2008
3	7/58	Mehidy Hasan Miraz	West Indies	Sher-e-Bangla National Cricket Stadium, Mirpur, Bangladesh	30 November 2018
4	7/95	Enamul Haque Jr	Zimbabwe	Bangabandhu National Stadium, Dhaka, Bangladesh	14 January 2005
5	7/116	Taijul Islam	Pakistan	Zohur Ahmed Chowdhury Stadium, Chittagong, Bangladesh	26 November 2021
Last updated: 8 December 2021

=== Best bowling figures against each team ===
Opposition	Figures	Player	Venue	Date	Ref
Afghanistan	4/37	Taskin Ahmed	Sher-e-Bangla National Cricket Stadium, Mirpur, Bangladesh	14 June 2023	
Australia	6/55	Hasan Mahmud	Marrara Stadium, Darwin, Australia	16 August 2026	
England	6/77	Mehidy Hasan	Sher-e-Bangla National Cricket Stadium, Mirpur, Bangladesh	28 October 2016	
India	6/132	Naimur Rahman	Bangabandhu National Stadium, Dhaka, Bangladesh	10 November 2000	
Ireland	5/58	Taijul Islam	Sher-e-Bangla National Stadium, Mirpur, Bangladesh	4 April 2023	
New Zealand	7/36	Shakib Al Hasan	Zahur Ahmed Chowdhury Stadium, Chattogram, Bangladesh	17 October 2008	
Pakistan	7/116	Taijul Islam	Zahur Ahmed Chowdhury Stadium, Chattogram, Bangladesh	28 November 2021	
South Africa	6/27	Shahadat Hossain	Sher-e-Bangla National Cricket Stadium, Mirpur, Bangladesh	22 February 2008	
Sri Lanka	5/70	Shakib Al Hasan	Sher-e-Bangla National Cricket Stadium, Mirpur, Bangladesh	26 December 2008	
West Indies	7/58	Mehidy Hasan	Sher-e-Bangla National Cricket Stadium, Mirpur, Bangladesh	30 November 2018	
Zimbabwe	8/39	Taijul Islam	Sher-e-Bangla National Cricket Stadium, Mirpur, Bangladesh	2 October 2014	
Last updated: 16 August 2026

=== Best figures in a match ===
A bowler's bowling figures in a match are the sum of the wickets taken and the runs conceded over both innings.

Rank	Figures	Player	Opposition	Venue	Date
1	12/117	Mehidy Hasan Miraz†	West Indies	Sher-e-Bangla National Cricket Stadium, Mirpur, Bangladesh	30 November 2018
2	12/159	Mehidy Hasan Miraz†	England	Sher-e-Bangla National Cricket Stadium, Mirpur, Bangladesh	28 October 2016
3	12/200	Enamul Haque Jr	Zimbabwe	Bangabandhu National Stadium, Dhaka, Bangladesh	14 January 2005
4	11/170	Taijul Islam†	Zimbabwe	Sylhet International Cricket Stadium, Sylhet, Bangladesh	3 November 2018
5	10/102	Mehidy Hasan Miraz†	Zimbabwe	Sylhet International Cricket Stadium, Sylhet, Bangladesh	20 April 2025
Last updated: 17 March 2026

=== Best career average ===
A bowler's bowling average is the total number of runs they have conceded divided by the number of wickets they have taken.

Rank	Average	Player	Wickets	Runs	Balls	Period
1	28.56	Nayeem Hasan†	48	1,371	2,656	2018–2025
2	31.17	Taijul Islam†	254	7,918	15,310	2014–2026
3	31.72	Shakib Al Hasan	246	7,804	15,675	2007–2024
4	33.10	Mehidy Hasan Miraz†	216	7,150	13,164	2016–2025
5	36.74	Mustafizur Rahman	31	1,139	2,145	2015–2022
Qualification: 2,000 balls. Last updated: 17 March 2026

=== Best career economy rate ===
A bowler's economy rate is the total number of runs they have conceded divided by the number of overs they have bowled.

Rank	Economy rate	Player	Wickets	Runs	Balls	Period
1	2.76	Enamul Haque	18	1,027	2,230	2003–2013
2	2.79	Mohammad Rafique	100	4,076	8,744	2000–2008
3	2.98	Shakib Al Hasan	246	7,804	15,675	2007–2024
4	3.01	Enamul Haque Jr	44	1,787	3,555	2003–2013
5	3.02	Taijul Islam†	196	6,315	12,511	2014–2023
Qualification: 2,000 balls. Last updated: 2 October 2024

=== Best career strike rate ===
A bowler's strike rate is the total number of balls they have bowled divided by the number of wickets they have taken.

Rank	Strike rate	Player	Wickets	Runs	Balls	Period
1	55.33	Nayeem Hasan†	48	1,371	2,656	2018–2025
2	61.24	Taijul Islam†	250	7,765	15,310	2014–2025
3	62.68	Mehidy Hasan Miraz†	210	6,820	13,164	2016–2025
4	63.71	Shakib Al Hasan	246	7,804	15,675	2007–2024
5	64.81	Taskin Ahmed†	49	1,924	3,176	2017–2024
Qualification: 2,000 balls. Last updated: 17 March 2026

=== Most five-wicket hauls ===
A five-wicket haul refers to a bowler taking five wickets in a single innings.

Rank	Five-wicket hauls	Player	Innings	Balls	Wickets	Period
1	19	Shakib Al Hasan	121	15,675	246	2007–2024
2	13	Taijul Islam†	108	12,511	196	2014–2026
3	11	Mehidy Hasan Miraz†	104	11,356	183	2016–2026
4	7	Mohammad Rafique	48	8,744	100	2000–2008
5	4	Shahadat Hossain	60	5,380	72	2005–2015
Last updated: 2 October 2024

=== Most ten-wicket hauls in a match ===
A ten-wicket haul refers to a bowler taking ten or more wickets in a match over two innings.

Rank	Ten-wicket hauls	Player	Innings	Balls	Wickets	Period
1	2	Mehedi Hasan Miraz†	82	11,356	182	2016–2024
1	2	Taijul Islam†	84	12,511	196	2007–2024
1	2	Shakib Al Hasan	121	15,675	246	2007–2024
4	1	Enamul Haque Jr	15	3,555	44	2003–2013
Last updated: 2 October 2024

=== Worst figures in an innings ===
Rank	Figures	Player	Overs	Opposition	Venue	Date
1	0/178	Mehedi Hasan Miraz†	56	South Africa	Senwes Park, Potchefstroom, South Africa	28 September 2017
2	0/171	Mehedi Hasan Miraz†	39	South Africa	Zohur Ahmed Chowdhury Stadium, Chittagong, Bangladesh	29 October 2024
3	0/149	Khaled Ahmed†	30	New Zealand	Seddon Park, Hamilton, New Zealand	28 February 2019
4	0/145	Taijul Islam†	27	South Africa	Mangaung Oval, Bloemfontein, South Africa	6 October 2017
5	0/143	Shahadat Hossain	33	Australia	M. A. Aziz Stadium, Chittagong, Bangladesh	16 April 2006
Last updated: 17 March 2026

=== Worst figures in a match ===
Rank	Figures	Player	Overs	Opposition	Venue	Date
1	0/247	Mehedi Hasan Miraz†	67	South Africa	Senwes Park, Potchefstroom, South Africa	28 September 2017
2	0/171	Mehedi Hasan Miraz†	39	South Africa	Zohur Ahmed Chowdhury Stadium, Chittagong, Bangladesh	29 October 2024
3	0/168	Shahadat Hossain	35	New Zealand	Seddon Park, Hamilton, New Zealand	15 February 2010
4	0/165	Elias Sunny	40	Sri Lanka	Galle International Stadium, Galle, Bangladesh	8 March 2013
5	0/150	Ebadot Hossain	33	South Africa	St George's Park, Gqeberha, South Africa	8 April 2022
Last updated: 17 March 2026

=== Most wickets in a series ===
Rank	Wickets	Player1	Matches	Series
1	19	Mehedi Hasan Miraz†	2	England in Bangladesh in 2016
2	18	Enamul Haque Jr	2	Zimbabwe in Bangladesh in 2004
2	18	Shakib Al Hasan	3	Zimbabwe in Bangladesh in 2014
2	18	Taijul Islam†	2	Zimbabwe in Bangladesh in 2018
5	17	Taijul Islam†	3	Zimbabwe in Bangladesh in 2014
5	17	Mohammad Rafique	3	Bangladesh in Pakistan in 2003
Last updated: 20 June 2020

=== Hat-trick ===
In cricket, a hat-trick occurs when a bowler takes three wickets with consecutive deliveries. The deliveries may be interrupted by an over bowled by another bowler from the other end of the pitch or the other team's innings, but must be three consecutive deliveries by the individual bowler in the same match. Only wickets attributed to the bowler count towards a hat-trick; run outs do not count. In Test cricket history there have been just 44 hat-tricks, the first achieved by Fred Spofforth for Australia against England in 1879. In 1912, Australian Jimmy Matthews achieved the feat twice in one game against South Africa. The only other players to achieve two hat-tricks are Australia's Hugh Trumble, against England in 1902 and 1904, Pakistan's Wasim Akram, in separate games against Sri Lanka in 1999, and England's Stuart Broad.

No.	Bowler	For	Against	Inn.	Test	Dismissals	Venue	Date	Ref.
1	Alok Kapali	Bangladesh	Pakistan	1	2/3	Shabbir Ahmed (c Mashrafe Mortaza); Danish Kaneria (lbw); Umar Gul (lbw)	(Pakistan) Arbab Niaz Stadium, Peshawar	29 August 2003	
2	Sohag Gazi	Bangladesh	New Zealand	2	1/2	Corey Anderson (lbw); BJ Watling (c Mushfiqur Rahim); Doug Bracewell (c Shakib Al Hasan)	(Bangladesh) Zahur Ahmed Chowdhury Stadium, Chittagong	13 October 2013	

== Wicket-keeping records ==
The wicket-keeper is a specialist fielder who stands behind the stumps being guarded by the batsman on strike and is the only member of the fielding side allowed to wear gloves and leg pads.

=== Most career dismissals ===
A wicket-keeper can be credited with the dismissal of a batsman in two ways, caught or stumped. A fair catch is taken when the ball is caught fully within the field of play without it bouncing after the ball has touched the striker's bat or glove holding the bat, while a stumping occurs when the wicket-keeper puts down the wicket while the batsman is out of his ground and not attempting a run.

Rank	Dismissals	Player	Matches	Period
1	126	Litton Das†	53	2015–2026
2	113	Mushfiqur Rahim†	98	2005–2026
3	87	Khaled Mashud	44	2000–2007
4	34	Nurul Hasan†	11	2017–2023
5	9	Jaker Ali†	6	2024–2025
Last updated: 27 June 2025

=== Most career catches ===
Rank	Catches	Player	Matches	Period
1	111	Litton Das†	53	2015–2026
2	98	Mushfiqur Rahim†	98	2005–2026
3	78	Khaled Mashud	44	2000–2007
4	25	Nurul Hasan†	11	2017–2023
5	8	Jaker Ali†	6	2024–2025
Last updated: 27 June 2025

=== Most career stumpings ===
Rank	Stumpings	Player	Matches	Period
1	15	Mushfiqur Rahim†	98	2005–2025
2	15	Litton Das†	50	2015–2025
3	9	Khaled Mashud	44	2000–2007
4	7	Nurul Hasan†	11	2017–2023
5	1	Mahmudullah	50	2009–2021
5	1	Shahriar Hossain	3	2000–2004
5	1	Mohammad Salim	2	2003–2003
5	1	Jaker Ali†	6	2024–2025
Last updated: 17 June 2023

=== Most dismissals in an innings ===
Rank	Dismissals	Player	Opposition	Venue	Date
1	5	Mushfiqur Rahim†	India	Sher-e-Bangla National Cricket Stadium, Mirpur, Bangladesh	24 January 2010
1	5	Mushfiqur Rahim†	Sri Lanka	Premadasa Stadium, Colombo, Sri Lanka	16 March 2013
1	5	Imrul Kayes	New Zealand	Basin Reserve, Wellington, New Zealand	12 January 2017
4	4	Khaled Mashud	Sri Lanka	Sinhalese Sports Ground, Colombo, Sri Lanka	28 July 2002
4	4	Khaled Mashud	West Indies	M. A. Aziz Stadium, Chittagong, Bangladesh	16 December 2002
4	4	Khaled Mashud	Zimbabwe	Harare Sports Club, Harare, Zimbabwe	19 February 2004
4	4	Khaled Mashud	India	M. A. Aziz Stadium, Chittagong, Bangladesh	17 December 2004
4	4	Khaled Mashud	Sri Lanka	Premadasa Stadium, Colombo, Sri Lanka	12 September 2005
4	4	Mushfiqur Rahim†	Pakistan	Sher-e-Bangla National Cricket Stadium, Mirpur, Bangladesh	17 December 2011
4	4	Mushfiqur Rahim†	Zimbabwe	Harare Sports Club, Harare, Zimbabwe	25 April 2013
4	4	Mushfiqur Rahim†	Sri Lanka	P. Sara Oval, Colombo, Sri Lanka	15 March 2017
4	4	Litton Das†	South Africa	Senwes Park, Potchefstroom, South Africa	28 September 2017
4	4	Litton Das†	Sri Lanka	Pallekele International Cricket Stadium, Kandy, Sri Lanka	29 April 2021
4	4	Litton Das†	Ireland	Sher-e-Bangla National Cricket Stadium, Mirpur, Bangladesh	4 April 2023
Last updated: 7 April 2023

=== Most dismissals in a match ===
Rank	Dismissals	Player	Opposition	Venue	Date
1	7	Khaled Mashud	Zimbabwe	Harare Sports Club, Harare, Zimbabwe	19 February 2004
2	6	Nurul Hasan	India	Sher-e-Bangla National Cricket Stadium, Mirpur, Bangladesh	22 December 2022
2	6	Litton Das†	Afghanistan	Sher-e-Bangla National Cricket Stadium, Mirpur, Bangladesh	14 June 2023
2	6	Litton Das†	Sri Lanka	Sylhet International Cricket Stadium, Sylhet, Bangladesh	22 March 2024
2	6	Litton Das†	Pakistan	Rawalpindi Cricket Stadium, Rawalpindi, Pakistan	21 August 2024
2	6	Litton Das†	Pakistan	Rawalpindi Cricket Stadium, Rawalpindi, Pakistan	30 August 2024
Last updated: 17 March 2026

=== Most dismissals in a series ===
Rank	Dismissals	Player	Matches	Innings	Series
1	11	Mushfiqur Rahim†	3	11	Zimbabwe in Bangladesh in 2014
2	8	Khaled Mashud	2	3	Bangladesh in Zimbabwe in 2004
2	8	Khaled Mashud	2	4	England in Bangladesh in 2003
2	8	Mushfiqur Rahim†	2	4	India in Bangladesh in 2010
2	8	Nurul Hasan	2	4	Bangladesh in West Indies in 2022
Last updated: 17 June 2023

== Fielding records ==
=== Most career catches ===
Rank	Catches	Player	Innings	Period
1	42	Mominul Haque†	113	2013-2026
2	41	Mehidy Hasan Miraz†	88	2016–2026
3	38	Mahmudullah	87	2009–2021
4	30	Imrul Kayes	67	2008–2019
5	29	Shakib Al Hasan	126	2007-2024
Last updated: 2 October 2024

=== Most catches in a match ===
Rank	Catches	Player	Opponent	Venue	Date
1	5	Soumya Sarkar	Sri Lanka	P. Sara Oval, Colombo, Sri Lanka	15 March 2017
1	5	Shadman Islam †	New Zealand	Bay Oval, Mount Maunganui, New Zealand	1 January 2022
2	4	Five players have taken four catches in a match on six occasions.			
Last updated: 5 January 2022

=== Most catches in a series ===
Rank	Catches	Player	Matches	Innings	Series
1	6	Mominul Haque †	3	6	Zimbabwe in Bangladesh in 2014
1	6	Mahmudullah	3	6	Zimbabwe in Bangladesh in 2014
1	6	Soumya Sarkar	2	4	Australian cricket team in Bangladesh in 2017
4	5	Soumya Sarkar	2	4	Bangladesh in Sri Lanka in 2017
4	5	Shadman Islam†	2	3	Bangladesh in New Zealand in 2022
Last updated: 11 January 2022

== All-round records ==
=== 1000 runs and 100 wickets ===
A total of 71 players have achieved the double of 1000 runs and 100 wickets in their Test career.

Rank	Player	Average Difference	Matches	Runs	Bat Avg	Wickets	Bowl Avg	Period
1	Shakib Al Hasan	6.05	71	4,609	37.77	246	31.72	2007–2024
2	Mehidy Hasan Miraz†	-10.04	47	1,689	22.52	183	32.56	2016-2024
3	Mohammad Rafique	-22.18	33	1,059	18.57	100	40.76	2000–2008
Last updated: 2 October 2024

== Other records ==
=== Most career matches ===
Rank	Matches	Player	Runs	Wkts	Period
1	103	Mushfiqur Rahim†	6,799	-	2005–2026
2	78	Mominul Haque†	5,117	11	2013–2026
3	71	Shakib Al Hasan	4,609	246	2007–2024
4	70	Tamim Iqbal†	5,134	-	2008–2023
5	61	Mohammad Ashraful	2,737	21	2001–2013
Last updated: 17 March 2026

=== Most matches as captain ===
Rank	Matches	Player	Won	Lost	Tied	Draw	%W	%L	Period
1	34	Mushfiqur Rahim†	7	18	0	9	20.58	52.94	2011–2017
2	19	Shakib Al Hasan	4	15	0	0	21.05	78.94	2009–2023
3	19	Najmul Hossain Shanto†	9	9	0	1	37.50	56.25	2023–2026
4	18	Habibul Bashar	1	13	0	4	5.55	72.22	2004–2007
5	17	Mominul Haque†	3	12	0	2	17.64	70.58	2019–2022
Last updated: 17 March 2026

=== Most man of the match awards ===
Rank	M.O.M. Awards	Player	Matches	Period
1	7	Mushfiqur Rahim†	92	2005–2024
2	6	Shakib Al Hasan	71	2007–2024
3	4	Mominul Haque†	65	2013–2024
4	3	Mohammad Ashraful	61	2001–2013
4	3	Tamim Iqbal†	70	2008–2023
Last updated: 2 October 2024

=== Most man of the series awards ===
Rank	M.O.S. Awards	Player	Matches	Period
1	5	Shakib Al Hasan	71	2007–2024
2	2	Mehidy Hasan Miraz†	48	2016–2024
2	2	Taijul Islam†	48	2014–2024
4	1	Robiul Islam	9	2010–2014
4	1	Enamul Haque Jr.	15	2003–2013
4	1	Javed Omar	40	2001–2007
4	1	Mominul Haque†	66	2013–2024
4	1	Tamim Iqbal†	70	2008–2023
Last updated: 2 October 2024

=== Youngest players ===
Rank	Age	Player	Opposition	Venue	Date
1	15 years and 128 days	Mohammad Sharif	Zimbabwe	Queens Sports Club, Bulawayo, Zimbabwe	19 April 2001
2	16 years and 223 days	Talha Jubair	Sri Lanka	P. Sara Oval, Colombo, Sri Lanka	21 July 2002
3	16 years and 320 days	Enamul Haque Jr	England	Bangabandhu National Stadium, Dhaka, Bangladesh	21 October 2003
4	17 years and 61 days	Mohammad Ashraful	Sri Lanka	Sinhalese Sports Club, Colombo, Sri Lanka	6 September 2001
5	17 years and 73 days	Mohammad Nazmul Hossain	India	MA Aziz Stadium, Chittagong, Bangladesh	17 December 2004
Last updated: 28 January 2021

=== Oldest players on debut ===
Rank	Age	Player	Opposition	Venue	Date
1	35 years and 58 days	Enamul Haque	Zimbabwe	Harare Sports Club, Harae, Zimbabwe	26 April 2001
2	32 years and 282 days	Aminul Islam	India	Bangabandhu National Stadium, Dhaka, Bangladesh	10 November 2000
3	32 years and 9 days	Akram Khan	India	Bangabandhu National Stadium, Dhaka, Bangladesh	10 November 2000
4	30 years and 286 days	Sanwar Hossain	New Zealand	Seddon Park, Hamilton, New Zealand	18 December 2001
5	30 years and 105 days	Khaled Mahmud	Zimbabwe	Bangabandhu National Stadium, Dhaka, Bangladesh	8 November 2001
Last updated: 28 January 2021

=== Oldest players ===
Rank	Age	Player	Opposition	Venue	Date
1	37 years and 187 days	Shakib Al Hasan	India	Green Park, Kanpur, India	27 September 2024
2	37 years and 177 days	Mohammad Rafique	South Africa	Zahur Ahmed Chowdhury Stadium, Chittagong, Bangladesh	29 February 2008
3	37 years and 173 days	Mushfiqur Rahim†	South Africa	Zahur Ahmed Chowdhury Stadium, Chittagong, Bangladesh	29 October 2024
4	37 years and 56 days	Enamul Haque	South Africa	MA Aziz Stadium, Chittagong, Bangladesh	24 April 2003
5	35 years and 238 days	Abdur Razzak	Sri Lanka	Shere Bangla National Stadium, Mirpur, Bangladesh	8 February 2018
Last updated: 29 October 2024

== Umpiring records ==
=== Most matches umpired ===
An umpire in cricket is a person who officiates the match according to the Laws of Cricket. Two umpires adjudicate the match on the field, whilst a third umpire has access to video replays, and a fourth umpire looks after the match balls and other duties. The records below are only for on-field umpires.

Aleem Dar of Pakistan holds the record for the most Test matches umpired with 132, as of December 2020. The current active Dar set the record in December 2019 overtaking Steve Bucknor from the West Indies mark of 128 matches. They are followed by South Africa's Rudi Koertzen who officiated in 108. The most experienced Bangladeshi is Sharfuddoula.

Rank	Matches	Umpire	Period
1	9	Sharfuddoula	2021–2023
2	2	A. F. M. Akhtaruddin	2001–2002
2	1	Showkatur Rahman	2001–2001
2	1	Mahbubur Rahman	2002–2002
2	1	Enamul Haque	2012–2012
Last updated: 8 December 2021

== See also ==
- List of Bangladesh One Day International cricket records
- List of Bangladesh Twenty20 International cricket records
