= Bangladeshi cricket team in Pakistan in 2024 =

International cricket tour

	Pakistan	Bangladesh
- Dates: 21 August – 3 September 2024
Captains	Shan Masood	Najmul Hossain Shanto

Test series
- Result: Bangladesh won the 2-match series 2–0
Most runs	Mohammad Rizwan (294)	Mushfiqur Rahim (216)
Most wickets	Khurram Shahzad (9)	Mehidy Hasan Miraz (10)
- Player of the series: Mehidy Hasan Miraz (Ban)

The Bangladesh cricket team toured Pakistan in August and September 2024 to play two Test matches. The Test series formed part of the 2023–2025 ICC World Test Championship. The Pakistan Cricket Board (PCB) finalized the bilateral series as a part of the 2023–2027 ICC Future Tours Programme. In July 2024, the Pakistan Cricket Board (PCB) confirmed the fixtures for the tour, as a part of the 2024–25 home international season.

On 18 August 2024, PCB moved the second Test match from National Stadium, Karachi to Rawalpindi Cricket Stadium due to construction work.

== Squads ==
Pakistan	Bangladesh
Shan Masood (c); Saud Shakeel (vc); Shaheen Afridi; Abrar Ahmed; Sarfaraz Ahmed (wk); Mohammad Ali; Salman Ali Agha; Saim Ayub; Babar Azam; Kamran Ghulam; Mir Hamza; Mohammad Huraira; Aamir Jamal; Mohammad Rizwan (wk); Abdullah Shafique; Naseem Shah; Khurram Shahzad	Najmul Hossain Shanto (c); Khaled Ahmed; Taskin Ahmed; Shakib Al Hasan; Liton Das (wk); Mominul Haque; ~~Mahmudul Hasan Joy~~; Mehidy Hasan Miraz; Nayeem Hasan; Zakir Hasan (wk); Shadman Islam; Shoriful Islam; Taijul Islam; Hasan Mahmud; Mushfiqur Rahim (wk); Nahid Rana

On 17 August 2024, Mahmudul Hasan Joy was ruled out of the series with a groin injury. On 19 August 2024, Aamir Jamal was ruled out of the series due to back injury. On 28 August 2024, Abrar Ahmed, Aamir Jamal who was initially released due to injury and Kamran Ghulam were added to the squad for the second Test.

== Test series ==
=== 1st Test ===
21–25 August 2024
Scorecard

Pakistan	v	Bangladesh
448/6d (113 overs); Mohammad Rizwan 171* (241); Hasan Mahmud 2/70 (23 overs)		565 (167.3 overs); Mushfiqur Rahim 191 (341); Naseem Shah 3/93 (27.3 overs)
146 (55.5 overs); Mohammad Rizwan 51 (80); Mehidy Hasan Miraz 4/21 (11.5 overs)		30/0 (6.3 overs); Zakir Hasan 15* (26)

Bangladesh won by 10 wickets
Rawalpindi Cricket Stadium, Rawalpindi
Umpires: Adrian Holdstock (SA) and Richard Kettleborough (Eng)
Player of the match: Mushfiqur Rahim (Ban)

- Bangladesh won the toss and elected to field.
- The start of day 1 was delayed by 4 hours and 30 minutes due to a wet outfield.
- Saud Shakeel (Pak) scored his 1,000th run in Tests.
- This was Pakistan's lowest total against Bangladesh (2nd Innings).
- This was Bangladesh's first win against Pakistan in Tests.
- World Test Championship points: Bangladesh 9, Pakistan –6.

=== 2nd Test ===
30 August–3 September 2024
Scorecard

Pakistan	v	Bangladesh
274 (85.1 overs); Saim Ayub 58 (110); Mehidy Hasan Miraz 5/61 (22.1 overs)		262 (78.4 overs); Liton Das 138 (228); Khurram Shahzad 6/90 (21 overs)
172 (46.4 overs); Salman Ali Agha 47* (71); Hasan Mahmud 5/43 (10.4 overs)		185/4 (56 overs); Zakir Hasan 40 (39); Salman Ali Agha 1/17 (4 overs)

Bangladesh won by 6 wickets
Rawalpindi Cricket Stadium, Rawalpindi
Umpires: Michael Gough (Eng) and Richard Kettleborough (Eng)
Player of the match: Liton Das (Ban)

- Bangladesh won the toss and elected to field.
- No play was possible on day 1 due to rain.
- Khurram Shahzad (Pak) took his first five-wicket haul in Tests.
- Hasan Mahmud (Ban) took his first five-wicket haul in Tests.
- For the first time, Bangladeshi pacers took all 10 wickets of an innings in a Test, in Pakistan's 2nd batting innings.
- This was Bangladesh's first test series win in Pakistani soil.
- The 165 run partnership between Liton Das and Mehidy Hasan Miraz is the highest 7th wicket partnership after the loss of 6 wickets for less than 30 runs and the highest 7th wicket partnership for Bangladesh.
- World Test Championship points: Bangladesh 12, Pakistan 0.
