= West Indian cricket team in Bangladesh in 2018–19 =

International cricket tour

	Bangladesh	West Indies
- Dates: 18 November – 22 December 2018
Captains	Shakib Al Hasan (Tests & T20Is); Mashrafe Mortaza (ODIs)	Kraigg Brathwaite (Tests); Rovman Powell (ODIs); Carlos Brathwaite (T20Is)

Test series
- Result: Bangladesh won the 2-match series 2–0
Most runs	Mahmudullah (170)	Shimron Hetmyer (222)
Most wickets	Mehedi Hasan (15)	Jomel Warrican (8)
- Player of the series: Shakib Al Hasan (Ban)

One Day International series
- Results: Bangladesh won the 3-match series 2–1
Most runs	Tamim Iqbal (143)	Shai Hope (297)
Most wickets	Mehedi Hasan (6); Mashrafe Mortaza (6)	Oshane Thomas (4); Keemo Paul (4)
- Player of the series: Shai Hope (WI)

Twenty20 International series
- Results: West Indies won the 3-match series 2–1
Most runs	Litton Das (109)	Shai Hope (114)
Most wickets	Shakib Al Hasan (8)	Keemo Paul (7); Sheldon Cottrell (7)
- Player of the series: Shakib Al Hasan (Ban)

The West Indies cricket team toured Bangladesh in November and December 2018 to play two Tests, three One Day Internationals (ODIs) and three Twenty20 International (T20I) matches. It was the West Indies first full tour of Bangladesh since December 2012. The fixtures were confirmed in July 2018, with the Sylhet International Cricket Stadium scheduled to host its first ODI match. The third ODI of the series, played on 14 December 2018, became the inaugural ODI match at Sylhet Stadium.

Ahead of the series, the West Indies' captain Jason Holder was ruled out of the tour with a shoulder injury. Kraigg Brathwaite replaced Holder as the captain of the Test side, and Rovman Powell captained the ODI side.

Bangladesh won the first Test by 64 runs to record their first home victory against the West Indies. Bangladesh won the second Test by an innings and 184 runs, their biggest winning margin in Tests, to take the series 2–0. It was Bangladesh's first series win against the West Indies. Bangladesh's spinners took all 40 wickets, becoming the first team to take all 40 wickets in a two-match Test series by spin. Bangladesh won the ODI series 2–1. The West Indies won the T20I series 2–1.

== Squads ==
Tests		ODIs		T20Is	
Bangladesh	West Indies	Bangladesh	West Indies	Bangladesh	West Indies
Shakib Al Hasan (c); Khaled Ahmed; Litton Das; Ariful Haque; Mominul Haque; Mehedi Hasan; Nayeem Hasan; Shadman Islam; Taijul Islam; Imrul Kayes; Mahmudullah; Mohammad Mithun; Mushfiqur Rahim; Mustafizur Rahman; Soumya Sarkar	Kraigg Brathwaite (c); Sunil Ambris; Devendra Bishoo; Roston Chase; Shane Dowrich; Shannon Gabriel; Jahmar Hamilton; Shimron Hetmyer; Shai Hope; Shermon Lewis; Keemo Paul; Kieran Powell; Raymon Reifer; Kemar Roach; Jomel Warrican	Mashrafe Mortaza (c); Litton Das; Ariful Haque; Mehedi Hasan; Shakib Al Hasan; Abu Hider; Rubel Hossain; Tamim Iqbal; Nazmul Islam; Imrul Kayes; Mahmudullah; Mohammad Mithun; Mushfiqur Rahim; Mustafizur Rahman; Mohammad Saifuddin; Soumya Sarkar	Rovman Powell (c); Fabian Allen; Sunil Ambris; Devendra Bishoo; Carlos Brathwaite; Darren Bravo; Roston Chase; Chandrapaul Hemraj; Shimron Hetmyer; Shai Hope; Keemo Paul; Kieran Powell; Kemar Roach; Marlon Samuels; Oshane Thomas	Shakib Al Hasan (c); Litton Das; Ariful Haque; Mehedi Hasan; Abu Hider; Rubel Hossain; Tamim Iqbal; Nazmul Islam; Mahmudullah; Mohammad Mithun; Mushfiqur Rahim; Mustafizur Rahman; Mohammad Saifuddin; Soumya Sarkar	Carlos Brathwaite (c); Fabian Allen; Darren Bravo; Sheldon Cottrell; Shimron Hetmyer; Shai Hope; Evin Lewis; Keemo Paul; Khary Pierre; Nicholas Pooran; Rovman Powell; Denesh Ramdin; Sherfane Rutherford; Oshane Thomas; Kesrick Williams

Two days after Bangladesh's Test squad was named, Shadman Islam was added to the team. Imrul Kayes was ruled out of Bangladesh's squad for the second Test with a shoulder injury. Litton Das was called up to Bangladesh's squad for the second Test as cover for Mushfiqur Rahim.

== Tour matches ==
=== Two-day match: BCB XI vs West Indians ===
18–19 November 2018
Scorecard

West Indians	v	Bangladesh Cricket Board XI
303/7d (86.3 overs); Shai Hope 88 (112); Nayeem Hasan 2/104 (26 overs)		232/5 (75 overs); Soumya Sarkar 78 (103); Shannon Gabriel 2/24 (8 overs)

Match drawn
M. A. Aziz Stadium, Chittagong
Umpires: Masudur Rahman (Ban) and Gazi Sohel (Ban)

- West Indies won the toss and elected to bat.

=== 50 over match: BCB XI vs West Indians ===
6 December 2018
09:00
Scorecard

West Indians; 331/8 (50 overs)	v	Bangladesh Cricket Board XI; 314/6 (41 overs)
Shai Hope 81 (84); Rubel Hossain 2/55 (10 overs)		Tamim Iqbal 107 (73); Roston Chase 2/57 (10 overs)

BCB XI won by 51 runs (D/L method)
Bangladesh Krira Shikkha Protisthan No 3 Ground, Savar
Umpires: Masudur Rahman (Ban) and Sharfuddoula (Ban)

- West Indies won the toss and elected to bat.

== Venues ==
Chattogram	Dhaka	Sylhet
Zohur Ahmed Chowdhury Stadium	Sher-e-Bangla National Cricket Stadium	Sylhet International Cricket Stadium
Capacity: 20,000	Capacity: 26,000	Capacity: 18,500
West Indian cricket team in Bangladesh in 2018–19 is located in Bangladesh

== Test series ==
=== 1st Test ===
22–26 November 2018 (Note: While five days of play were scheduled for each Test, each Test reached a result in three days.)
Scorecard

Bangladesh	v	West Indies
324 (92.4 overs); Mominul Haque 120 (167); Jomel Warrican 4/62 (21.4 overs)		246 (64 overs); Shimron Hetmyer 63 (47); Nayeem Hasan 5/61 (14 overs)
125 (35.5 overs); Mahmudullah 31 (46); Devendra Bishoo 4/26 (9 overs)		139 (35.2 overs); Sunil Ambris 43 (62); Taijul Islam 6/33 (11.2 overs)

Bangladesh won by 64 runs
Zohur Ahmed Chowdhury Stadium, Chittagong
Umpires: Aleem Dar (Pak) and Richard Illingworth (Eng)
Player of the match: Mominul Haque (Ban)

- Bangladesh won the toss and elected to bat.
- Nayeem Hasan (Ban) made his Test debut.
- Nayeem Hasan became the eighth bowler for Bangladesh to take a five-wicket haul on debut in Tests.
- Nayeem Hasan was also the youngest bowler to take a five-wicket haul on debut in Tests, at the age of 17 years and 356 days.
- Shakib Al Hasan became the first bowler for Bangladesh to take 200 wickets in Tests.
- Shakib Al Hasan also became the fastest cricketer, in terms of matches, to score 3,000 runs and take 200 wickets in Tests (54).
- This was Bangladesh's first home win against the West Indies in Tests.

=== 2nd Test ===
30 November–4 December 2018
Scorecard

Bangladesh	v	West Indies
508 (154 overs); Mahmudullah 136 (242); Kraigg Brathwaite 2/57 (15 overs)		111 (36.4 overs); Shimron Hetmyer 39 (53); Mehedi Hasan 7/58 (16 overs)
		213 (59.2 overs) (f/o); Shimron Hetmyer 93 (92); Mehedi Hasan 5/59 (20 overs)

Bangladesh won by an innings and 184 runs
Sher-e-Bangla National Cricket Stadium, Dhaka
Umpires: Aleem Dar (Pak) and Ruchira Palliyaguruge (SL)
Player of the match: Mehedi Hasan (Ban)

- Bangladesh won the toss and elected to bat.
- Shadman Islam (Ban) made his Test debut.
- Kemar Roach (WI) played in his 50th Test.
- Mushfiqur Rahim became the second batsman for Bangladesh to score 4,000 runs in Tests.
- Bangladesh enforced the follow-on for the first time in Tests.
- Mehedi Hasan took the best match figures by a Bangladesh bowler in Tests (12/117).
- This was Bangladesh's biggest winning margin by runs, and their first win by an innings in Tests.

== ODI series ==
=== 1st ODI ===
9 December 2018
13:00 (D/N)
Scorecard

West Indies; 195/9 (50 overs)	v	Bangladesh; 196/5 (35.1 overs)
Shai Hope 43 (59); Mashrafe Mortaza 3/30 (10 overs)		Mushfiqur Rahim 55* (70); Roston Chase 2/47 (9 overs)

Bangladesh won by 5 wickets
Sher-e-Bangla National Cricket Stadium, Dhaka
Umpires: Ruchira Palliyaguruge (SL) and Sharfuddoula (Ban)
Player of the match: Mashrafe Mortaza (Ban)

- West Indies won the toss and elected to bat.
- Rovman Powell captained the West Indies for the first time in ODIs.
- Mashrafe Mortaza (Ban) played his 200th ODI, which includes two matches for the Asia XI team.

=== 2nd ODI ===
11 December 2018
13:00 (D/N)
Scorecard

Bangladesh; 255/7 (50 overs)	v	West Indies; 256/6 (49.4 overs)
Shakib Al Hasan 65 (62); Oshane Thomas 3/54 (10 overs)		Shai Hope 146* (144); Rubel Hossain 2/57 (9 overs)

West Indies won by 4 wickets
Sher-e-Bangla National Cricket Stadium, Dhaka
Umpires: Aleem Dar (Pak) and Masudur Rahman (Ban)
Player of the match: Shai Hope (WI)

- West Indies won the toss and elected to field.

=== 3rd ODI ===
14 December 2018
12:00 (D/N)
Scorecard

West Indies; 198/9 (50 overs)	v	Bangladesh; 202/2 (38.3 overs)
Shai Hope 108* (131); Mehedi Hasan 4/29 (10 overs)		Tamim Iqbal 81* (104); Keemo Paul 2/38 (7 overs)

Bangladesh won by 8 wickets
Sylhet International Cricket Stadium, Sylhet
Umpires: Ruchira Palliyaguruge (SL) and Masudur Rahman (Ban)
Player of the match: Mehedi Hasan (Ban)

- Bangladesh won the toss and elected to field.
- This was the first ODI to be played at this venue.
- Mashrafe Mortaza became the first cricketer to play 200 ODIs for Bangladesh.
- Mashrafe Mortaza set the record of captaining Bangladesh in most number of ODIs (70).

== T20I series ==
=== 1st T20I ===
17 December 2018
12:30
Scorecard

Bangladesh; 129 (19 overs)	v	West Indies; 130/2 (10.5 overs)
Shakib Al Hasan 61 (43); Sheldon Cottrell 4/28 (4 overs)		Shai Hope 55 (23); Mohammad Saifuddin 1/13 (1 over)

West Indies won by 8 wickets
Sylhet International Cricket Stadium, Sylhet
Umpires: Tanvir Ahmed (Ban) and Sharfuddoula (Ban)
Player of the match: Sheldon Cottrell (WI)

- Bangladesh won the toss and elected to bat.

=== 2nd T20I ===
20 December 2018
17:00 (D/N)
Scorecard

Bangladesh; 211/4 (20 overs)	v	West Indies; 175 (19.2 overs)
Litton Das 60 (34); Sheldon Cottrell 2/38 (4 overs)		Rovman Powell 50 (34); Shakib Al Hasan 5/20 (4 overs)

Bangladesh won by 36 runs
Sher-e-Bangla National Cricket Stadium, Dhaka
Umpires: Tanvir Ahmed (Ban) and Gazi Sohel (Ban)
Player of the match: Shakib Al Hasan (Ban)

- West Indies won the toss and elected to field.
- Shakib Al Hasan (Ban) took his first five-wicket haul in T20Is.

=== 3rd T20I ===
22 December 2018
17:00 (D/N)
Scorecard

West Indies; 190 (19.2 overs)	v	Bangladesh; 140 (17 overs)
Evin Lewis 89 (36); Mahmudullah 3/18 (3.2 overs)		Litton Das 43 (25); Keemo Paul 5/15 (4 overs)

West Indies won by 50 runs
Sher-e-Bangla National Cricket Stadium, Dhaka
Umpires: Tanvir Ahmed (Ban) and Masudur Rahman (Ban)
Player of the match: Evin Lewis (WI)

- Bangladesh won the toss and elected to field.
- Sherfane Rutherford (WI) made his T20I debut.
- Keemo Paul (WI) took his first five-wicket haul in T20Is.
