= Litton Das =

Bangladeshi cricketer (born 1994)

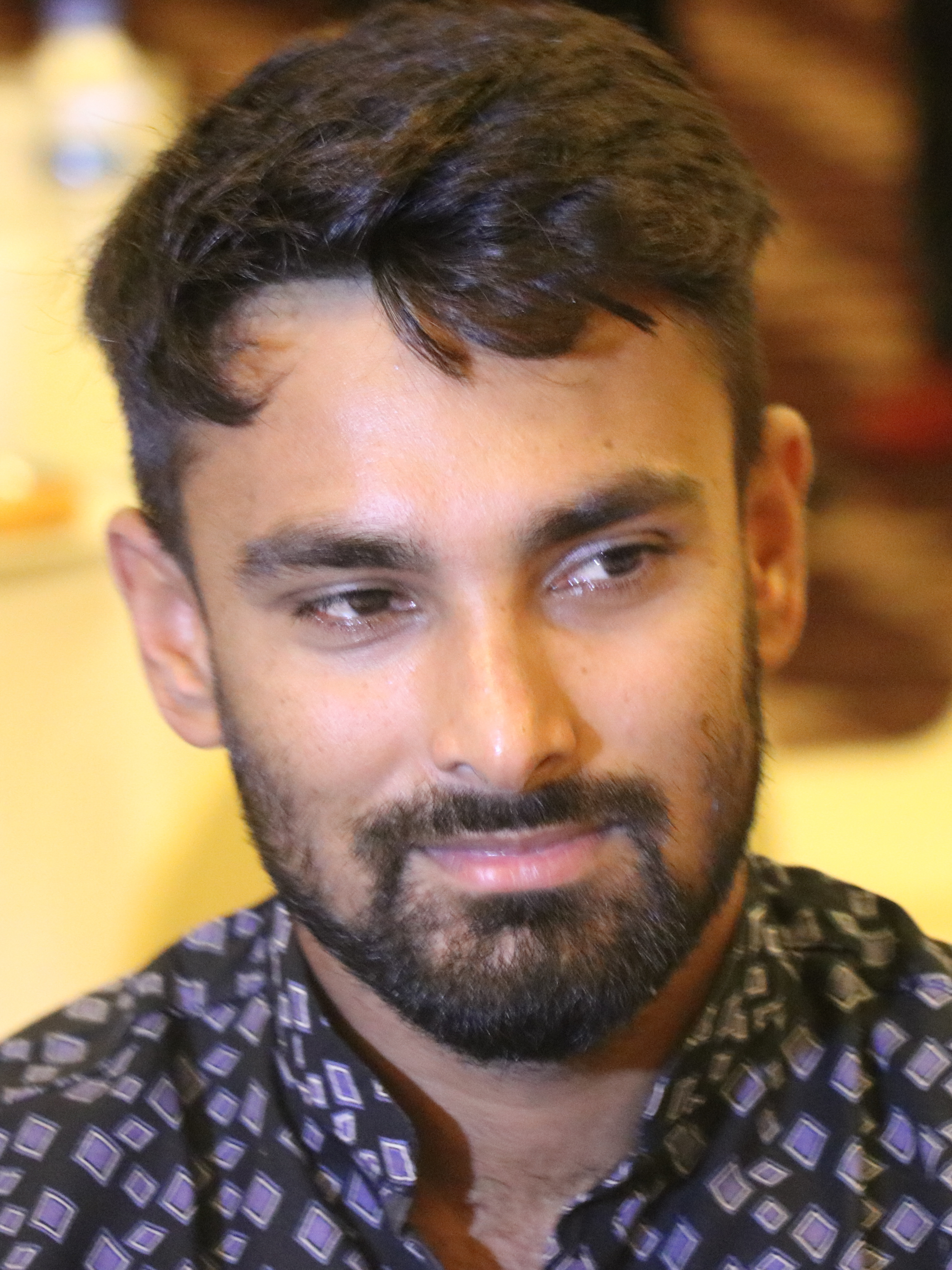
- Das in 2018

Personal information
- Full name: Litton Kumer Das
- Born: 13 October 1994 (age 32); Dinajpur, Bangladesh
- Batting: Right-handed
- Bowling: Right-arm off break
- Role: Wicket-keeper batter

International information
- National side: Bangladesh (2015–present)
- Test debut (cap 77): 10 June 2015 v India
- Last Test: 15 November 2026 v South Africa
- ODI debut (cap 117): 18 June 2015 v India
- Last ODI: 14 June 2026 v Australia
- ODI shirt no.: 16
- T20I debut (cap 46): 5 July 2015 v South Africa
- Last T20I: 3 October 2026 v Sri Lanka
- T20I shirt no.: 16

Domestic team information
- Years: Team
- 2012–present: North Zone
- 2013: Dhaka Gladiators
- 2011–present: Rangpur Division
- 2015–17, 2022, 2024: Comilla Victorians
- 2018–19: Sylhet Sixers
- 2019: Jamaica Tallawahs
- 2019–20: Rajshahi Royals
- 2023: Kolkata Knight Riders
- 2023: Galle Titans
- 2025: Karachi Kings
- 2024/25: Dhaka Capitals
- 2025/26: Rangpur Riders
- 2026-present: Galle Gallants

Career statistics
Competition	Test	ODI	T20I	FC
Matches	60	104	124	108
Runs scored	3,723	2,869	2,704	8,034
Batting average	36.86	30.84	23.11	45.90
100s/50s	8/21	5/14	0/16	23/39
Top score	141	176	83	274
Catches/stumpings	142/22	76/5	80/15	206/30
Medal record
Men's Cricket
Representing Bangladesh
ACC Asia Cup
Runner-up	2018 UAE
- Source: ESPNcricinfo, 19 November 2026

Litton Kumer Das (born 13 October 1994) is a Bangladeshi cricketer who plays for the national team as a right-handed batter and wicket-keeper. Making his international debut in 2015, he captains Bangladesh in the ODI and T20I formats. While wicket-keeping in Test matches, Das averages the highest for his country.

== Personal life ==
Das was born in Dinajpur district of Bangladesh on 13 October 1994. He has two brothers. He studied in Bangladesh Krira Shikkha Protishtan and played age-group cricket. On 28 July 2019, he married his long-time girlfriend Devashri Biswas Sonchita who is an agriculturist in Mirpur, Bangladesh. A daughter was born to them in November 2023.

== Domestic and Franchise T20 ==
=== Early life ===
Aged 13, Das represented the Bangladesh Under-15s in the 2007–08 season. He went on to play for Bangladesh Krira Shikkha Protisthan from 2009 to 2011. In 2010–11, he was selected for both the Under-17s and the Under-19s, playing for the latter in the Under-19 World Cups in 2012 and 2014. In 2013, while still a teenager, he played for the Bangladesh Under-23s.

=== National Cricket League & List-A Cricket ===
Playing for Rangpur Division in the 2014–15 National Cricket League, he scored five centuries and finished the seven-match season with 1,024 runs at an average of 85.33. Rangpur Division won the championship.

In January 2017, Das scored his maiden double-century in first-class cricket, playing for East Zone in the 2016–17 Bangladesh Cricket League. As a result of this, he was recalled to Bangladesh's Test squad for their one-off match against India in February 2017.

Das scored the most runs in the 2016–17 Dhaka Premier Division Cricket League, with 752 in 14 matches.

In April 2018, Das was the leading run-scorer in the 2017–18 Bangladesh Cricket League, with 779 runs in six matches, including scoring 274 runs in one innings.

=== Bangladesh Premiere League ===
In October 2018, Das was named in the squad for the Sylhet Sixers team, following the draft for the 2018–19 Bangladesh Premier League.

In November 2019, he was selected to play for the Rajshahi Royals in the 2019–20 Bangladesh Premier League, scoring 455 runs in the tournament.

Das played for Gazi Group Chattogram in the 2020-21 Bangabandhu T20 Cup.

Das played for Comilla Victorians in 2021-22 Bangladesh Premiere League. His 209 runs in 9 matches helped Comilla to win their 2nd BPL title.

Das played for Comilla Victorians in 2022-23 Bangladesh Premiere League. He scored 379 runs in 13 matches, helping Comilla to win their back to back BPL title.

In 2024 Bangladesh Premiere League, Das captained Comilla Victorians. In the final, his team lost to Fortune Barishal by 6 wickets.

On 12 January 2025, Das wasn't included in Bangladesh squad for 2025 ICC Champions Trophy. In the very same day, he scored his first T-20 century for Dhaka Capitals against Durbar Rajshahi in 2025 Bangladesh Premiere League. This is the 2nd fastest century by a Bangladeshi in the history of the BPL. This century is also 4th highest individual run in the history of BPL. He also formed 241 run partnership with Tanzid Hasan in 118 balls which is 2nd highest partnership in recognized T20 Cricket. Dhaka Capitals finished with 254runs, highest team total in the BPL history.

=== Caribbean Premiere League ===
He played for Jamaica Tallawahs in the 2019 Caribbean Premier League, making his first appearance in an overseas franchise league. He scored 44 runs in two matches in the tournament.

=== Indian Premier League (IPL) ===
In March 2023, Das was bought by the Kolkata Knight Riders for ₹50 lakh (US$53,000), for the 2023 Indian Premier League season. He played only one match in that season scoring 4 runs.

== International career ==
=== 2015-2019 ===
Das made his Test debut against India on 10 June 2015. He made his One Day International debut, also against India, on 18 June 2015. He made his Twenty20 International debut against South Africa on 5 July 2015.

On 2 March 2017, Bangladesh's captain Mushfiqur Rahim was asked to play as a batsman only, with Das becoming the wicket-keeper for the Test series against Sri Lanka.

In June 2018, in the first test against West Indies, Bangladesh recorded their lowest team total in Tests with Das only managing to enter double figures among other batters- a mere 25 off 53 balls in a losing cause making a record. In the third t20 match against West Indies of the tour, he reached his first white-ball half-century off 24 balls, and his first 50-plus score in 17 innings scoring 61 runs eventually sealing the T20I series 2-1 and also ended up winning the Player of the match award.

On 28 September 2018, against India in the final of the 2018 Asia Cup, Das scored his maiden ODI century and went on to make 121(117) with 12 boundaries and 2 sixes. He would eventually win "Man of the Match" for his effort, despite Bangladesh losing the match off the final ball.

In April 2019, Das was named in Bangladesh's squad for the 2019 Cricket World Cup. He made his World Cup debut against the West Indies where he scored an unbeaten 94 runs and made an unbeaten 189-run partnership with Shakib Al Hasan which helped Bangladesh to a famous 7 wicket victory.

=== 2020–2022 ===
In March 2020, when Zimbabwe toured Bangladesh, in the first ODI, Das scored 126 runs, his second century in ODI and became the first Bangladeshi batsman to score a century at Sylhet. In the 3rd ODI, he scored his 1000th run in ODIs and then along with Tamim Iqbal made the highest partnership for Bangladesh for any wicket in ODIs (292 runs) as well as scoring 176 runs off 143 balls. He made the highest individual score by any Bangladeshi batsman in ODIs. Das scored 311 runs at an average of 103.68 in the ODI series and eventually become the "Player of the Tournament" jointly with Tamim Iqbal.

In February 2021, when West Indies toured Bangladesh, he was one of the leading run-scorers and the highest run scorer for Bangladesh in the Test series, scoring 200 runs including two half-centuries.

In June 2021, he was named in the Bangladesh's squad across all formats for their tour to Zimbabwe. During the first innings of the one-off Test against Zimbabwe, he ended up five runs short of his maiden Test century, He along with Mahmudullah, sustained a 138-runs partnership, which was the second highest seventh wicket partnership and the highest seventh wicket partnership for Bangladesh in Tests.

In September 2021, he was named in Bangladesh's squad for the 2021 ICC Men's T20 World Cup. In November 2021, in the first match against Pakistan, Das scored his first century in Test cricket.

In January 2022, when Bangladesh toured New Zealand for a two match Test series, he played an important knock of 86 runs in registering Bangladesh's first ever win in New Zealand and first ever Test victory against New Zealand at Bay Oval. In the second test, he notched up 102 runs off 114 balls in their second innings, which was his first test century in away matches. However, Bangladesh lost the match by an innings and 117 runs. He was the highest run getter for Bangladesh in the series gathering 196 runs in 2 matches.

As of January 2022, he attained his career best test ranking of no 12 as a Test batsman of the world in the ICC Men's Player Rankings which is the highest in the history of Bangladesh cricket.

In February 2022, in a 3-match ODI series against Afghanistan, he scored 223 runs including a century and a half century and was adjusted Player of the series. He also played a crucial role in winning their first ever ODI series against South Africa, scoring 113 runs in the series, being the second highest run-getter, at an average of 37.67. Though he could not perform well in the 2-match test series scoring only 81 runs in 4 innings.

In May 2022, In the 2-match test series, against Sri Lanka, he scored 88, 141 and 52 in three innings which promoted him to the 12th position in the ICC Men's Test Batsmen ranking with 724 rating points, which is the highest points for any Bangladeshi batter in Test cricket.

=== As vice captain (2022–present) ===
In May 2022, after Bangladesh lost their 2-test match series against Sri Lanka by 1–0, the test captain Mominul Haque stepped down from the captaincy and on 2 June 2022, Shakib Al Hasan succeeded him while Das was made the vice-captain of the test team.

On 29 March 2023, in the 2nd T20I against Ireland, he reached his fifty in just 18 balls recording the fastest half-century by a Bangladeshi cricketer in T20Is. He scored 83 runs off 41 balls and made a 124-run stand with Rony Talukdar, the highest opening partnership for Bangladesh in T20Is, helping Bangladesh to defeat Ireland by 77 runs.

=== As captain ===
In March 2021, Bangladesh toured New Zealand for a 3-match ODI and T20I series. He failed with the bat in both ODI and T20I series. In the third T20I, he captained Bangladesh for the first time in T20I in the absence of regular captain Mahmudullah who was ruled out due to an injury and Bangladesh lost the rain-curtailed 10-over match by 65 runs and eventually lost the T20I series by 3–0 as well.

Due to the injury of regular captain Tamim Iqbal, Das was named captain of Bangladesh for the 3-match ODI series against India in December 2022. Bangladesh won the first two ODIs in a thrilling way by 1 wicket and 5 runs respectively. Though Bangladesh lost the third ODI by a comprehensive margin of 227 runs. Eventually, Bangladesh won the ODI series by 2–1 margin.

Due to the injury of Shakib Al Hasan, Das became the 12th captain of Bangladesh in Tests. He scored 9 and 66 and made 6 dismissals in two innings. Bangladesh also registered their biggest margin of victory in terms of runs and overall third biggest win, in terms of runs and the biggest win in the 21st century, in Tests.

=== 2024–2025 ===
In May 2024, Das was named in Bangladesh's squad for the 2024 ICC Men's T20 World Cup tournament.

In September 2024, Das recorded 12 dismissals in the Test series against Pakistan, most dismissals by a Bangladeshi wicketkeeper in a Test series, 5th Most dismissals by a wicketkeeper in a 2-match test series. He was declared man of the match for his heroic effort, scoring 138 runs in the first innings.

In December 2024, Das was selected to lead Bangladesh in a 3-match T20 series against West Indies during Bangladesh tour of West Indies. Bangladesh later went on to whitewash West Indies under his leadership, becoming only the third team after India and England to whitewash West Indies in West Indies.

Das was selected as Bangladesh T20I Captain on permanent basis on 4 May 2025 up to T20I World Cup 2026.

He became the first and only player to achieve 9 dismissals as a keeper, century and a fifty in the same test, also most times scoring century and a fifty in the same test from no. 6 or lower position (4 times).

== International centuries ==
Key

- * – Remained not out
- † – Player of the match

Test centuries by Litton Das
No.	Runs	Against	Venue	H/A	Date	Result
1	114	Pakistan	Zohur Ahmed Chowdhury Stadium, Chittagong	Home	26 November 2021	Lost
2	102	New Zealand	Hagley Oval, Christchurch	Away	9 January 2022	Lost
3	141	Sri Lanka	Sher-e-Bangla National Cricket Stadium, Dhaka	Home	23 May 2022	Lost
4	138 †	Pakistan	Rawalpindi Cricket Stadium, Rawalpindi	Away	30 August 2024	Won
5	128 †	Ireland	Sher-e-Bangla National Cricket Stadium, Dhaka	Home	20 November 2025	Won
6	126	Pakistan	Sylhet International Cricket Stadium, Sylhet	Home	16 May 2026	

One Day International centuries by Litton Das
No.	Runs	Against	Venue	H/A/N	Date	Result
1	121 †	India	Dubai International Cricket Stadium, Dubai	Neutral	28 September 2018	Lost
2	126* †	Zimbabwe	Sylhet International Cricket Stadium, Sylhet	Home	1 March 2020	Won
3	176 †	Zimbabwe	Sylhet International Cricket Stadium, Sylhet	Home	6 March 2020	Won
4	102 †	Zimbabwe	Harare Sports Club, Harare	Away	16 July 2021	Won
5	136 †	Afghanistan	Zohur Ahmed Chowdhury Stadium, Chittagong	Home	25 February 2022	Won
