= List of Bangladesh cricketers who have taken five-wicket hauls on Test debut =

List of cricketers

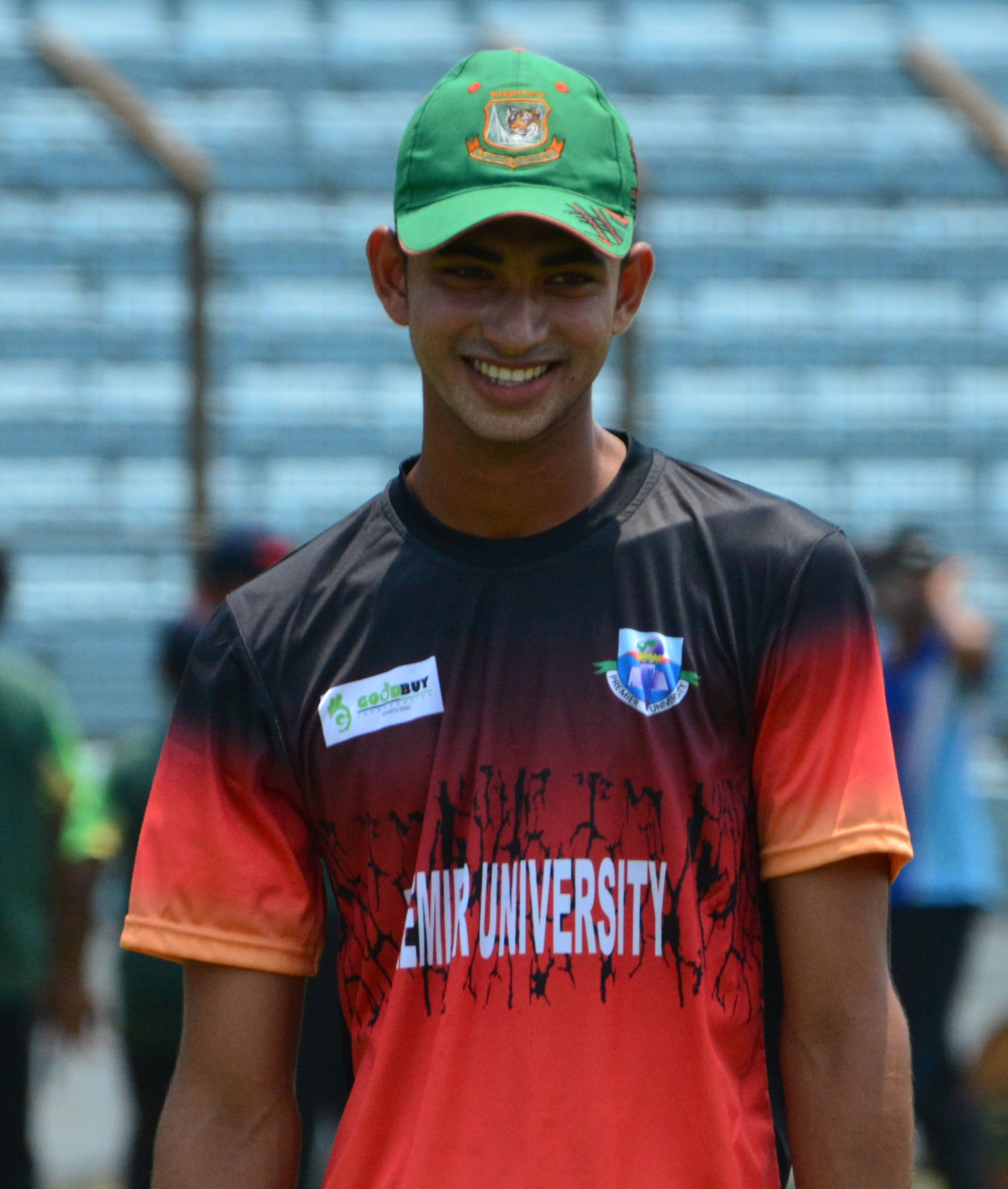
Nayeem Hasan is the youngest bowler for Bangladesh to take a five-wicket haul at debut.

In cricket, a five-wicket haul (also known as a "five–for" or "fifer") refers to a bowler taking five or more wickets in a single innings. This is regarded as a notable achievement. To date, 181 cricketers have taken a five-wicket haul on debut in a Test match, with eight of them being taken by cricketers representing Bangladesh.

They have taken a five-wicket haul on debut against four different opponents with West Indies being the most frequent opponent. Five-wicket haul were taken five times against the West Indies side. The other three times this incident occurred against three different sides; one each against England, India and Zimbabwe. Of the eight occasions the Bangladesh won the match only twice and drew once. The other five were lost. Both the wins and the only draw came against the West Indian cricket team.

The players have taken five-wicket hauls at five different venues. Five of them came in Bangladesh and the other three came in overseas. The most common venue for a Bangladesh player to achieve the feat is Zahur Ahmed Chowdhury Stadium in Chattogram, where it has occurred three times. Among the three hauls occurred overseas, two of them took place at Arnos Vale Stadium, Kingstown in West Indies. The other one came at Queens Sports Club, Bulawayo in Zimbabwe.

Naimur Rahman took a five-wicket haul in the first test Bangladesh played against India in 2000, making him the first debutant for Bangladesh to take a five-wicket haul. He took six wickets for 132 runs in India's first innings. Along with Rahman, a total of five players have taken six wickets at debut. The other four players are Manjural Islam, Elias Sunny, Sohag Gazi and Mehidy Hasan. Three players have taken five wickets at debut. Among the players Nayeem Hasan is the youngest bowler for Bangladesh to take a five wicket haul for Bangladesh.

Sohag Gazi holds the best figure in an innings by a debutant Bangladeshi bowler with his 6 wickets for 74 runs against West Indies. Gazi also holds the record for best bowling figure in a match with 9 wickets for 219 runs. Mehidy Hasan was the most economical debutant to take five-wicket haul, taking 6 wickets for 80 runs against England at an economy rate of 2.00 runs per over. (Note: In cricket, a player's bowling average is the number of runs they have conceded per wicket taken.) Mahmudullah Riyad has the best average. He took 5 wickets for 51 runs at an average of 10.20 runs per wicket. Nayeem Hasan accounted the best strike rate. (Note: In cricket, a bowler's strike rate is the average number of deliveries bowled for each wicket.) His strike rate was 16.8 when he took 5 wickets in 14 overs against West Indies. The most recent bowler to achieve the feat was Nayeem Hasan in November 2018.

== Key ==
symbol	Meaning
Date	Date the match was held. Starting date of the match for Test matches.
Overs	Number of overs bowled in that innings.
Runs	Runs conceded.
Wkts	Number of wickets taken.
Batsmen	The batsmen whose wickets were taken in the five-wicket haul.
Econ	Bowling economy rate (average runs per over).
Inn	The innings of the match in which the five-wicket haul was taken.
Result	The result for the Bangladesh team in that match.
♠	The bowler was selected "Man of the match".
‡	10 wickets or more taken in the match.

== Five-wicket hauls ==
Five-wicket hauls on Test debut by Bangladeshi bowlers
No.	Bowler	Date	Ground	Against	Inn	Overs	Runs	Wkts	Econ	Batsmen	Result
1	Naimur Rahman	November 10, 2000	Bangabandhu National Stadium, Dhaka	India	2	44.3	132	6	2.96	SS Das; M Kartik; SR Tendulkar; SC Ganguly; SS Karim; AB Agarkar	Lost
2	Mohammad Manjural Islam	April 19, 2001	Queens Sports Club, Bulawayo	Zimbabwe	2	35.0	81	6	2.31	DD Ebrahim; SV Carlisle; A Flower; HH Streak; AM Blignaut; ML Nkala	Lost
3	Mahmudullah	July 9, 2009	Arnos Vale Ground, Kingstown, St Vincent	West Indies	4	15.0	51	5	3.40	TM Dowlin; FL Reifer; CAK Walton; RA Austin; KAJ Roach	Won
4	Elias Sunny ♠	October 21, 2011	Zohur Ahmed Chowdhury Stadium, Chittagong	West Indies	2	23.0	94	6	4.08	KC Brathwaite; KA Edwards; DM Bravo; S Chanderpaul; MN Samuels; CS Baugh	Drawn
5	Sohag Gazi	November 13, 2012	Shere Bangla National Stadium, Dhaka	West Indies	3	23.2	74	6	3.17	MN Samuels; DJG Sammy; V Permaul; R Rampaul; TL Best; S Chanderpaul	Lost
6	Taijul Islam	September 5, 2014	Arnos Vale Ground, Kingstown	West Indies	1	47	135	5	2.87	KC Brathwaite; KA Edwards; DM Bravo; D Ramdin; JE Taylor	Lost
7	Mehidy Hasan	October 20, 2016	Zohur Ahmed Chowdhury Stadium, Chittagong	England	1	39.5	80	6	2.01	BM Duckett; GS Ballance; JE Root; MM Ali; JM Bairstow; SCJ Broad	Lost
8	Nayeem Hasan	November 22, 2018	Zohur Ahmed Chowdhury Stadium, Chittagong	West Indies	2	14	61	5	4.35	SW Ambris; RL Chase; D Bishoo; KAJ Roach; JA Warrican	Won
