= Elias Sunny =

Bangladeshi cricketer (born 1986)

Personal information
- Full name: Mohammad Elias Sunny
- Born: 1 January 1986 (age 40); Dhaka, Bangladesh
- Height: 5 ft 7 in (1.70 m)
- Batting: Left-handed
- Bowling: Slow left-arm orthodox
- Role: Bowler

International information
- National side: Bangladesh
- Test debut (cap 60): 21 October 2011 v West Indies
- Last Test: 8 March 2013 v Sri Lanka
- ODI debut (cap 101): 3 December 2011 v Pakistan
- Last ODI: 8 December 2012 v West Indies
- ODI shirt no.: 19
- T20I debut (cap 31): 18 July 2012 v Ireland
- Last T20I: 21 September 2012 v New Zealand

Domestic team information
- Years: Team
- 2009/10: Khulna Division
- 2004/05–2009/10: Chittagong Division
- 2003/04–2010/11: Dhaka Division
- 2011–2019/20: Dhaka Metropolis
- 2013: Barisal Burners
- 2013/14–2021: Sheikh Jamal Dhanmondi Club

Career statistics
Competition	Test	ODI	FC	LA
Matches	4	4	97	171
Runs scored	38	2	2,823	2,266
Batting average	7.60	1.00	22.05	20.60
100s/50s	0/0	0/0	3/12	0/7
Top score	20*	1*	176	87*
Balls bowled	863	204	19,659	8,116
Wickets	12	5	343	209
Bowling average	43.16	32.20	28.32	28.38
5 wickets in innings	1	0	17	0
10 wickets in match	0	0	2	0
Best bowling	6/94	2/21	7/73	5/34
Catches/stumpings	1/–	0/–	52/–	59/–
Medal record
Men's Cricket
Representing Bangladesh
ACC Asia Cup
Runner-up	2012 Bangladesh
- Source: ESPNcricinfo, 27 October 2023

Mohammad Elias Sunny (Bengali: ইলিয়াস সানি, born 1 January 1986) is a Bangladeshi international cricketer. Sunny made his Test cricket debut in 2011 and has subsequently played both Test and limited overs cricket for the Bangladesh national team.

== Career ==
Sunny made his first-class cricket debut for Dhaka Division in the 2003/04 season and has since played for Chittagong Division. He had played for Bangladesh under-17s in 2002/03.

Sunny made his international debut in the first Test against the West Indies at Chittagong on 21 October 2011. In the first innings he bowled 23 overs and took six wickets for 94 runs, finishing with match figures of 7/128.

He made his Twenty20 International debut at Belfast in Northern Ireland on 18 July 2012 against Ireland. He took 5/13 from his four overs, including a maiden to restrict the hosts to 119 runs. He became the first bowler to take five wickets on T20I debut and won the Man of the Match award. He is the only bowler to take five-wicket hauls on both Test and T20I debut.

== See also ==
- List of Bangladesh cricketers who have taken five-wicket hauls on Test debut
