= Mehidy Hasan Miraz =

Bangladeshi cricketer (born 1997)

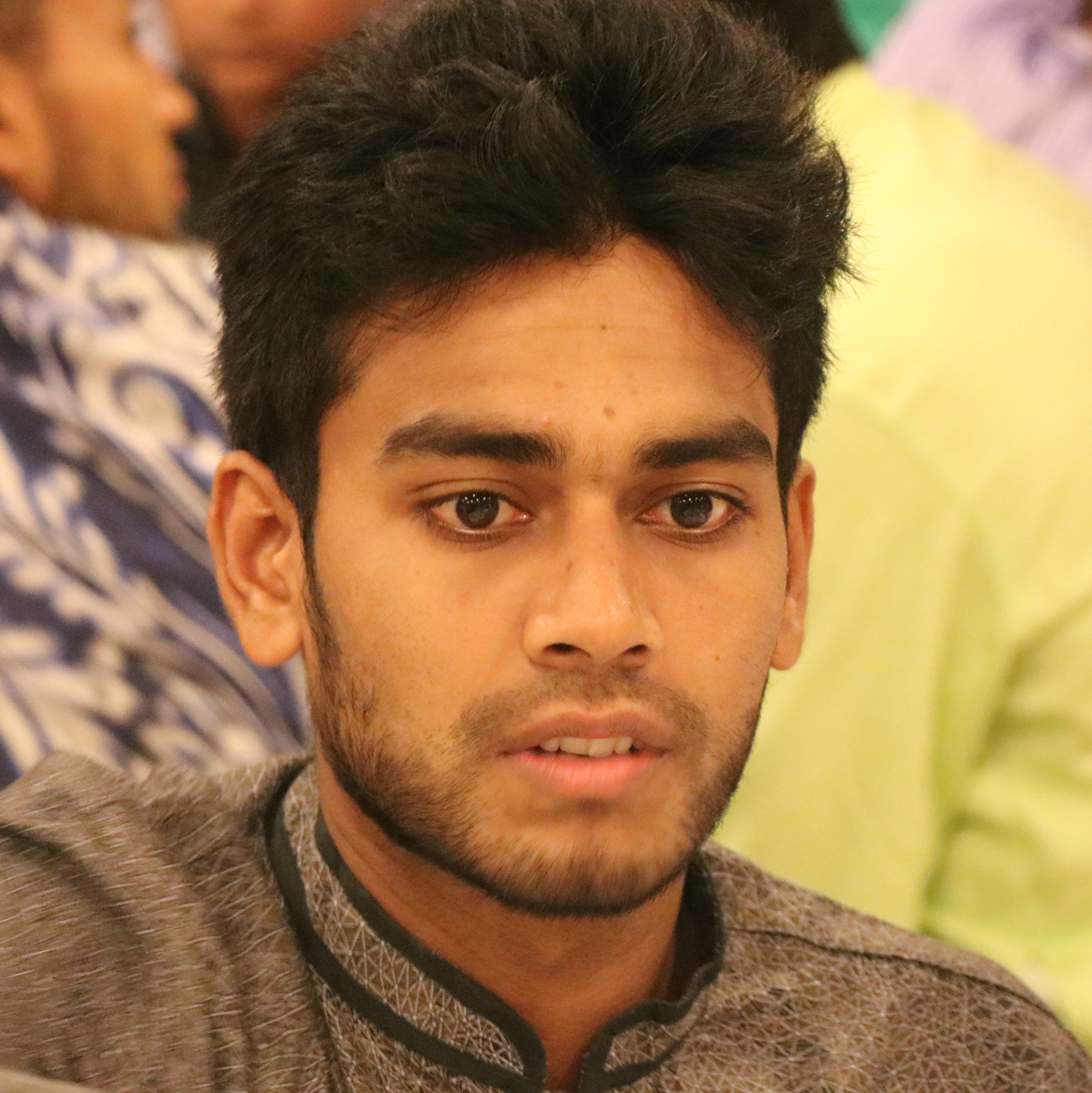
- Miraz in 2018

Personal information
- Full name: Mehidy Hasan Miraz
- Born: 25 October 1997 (age 29); Khulna, Bangladesh
- Height: 1.68 m (5 ft 6 in)
- Batting: Right-handed
- Bowling: Right-arm off break
- Role: All-rounder

International information
- National side: Bangladesh (2016–present)
- Test debut (cap 80): 20 October 2016 v England
- Last Test: 13 August 2026 v Australia
- ODI debut (cap 123): 25 March 2017 v Sri Lanka
- Last ODI: 11 July 2026 v Zimbabwe
- ODI shirt no.: 53
- T20I debut (cap 57): 6 April 2017 v Sri Lanka
- Last T20I: 24 July 2026 v Pakistan
- T20I shirt no.: 53

Domestic team information
- Years: Team
- 2014–2016: Kalabagan
- 2015–present: Khulna Division
- 2016–2018/19: Rajshahi Kings
- 2019/20: Khulna Tigers
- 2021/22: Chattogram Challengers
- 2023–2024: Fortune Barishal
- 2024/25: Khulna Tigers
- 2025: Lahore Qalandars
- 2026: Galle Gallants

Career statistics
Competition	Test	ODI	T20I	FC
Matches	59	125	34	82
Runs scored	2,296	1,889	418	3246
Batting average	24.16	23.91	16,72	27.27
100s/50s	2/10	2/7	0/0	2/19
Top score	104	112*	46	104
Balls bowled	13891	6119	468	19749
Wickets	224	132	18	327
Bowling average	31.83	36.36	37.05	29.07
5 wickets in innings	15	0	0	23
10 wickets in match	3	0	0	5
Best bowling	7/58	4/25	4/12	7/24
Catches/stumpings	44/–	55/–	16/–	63/–
- Source: ESPNcricinfo, 16 August 2026

Mehidy Hasan Miraz (Bengali: মেহেদী হাসান মিরাজ; born 25 October 1997) is a Bangladeshi international cricketer who plays for the Bangladesh national team. He is a bowling all-rounder, a right-handed batter and a right-arm off break bowler.

== Early and personal life ==
Miraz was born at Khalispur Thana under Khulna district and grew up in Khalishpur of Khulna city. He started playing cricket when he was 8. He went to Kashipur Cricket Academy from where he was first selected for the Under-14 national cricket tournament. Miraz was discovered by Sheikh Salahuddin and learned offspin from him.

On 15 March 2019, along with several members of the Bangladesh test team, Miraz was moments from entering the Al Noor mosque in Christchurch, New Zealand when a terrorist attack began. All members of the team were "deeply affected".

=== Marriage ===
Miraz decided to marry his long-time fiancée Rabeya Akhter Priti on 21 March 2019 to overcome “the shock” of the Christchurch terror attack the previous week.

== 2016 Under-19 World Cup ==
In December 2015, Miraz was named as the captain of Bangladesh's squad for the 2016 Under-19 Cricket World Cup. Despite playing as an opener in majority of his tenure in the Under-19, Under-17 and other domestic tournaments, Miraz played primarily as a lower-middle order bowling all-rounder in the tournament. He managed to take his team into the semi-final where they lost to the West Indies. In the third place play-off, Bangladesh beat Sri Lanka by three wickets. On 11 February 2016, he was awarded 'Player of the Tournament', becoming the only Bangladeshi player to achieve this honor in an ICC Event. He scored 242 runs and took 12 wickets in 6 matches.

== Domestic career ==
On 16 February 2015, Miraz made his first-class debut for Khulna against Rajshahi, where he made 51 runs (Note: he batted in only the first innings) and took four wickets.

He made his T20 debut on 9 November 2016 playing for Rajshahi Kings in the BPL 8.

In October 2018, Miraz was named in the squad for the Rajshahi Kings team, following the draft for the 2018–19 Bangladesh Premier League. In November 2019, he was selected to play for the Khulna Tigers in the 2019–20 Bangladesh Premier League.

He played for Chatogram Challengers in BPL 2022.

In May 2025, he was signed by Lahore Qalandars for play-offs of PSL X.

== International career ==
Miraz has played 180 matches over all formats for Bangladesh.

=== Test cricket ===
On 20 October 2016, Miraz made his Test debut against England. Even though he is an off break bowler, he opened the bowling in his maiden Test innings. Ben Duckett, another debutant in the same Test match, became his first Test wicket. In the same match, he also became the seventh and youngest Bangladeshi player to take a five-wicket haul on debut in a Test. In his 2nd Test match, he became only the sixth bowler to take three five-for in his first two Tests and took 19 wickets in the Test series and became the 9th player overall and 1st from Bangladesh to win the Player of the series award in debut Test series.

For his sensational debut series against England, a new house from Bangladesh's prime minister Sheikh Hasina was gifted to him.

In July 2018, Miraz got his first away five wicket haul in Test cricket against West Indies in Sabina Park.

In November 2018, in the second Test against the West Indies, Miraz took the best match figures by a Bangladesh bowler in Tests, finishing with the match figures of 12–117.

On 4 February 2021, in the first Test match against the West Indies, Miraz scored 103 runs, his maiden century in Test cricket.

On 13 February 2021, he became the fastest (in number of tests: 24 Tests) Bangladeshi bowler to take 100 Test wickets. He broke Taijul Islam's record who took 25 Tests.

On 30 April 2025, he scored his second Test century in Chattogram against Zimbabwe becoming the 6th fastest, 2nd Bangladeshi and fastest to the double of 2000 runs and 200 wickets in Test cricket (53 matches).

=== One Day International ===
In December 2016, Miraz was named in Bangladesh's One Day International (ODI) squad for their series against New Zealand, although he did not play. In March 2017, he was added to Bangladesh's ODI squad for their series against Sri Lanka. He made his ODI debut in the first match of the series on 25 March 2017 at Rangiri Dambulla Stadium. He took his maiden ODI wicket by dismissing Kusal Mendis for 4 runs. By the end of the match, he had picked up 2 wickets for just 43 runs in his 10 overs.

He picked 4–29 in 3rd ODI vs West Indies in 2018 and helped Bangladesh win series 2–1.

In April 2019, Miraz was named in Bangladesh's squad for the 2019 Cricket World Cup. He took 6 wickets and, at an economy rate of 5.08, was Bangladesh's most economical bowler at the tournament.

In December 2020, Miraz was added to Bangladesh's ODI squad for their series against West Indies. In the second ODI against West Indies on 22 January 2021, he took his career best ODI figure of 4–25 and helped Bangladesh win the match comprehensively. This was Bangladesh's first international series since the start of the COVID-19 pandemic and they eventually won the series 3–0.

In May 2021, he was the No. 2 ODI bowler in ICC Rankings, becoming the third Bangladeshi bowler ever to hold that position; after Shakib Al Hasan and Abdur Razzak.

In February 2022, he scored 81* against Afghanistan in Chattogram, which is the highest individual score in successful ODI chase while batting at number 8 and lower.

On 7 December 2022, Miraz scored his maiden century in an innings of 100* (83) in the second match of a bilateral series against India, ultimately playing a match-winning knock to seal the series for Bangladesh. With this, he becomes the second No.8 batter to score an ODI century, and jointly holds the record for the highest score by a No.8 batter in ODIs. He combined with Mahmudullah, who played a steady knock of 77 (96), to produce a 148-run stand, thus making it Bangladesh's highest partnership against India for any wicket.

In October 2023, Mehidy completed 100 ODI wickets in 89 matches in a World Cup match against Pakistan.

=== T-20 International ===
In April 2017, Miraz was named in Bangladesh's Twenty20 International (T20I) squad for their series against Sri Lanka. He made his T20I debut for Bangladesh against Sri Lanka on 6 April 2017.

=== 2025–2026 ===
In January 2025, he was named in Bangladesh's squad for the 2025 ICC Champions Trophy.

== Records ==
- Fastest Bangladeshi to the double of 2000 runs and 200 wickets in Test cricket (53 matches)
- Only the second all-rounder to take a century and a five-wicket haul on the same day in a Test match. (Note: the first being Ian Botham vs New Zealand in 1984)
- Leading wicket-taker for Bangladesh across all formats in 2022.
- Named in the Wisden's Men's ODI Team Of The Year for 2022.

== International centuries ==
Test centuries by Mehidy Hasan Miraz
No.	Runs	Against	Venue	H/A	Date	Result	Ref
1	103	West Indies	Zohur Ahmed Chowdhury Stadium, Chittagong	Home	3 February 2021	Lost	
2	104	Zimbabwe	Zohur Ahmed Chowdhury Stadium, Chittagong	Home	30 April 2025	Won	

One Day International centuries by Mehidy Hasan Miraz
No.	Runs	Against	Venue	H/A/N	Date	Result	Ref
1	100*	India	Sher-e-Bangla National Cricket Stadium, Dhaka	Home	7 December 2022	Won	
2	112*	Afghanistan	Gaddafi Stadium, Lahore	Neutral	3 September 2023	Won	
