= New Zealand cricket team in Bangladesh in 2013–14 =

New Zealand cricket team in Bangladesh in 2013-14
	Bangladesh	New Zealand
- Dates: 4 October 2013 – 6 November 2013

Test series
- Result: 2-match series drawn 0–0
Most runs	Mominul Haque (376)	Kane Williamson (250)
Most wickets	Sohag Gazi (8)	Neil Wagner (7)
- Player of the series: Mominul Haque (Ban)

One Day International series
- Results: Bangladesh won the 3-match series 3–0
Most runs	Naeem Islam (163)	Ross Taylor (160)
Most wickets	Rubel Hossain (7)	Jimmy Neesham (8)
- Player of the series: Mushfiqur Rahim (Ban)

Twenty20 International series
- Results: New Zealand won the 1-match series 1–0
Most runs	Mushfiqur Rahim (50)	Colin Munro (73)
Most wickets	Al Amin (2)	Tim Southee (3)
- Player of the series: Colin Munro (NZ)

The New Zealand national cricket team toured Bangladesh from 4 October to 6 November 2013. The tour consisted of two Test matches, three One Day Internationals (ODIs) and one Twenty20 International (T20I) match. Bangladesh won the ODI series 3-0, New Zealand won the sole T20I, while both Tests were drawn.

== Warm-up Match ==
4–6 October 2013
Scorecard

Bangladesh Cricket Board XI	v	New Zealand

Match abandoned without a ball bowled
MA Aziz Stadium, Chittagong

== Venues ==
Dhaka	Fatullah	Chattogram
Sher-e-Bangla National Cricket Stadium	Khan Shaheb Osman Ali Stadium	Zohur Ahmed Chowdhury Stadium
Capacity: 26,000	Capacity: 25,000	Capacity: 20,000
New Zealand cricket team in Bangladesh in 2013–14 is located in Bangladesh

== Test series ==
=== 1st Test ===
9 – 13 October 2013
Scorecard

New Zealand	v	Bangladesh
469 (157.1 overs); Kane Williamson 114 (210); Abdur Razzak 3/147 (55 overs)		501 (148.5 overs); Mominul Haque 181 (274); Doug Bracewell 3/96 (25 overs)
287/7d (90 overs); Kane Williamson 74 (150); Sohag Gazi 6/77 (26 overs)		173/3 (48.2 overs); Shakib Al Hasan 50* (39); Martin 2/62 (16 overs)

Match Drawn
Zohur Ahmed Chowdhury Stadium, Chittagong
Umpires: Bruce Oxenford (Aus) and S. Ravi (Ind)
Player of the match: Sohag Gazi (Ban)

- New Zealand won the toss and elected to bat.
- Marshall Ayub (Ban), Corey Anderson and Ish Sodhi (NZ) made their Test debuts.
- Sohag Gazi (Ban) became the first cricketer to claim a hat-trick and century in the same match.
- 27 sixes were hit in the match, tied with the all-time record (now 4th) for most sixes hit in a Test.

=== 2nd Test ===
21 – 25 October 2013
Scorecard

Bangladesh	v	New Zealand
282 (74.5 overs); Tamim Iqbal 95 (153); Neil Wagner 5/64 (19 overs)		437 (140 overs); Corey Anderson 116 (173); Shakib Al Hasan 5/103 (43 overs)
269/3 (89 overs); Mominul Haque 126* (225); Neil Wagner 2/52 (18 overs)

Match Drawn
Sher-e-Bangla Cricket Stadium, Mirpur
Umpires: Richard Illingworth (Eng) and Bruce Oxenford (Aus)
Player of the match: Mominul Haque (Ban)

- Bangladesh won the toss and elected to bat
- Al-Amin Hossain (Ban) made his Test debut.

== ODI series ==
=== 1st ODI ===
29 October 2013
Scorecard

Bangladesh; 265 (49.5 overs)	v	New Zealand; 162 (29.5 overs)
Mushfiqur Rahim 90 (98); Jimmy Neesham 4/42 (9 overs)		Grant Elliott 71 (77); Rubel Hossain 6/26 (5.5 overs)

Bangladesh won by 43 runs (D/L)
Sher-e-Bangla Cricket Stadium, Mirpur
Umpires: Ranmore Martinesz (SL) & Enamul Haque (Ban)
Player of the match: Rubel Hossain (Ban)

- New Zealand won the toss and elected to field.
- Rain halted New Zealand's innings at 82/3 after (20 overs). Revised target is 206 off 33 overs.
- Rubel Hossain (Ban) took a hat-trick.

=== 2nd ODI ===
31 October 2013 (D/N)
Scorecard

Bangladesh; 247 (49 overs)	v	New Zealand; 207 (46.4 overs)
Tamim Iqbal 58 (86); Corey Anderson 4/40 (9 overs)		Ross Taylor 45 (82); Sohag Gazi 3/34 (10 overs)

Bangladesh won by 40 runs
Sher-e-Bangla Cricket Stadium, Mirpur
Umpires: Ranmore Martinesz (SL) and Sharfuddoula (Ban)
Player of the match: Sohag Gazi (Ban)

- Bangladesh won the toss and elected to bat
- Shamsur Rahman (Ban) made his debut.

=== 3rd ODI ===
3 November 2013
Scorecard

New Zealand; 307/5 (50 overs)	v	Bangladesh; 309/6 (49.2 overs)
Ross Taylor 107* (93); Mahmudullah 2/36 (7 overs)		Shamsur Rahman 96 (107); Mitchell McClenaghan 2/69 (9.2 overs)

Bangladesh won by 4 wickets
Khan Shaheb Osman Ali Stadium, Fatullah
Umpires: Enamul Haque (Ban) and Ranmore Martinesz (SL)
Player of the match: Shamsur Rahman (Ban)

- Bangladesh won the toss and elected to field

== Twenty20 International series ==
=== Only T20I ===
6 November 2013
Scorecard

New Zealand; 204/5 (20 overs)	v	Bangladesh; 189/9 (20 overs)
Colin Munro 73* (39); Al Amin 2/31 (4 overs)		Mushfiqur Rahim 50 (29); Tim Southee 3/38 (4 overs)

New Zealand won by 15 runs
Sher-e-Bangla Cricket Stadium, Dhaka
Umpires: Anisur Rahman (Ban) and Sharfuddoula (Ban)
Player of the match: Colin Munro

- New Zealand won the toss and elected to bat
- Al-Amin Hossain (Ban) and Anton Devcich (NZ) made their debut

== See also ==
- 2013–14 Bangladeshi cricket season
