= Nayeem Hasan =

Bangladeshi cricketer

Mohammad Nayeem Hasan
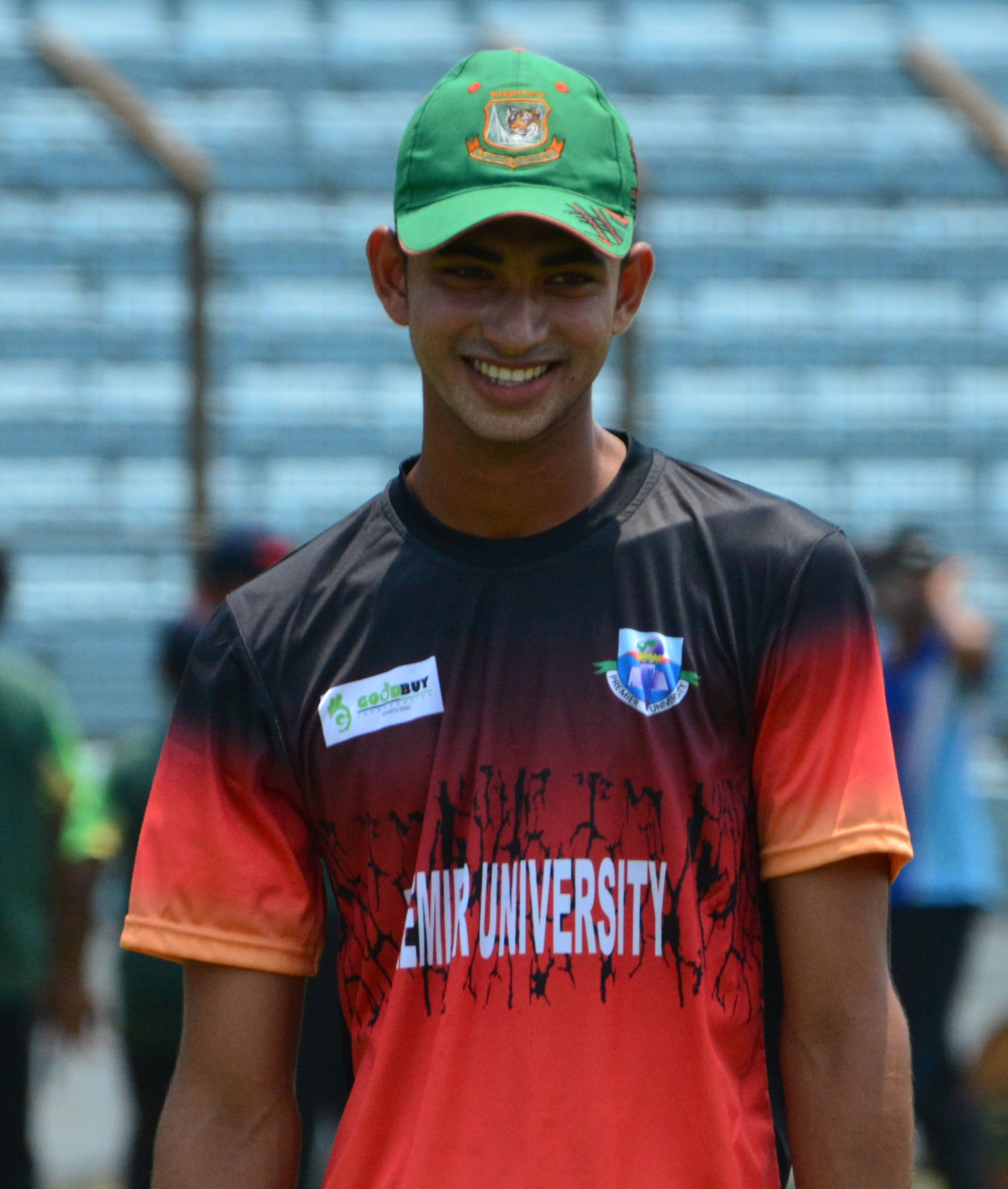
- Nayeem in 2017

Personal information
- Full name: Mohammad Nayeem Hasan
- Born: 12 February 2000 (age 26); Chittagong, Bangladesh
- Height: 1.84 m (6 ft 0 in)
- Batting: Right-handed
- Bowling: Right-arm off break
- Role: Bowling All-rounder

International information
- National side: Bangladesh (2018–present)
- Test debut (cap 93): 22 November 2018 v West Indies
- Last Test: 25 June 2025 v Sri Lanka

Career statistics
Competition	Test	FC	LA	T20
Matches	14	74	86	69
Runs scored	235	1,816	586	301
Batting average	13.82	18.53	17.23	10.37
100s/50s	0/0	0/5	0/2	0/0
Top score	26	68	51*	34*
Balls bowled	2,656	16,798	4,142	1,274
Wickets	48	299	108	57
Bowling average	28.56	27.60	27.80	26.96
5 wickets in innings	4	20	0	0
10 wickets in match	0	3	0	0
Best bowling	6/105	8/47	4/53	3/17
Catches/stumpings	7/–	47/–	42/–	29/–
- Source: Cricinfo, 27 February 2026

Mohammad Nayeem Hasan (Bengali: মোহাম্মদ নাঈম হাসান; born 12 February 2000) is a Bangladeshi cricketer. He made his first-class debut for Chittagong Division in the 2016–17 National Cricket League on 10 October 2015 and Test match debut for the Bangladesh in November 2018 where he got five wickets in the first innings, becoming the youngest bowler to take a five-wicket haul on debut in Tests, at the age of 17 years and 356 days.

== Domestic career ==
Nayeem made his Twenty20 debut for Chittagong Vikings on 29 November 2017 in the BPL 5. He was the leading wicket-taker for Gazi Group Cricketers in the 2017–18 Dhaka Premier Division Cricket League, with 23 dismissals in 16 matches.

In October 2018, in the 2018–19 National Cricket League, Nayeem took eight wickets in the first innings against Dhaka Division. He finished as the leading wicket-taker in the 2018–19 National Cricket League, with twenty-eight dismissals in six matches.

In October 2018, Nayeem was named in the squad for the Chittagong Vikings team, following the draft for the 2018–19 Bangladesh Premier League. In December 2018, in the final round of fixtures in the 2018–19 Bangladesh Cricket League, he took eight wickets for 47 runs in the second innings bowling for East Zone against Central Zone. In August 2019, he was one of 35 cricketers named in a training camp ahead of Bangladesh's 2019–20 season. In November 2019, he was selected to play for the Sylhet Thunder in the 2019–20 Bangladesh Premier League.

== International career ==
In December 2017, Nayeem was named in Bangladesh's squad for the 2018 Under-19 Cricket World Cup. The following month, he was named in Bangladesh's Test squad for their series against Sri Lanka, but eventually did not make the playing eleven.

In August 2018, Nayeem was one of twelve debutants to be selected for a 31-man preliminary squad for Bangladesh ahead of the 2018 Asia Cup. In November 2018, he was again named in Bangladesh's Test squad, this time for the series against the West Indies. He made his Test debut against the West Indies on 22 November 2018. In the match, he took a five-wicket haul to become the eighth Bangladesh bowler to take a five-wicket haul on debut. He was also the youngest Bangladesh bowler, and third-youngest overall, to take a five wicket haul on debut, at the age of 17 years 356 days.

In December 2018, Nayeem was named in Bangladesh's team for the 2018 ACC Emerging Teams Asia Cup. The following month, he was named in Bangladesh's One Day International (ODI) squad for their series against New Zealand, but he did not play. In April 2019, he was named in Bangladesh's One Day International (ODI) squad for the 2019 Ireland Tri-Nation Series.

== See also ==
- List of Bangladesh cricketers who have taken five-wicket hauls on Test debut
- List of Prime Bank Cricket Club cricketers
