= Mominul Haque =

Bangladeshi cricketer (born 1991)

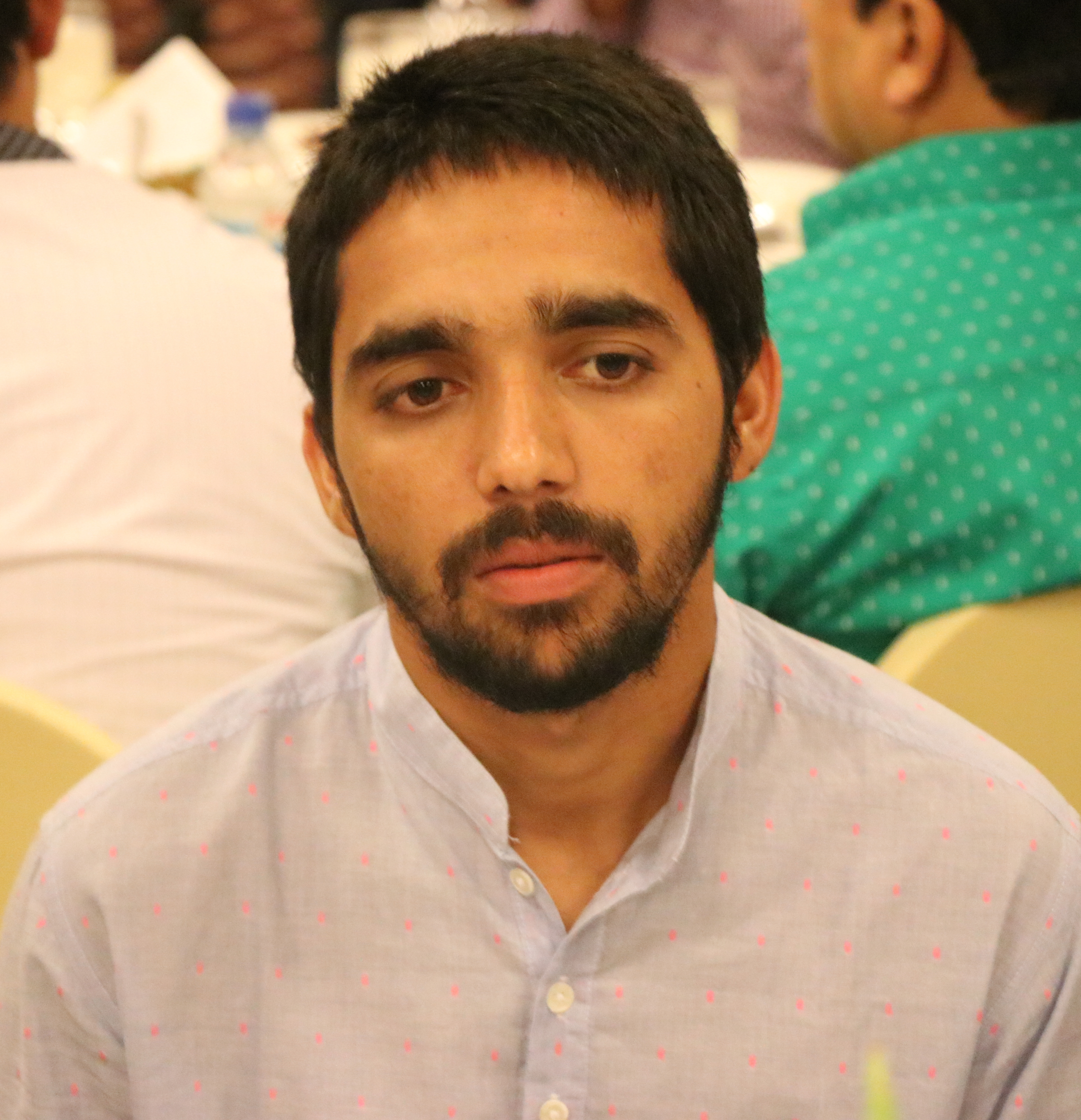
- Haque in 2018

Personal information
- Full name: Mominul Haque
- Born: 29 September 1991 (age 35); Cox's Bazar, Bangladesh
- Nickname: Showrab
- Height: 1.61 m (5 ft 3 in)
- Batting: Left-handed
- Bowling: Slow left-arm orthodox
- Role: Top-order batter

International information
- National side: Bangladesh (2012–present)
- Test debut (cap 67): 8 March 2013 v Sri Lanka
- Last Test: 13 August 2026 v Australia
- ODI debut (cap 104): 30 November 2012 v West Indies
- Last ODI: 26 September 2018 v Pakistan
- ODI shirt no.: 68
- T20I debut (cap 34): 10 December 2012 v West Indies
- Last T20I: 1 April 2014 v Australia
- T20I shirt no.: 68

Domestic team information
- Years: Team
- 2008/09: Dhaka Division
- 2009/10–present: Chittagong Division
- 2012: Barisal Burners
- 2013: Sylhet Royals
- 2015: Sylhet Super Stars
- 2016–2019: Rajshahi Kings
- 2019/20: Dhaka Platoon
- 2022: Comilla Victorians
- 2024: Rangpur Riders

Career statistics
Competition	Test	ODI	T20I	FC
Matches	79	28	6	166
Runs scored	5,210	557	60	10,934
Batting average	38.30	22.28	20.00	39.47
100s/50s	13/28	0/3	0/0	29/54
Top score	181	60	26*	258
Balls bowled	979	234	18	2,632
Wickets	11	7	0	24
Bowling average	55.45	27.14	–	68.12
5 wickets in innings	0	0	0	0
10 wickets in match	0	0	0	0
Best bowling	3/4	2/13	–	3/4
Catches/stumpings	46/–	4/–	1/–	92/–
- Source: ESPNcricinfo, 16 August 2026

Mominul Haque (Bengali: মমিনুল হক; born 29 September 1991) is a Bangladeshi cricketer who has represented the national team since 2012. A left-handed batter, he has accumulated over 5,000 runs in his Test career, which stands as the third-highest for Bangladesh as of May 2026. Haque also served as the team's Test captain from 2019 to 2022. He has been credited for improving fast bowling in Bangladesh.

Beginning his first-class career in the National Cricket League (NCL) with Dhaka Division in 2008, Haque moved to Chittagong Division the following year, where he has remained ever since. He has also played for multiple teams in the Bangladesh Premier League (BPL) since its inaugural season in 2012.

== Domestic career ==
Haque made his first-class cricket debut during the 2008–09 season, playing in a National Cricket League (NCL) match for Dhaka Division against Chittagong Division. He made his List A cricket debut for the team later in the season, but these were his only matches for Dhaka, and by the following season he was playing for Chittagong in the NCL. As of December 2022 he has continued to play for Chittagong in domestic cricket as well as East Zone in the Bangladesh Cricket League tournament.

After making his Twenty20 cricket debut for a Bangladesh Cricket Board XI against the touring West Indians in 2011, Haque was selected to play for Barisal Burners in the 2012 Bangladesh Premier League, the league's first season. He has since played in the competition for five of the eight franchises to have competed.

In 2013–14 he scored 129 runs, batting alongside Roshen Silva to set a new highest fourth-wicket partnership in List A cricket, the pair scored 276 runs playing for Prime Doleshwar Sporting Club against Abahani Limited in a Dhaka Premier Division match. As of December 2022 this remains the highest fourth wicket partnership in any List A cricket match.

== International career ==
During the first Youth Test of the Bangladesh Under-19 tour of England in July 2009, Haque was the highest run scorer in both innings for his team, with 90 and 80, respectively. The following year in January, he was part of the squad for the Under-19 World Cup in New Zealand, where his team finished ninth. In November 2011, Haque represented Bangladesh A, scoring 150 runs in the first innings of an unofficial Test away against West Indies A, which included a 259-run partnership with Nasir Hossain.

Haque made both his One Day International (ODI) and Twenty20 (T20) debuts against the West Indies in a home series in November and December 2012 as a replacement for the injured Shakib Al Hasan. In four matches he scored 69 runs and took two wickets. He made his Test debut in March 2013, playing against Sri Lanka at Galle, where he scored a half-century on debut and finished the tour with 156 runs in three innings at a batting average of 52.00 runs in his maiden Test series.

He made his first century in a Test match against New Zealand at Chittagong in 2013, scored from exactly 100 balls. In the second Test of the series, Haque scored another century, becoming only the second Bangladesh batsman after Tamim Iqbal to hit centuries in two consecutive Test matches. He scored another century at Chittagong during the season, this time against the touring Sri Lankans.

In November 2014 Haque scored his fourth Test century, again at Chittagong, this time with Zimbabwe as the opponents. By May 2015 he had played 15 Test matches and became only the fifth batsman to score a half-century in at least one innings of a Test match in 11 consecutive matches.

After a half-century during the team's tour of New Zealand in early 2017, he struggled for form and was dropped from the squad ahead of Australia's tour of Bangladesh in August. Twenty-four hours later he was recalled for the first Test.

In January 2018, Haque scored centuries in each innings of the first Test against Sri Lanka, the first Bangladeshi batsman to do so, scoring 176 and 105 not out.

=== Test captaincy (2019–2022) ===
Haque captained the Bangladesh A team in 2015. He was appointed as the 11th captain of Bangladesh's Test team in October 2019 when Shakib Al Hasan was banned from all forms of cricket for two years by the International Cricket Council after breaching the ICC's Anti-Corruption code. Haque's first series as a Test captain was the two-match tour of India in November 2019. Bangladesh lost both matches by an innings inside three days.

His first victory as captain came in the February 2020 one-off Test against Zimbabwe, Bangladesh winning by an innings and 106 runs. Haque scored 132 runs, his first century as captain, and equaled Tamim Iqbal's Bangladesh record of scoring nine Test centuries. The COVID-19 pandemic saw Bangladesh play no Test matches until February 2021 when a weakened West Indies team toured the country. Many of West Indies established players refused to tour citing COVID-19 concerns, but the team still defeated Bangladesh by three wickets in the first Test, chasing a total of 395, the fifth-highest successful run chase. In the second Test, chasing 248 Bangladesh fell short, losing both Test matches on the tour.

In April 2021, Bangladesh toured Sri Lanka for a two-match series. Haque scored 127 in the first Test, his first Test century outside of Bangladesh. After securing a draw in the first Test, Bangladesh lost the second by 209 runs. A second victory as captain came, however, in July in a one-off Test in Zimbabwe, Bangladesh winning by 220 runs. In late 2021, Pakistan toured Bangladesh, Bangladesh losing both Test matches played on the tour, despite rain washing out most of day two and all of day three of the second Test.

Bangladesh toured New Zealand in January 2022 for another two-match series. In the first Test at Bay Oval, Bangladesh won by eight wickets, their first win in New Zealand in any format in 33 matches as well as their first Test match victory against a New Zealand team. New Zealand won the second Test inside three days to draw the series 1–1.

Haque's record as captain
Format	Matches	Won	Lost	Drawn
Test	17	3	12	2
As of 6 December 2022

The first Test of Bangladesh's tour of South Africa in early 2022 was Haque's 50th Test match, and he became the seventh Bangladeshi to play 50 or more Tests. The team lost heavily again. Haque's final Test series as captain saw a draw and a loss against Sri Lanka in May 2022, after which Shakib al Hasan was reinstated as Bangladesh's Test captain after he returned from suspension and Haque resigned as captain following a run of poor batting performances.

== Records and achievements ==
Haque is one of only six batsmen, and the only Bangladeshi, to score 11 or more consecutive scores of at least fifty in Test matches. He was the first Bangladeshi to score centuries in both innings of a Test match and the first Bangladeshi batsman to score 10 centuries in Test cricket.

=== International centuries ===
As of November 2024 Haque has scored 13 centuries in Test matches, the most by any Bangladeshi batsman. He is yet to score a century in either One Day International or Twenty20 International cricket.

Test centuries scored by Mominul Haque
No.	Score	Opponents	Inn.	Venue	Date	Result	Ref
1	181	New Zealand	2	Chittagong	9 October 2013	Draw	
2	126*	New Zealand	3	Mirpur	21 October 2013	Draw	
3	100*	Sri Lanka	4	Chittagong	4 February 2014	Draw	
4	131*	Zimbabwe	3	Chittagong	12 November 2014	Bangladesh won	
5	176	Sri Lanka	1	Chittagong	31 January 2018	Draw	
6	105	Sri Lanka	3	Chittagong	31 January 2018	Draw	
7	161	Zimbabwe	1	Mirpur	11 November 2018	Bangladesh won	
8	120	West Indies	1	Chittagong	22 November 2018	Bangladesh won	
9	132	Zimbabwe	2	Mirpur	22 February 2020	Bangladesh won	
10	115	West Indies	3	Chattogram	3 February 2021	West Indies won	
11	127	Sri Lanka	1	Pallekele	21 April 2021	Draw	
12	121*	Afghanistan	3	Mirpur	16 June 2023	Bangladesh won	
13	107*	India	1	Kanpur	30 September 2024	India won	
