= Bir Shrestho Flight Lieutenant Matiur Rahman Cricket Stadium =

Cricket stadium

Coordinates: 22°21′20.89″N 91°46′4.51″E

Bir Shreshtho Flight Lieutenant Matiur Rahman Cricket Stadium
- Chattogram Cricket Stadium
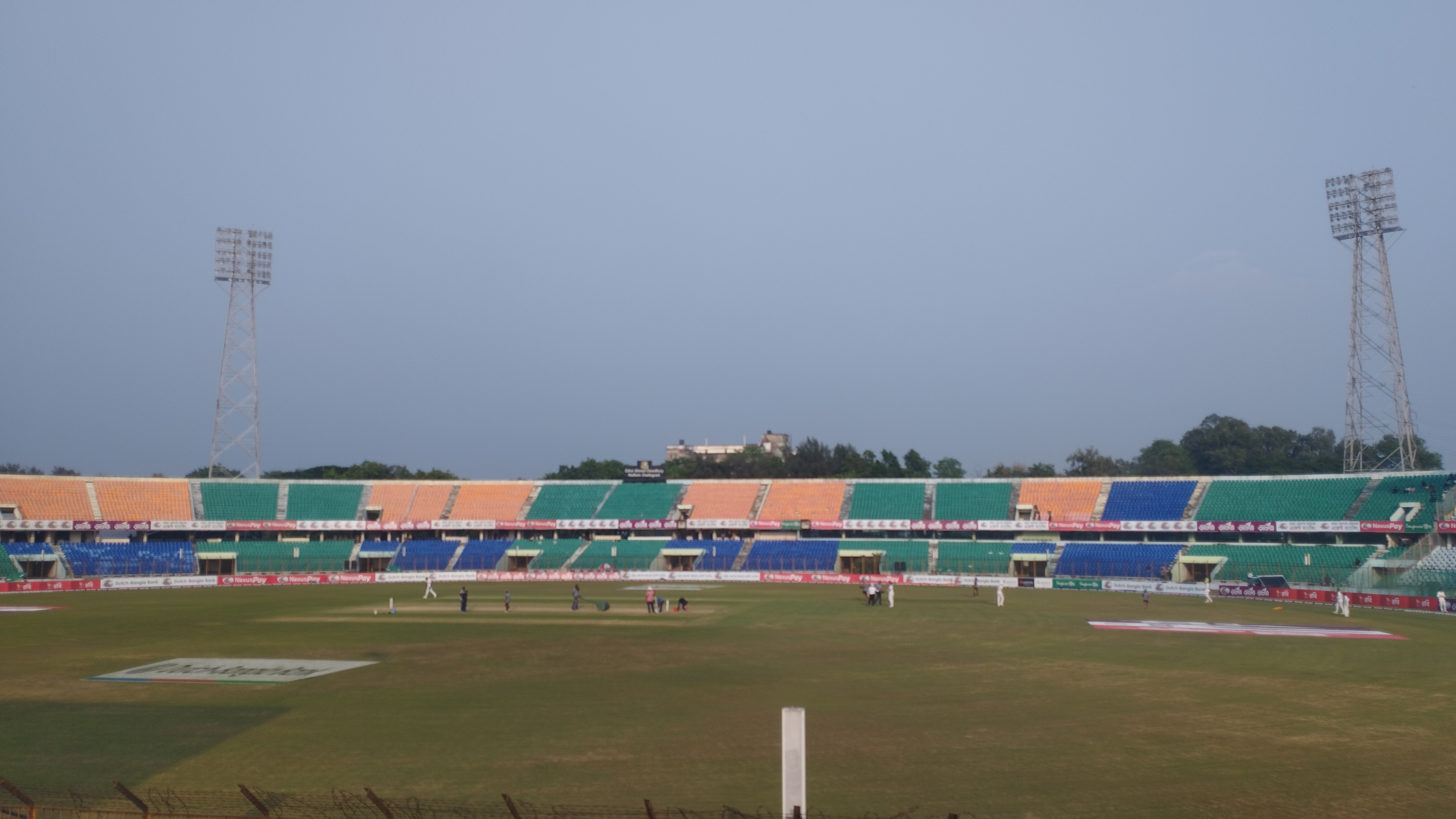
- The Bir Shreshtha Shaheed Flight Lieutenant Matiur Rahman Cricket Stadium after the installation of new seats.
- Interactive map of Bir Shreshtho Flight Lieutenant Matiur Rahman Cricket Stadium

Ground information
- Location: Chittagong
- Country: Bangladesh
- Establishment: 2004; 22 years ago
- Capacity: 22,000
- Owner: National Sports Council
- Operator: Bangladesh, Chittagong Division
- Tenants: Bangladesh cricket team, Chittagong Kings
- End names
- Walton End; Alesha Holdings End

International information
- First men's Test: 28 February–3 March 2006: Bangladesh v Sri Lanka
- Last men's Test: 28–30 April 2025: Bangladesh v Zimbabwe
- First men's ODI: 25 February 2006: Bangladesh v Sri Lanka
- Last men's ODI: 23 April 2026: Bangladesh v New Zealand
- First men's T20I: 12 February 2014: Bangladesh v Sri Lanka
- Last men's T20I: 21 June 2026: Bangladesh v Australia
- First women's T20I: 25 October 2023: Bangladesh v Pakistan
- Last women's T20I: 29 October 2023: Bangladesh v Pakistan
- As of 23 April 2026; Source: ESPNCricinfo

Bir Shreshtho Flight Lieutenant Matiur Rahman Cricket Stadium (Bengali: বীরশ্রেষ্ঠ ফ্লাইট লেফটেন্যান্ট মতিউর রহমান ক্রিকেট স্টেডিয়াম), previously known as Zahur Ahmed Chowdhury Stadium, is a cricket stadium located in the port city of Chattogram, in south-eastern Bangladesh. It became a Test cricket venue on 27 February 2006 when it hosted a Test match between Sri Lanka and Bangladesh. It hosted two group matches of the 2011 ICC Cricket World Cup. It has a seating capacity of around 20,000. The stadium was initially named after Zahur Ahmad Chowdhury on 17 June 2001 by the Bangladesh Awami League government. It was renamed after Ruhul Amin by the Bangladesh Nationalist Party government in October 2001. It was returned to its original name in 2009 of Zahur Ahmed Chowdhury Stadium after the Bangladesh Awami League returned to power. The stadium was further renamed in March 2025 after Matiur Rahman following the fall of Awami League government months earlier.

Currently, it is the main cricket venue of the port city. Previously, the District Stadium was the main cricket venue of Chittagong; however, it focuses on football now. It is also home to the Chattogram Royals, the local franchise in the Bangladesh Premier League.

== History ==
Situated about half-an-hour's drive outside the city centre, the Chittagong Divisional Stadium was one of the five purpose-built cricket grounds established in the run-up to the 2004 Under-19 World Cup. It was finally granted full international status in January 2006, ahead of Sri Lanka's tour to the country. The stadium itself is a concrete bowl set in acres of prime agricultural land, with a three-tier pavilion providing the focal point. The stadium provides views of lush trees, the port, and ships on the coast. It had floodlights installed prior to the world cup, only the fourth cricket ground in Bangladesh, giving the ability to host day/night cricket matches.

The venue has also hosted group stage matches of 2004 and 2016 Under-19 Cricket World Cup matches.

In February 2021, in the first test between Bangladesh and West Indies, West Indies won the match by 3 wickets chasing 395 runs, courtesy of debutant Kyle Mayers's 210*, which was fifth-highest successful run chase in test cricket and highest successful run chase on Asian soil, while Mayers became the first batsman to score a double century in the fourth innings of a test on debut and overall sixth batsman to score a double hundred in the fourth innings.

In March 2025, the stadium was renamed to Bir Shreshtho Flight Lieutenant Matiur Rahman Cricket Stadium (BSFLMRCS).

== Stats and records ==
=== Stats ===
Ground Figures
Format	P	H	T	N	D/N/T	Inaugural Match	Latest Match	Refs
Test	21	2	13	—	6	25 May 2007	26 November 2021	
ODIs	23	15	8	0	0	8 December 2006	28 February 2021	
T20Is	20	3	3	17	0	12 February 2014	21 September 2019	
Last updated:30 November 2021

=== Records ===
- In 2013 Mominul Haque made his highest individual score against New Zealand in this venue, he scored 181, which is 5th highest by any Bangladeshi batsmen in Test cricket.
- In the same Test Sohag Gazi became the world's only cricketer to take a hat-trick and hit a century in same Test match. He scored 101* and a six wicket-haul with a hat-trick.
- In the ICC Cricket World Cup 2011 Bangladesh first time defeated England in World Cup history.
- Winning the 3rd ODI on 15 July 2015, Bangladesh first time won a series against South Africa. In this match South Africa scored their lowest total (168/9) in ODI without being all out. This is also 2nd lowest total for South Africa against Bangladesh. This series win was 4th successive series win for Bangladesh since November 2014.
- On 4 January 2018, in the first test between Bangladesh and Sri Lanka Mominul Haque scored centuries in both innings, becoming the first Bangladeshi batsman to do so and overall 67th batsman in Test cricket. He scored 176 and 105 runs in two innings and with that he holds the record of most runs in a test (281 runs) by a Bangladeshi batsman surpassing previous record of Tamim Iqbal who scored a total of 231 runs against Pakistan in Khulna in 2015.
- On 31 January Mominul Haque became 66th batsman to score centuries in both innings of a test. He achieved this feat against Sri Lanka scoring 176 & 105 in two innings.
- On 22 November 2018, scoring a century (120) against West Indies, Mominul Haque came to the no. 5 position in the list of scoring most centuries (6) in Tests at any single ground.
- Against West Indies in 2018 by picking up the wicket of Kieran Powell, Shakib Al Hasan became first Bangladeshi player to pick up 200 Test wickets and in this process he also became the fastest cricketer, in terms of matches, to score 3,000 runs and take 200 wickets in Tests (54 matches).

== 2011 ICC Cricket World Cup ==
It was the second venue in Bangladesh of the 2011 ICC Cricket World Cup, the other being Sher-e-Bangla Cricket Stadium in Dhaka. It hosted two matches, the historic match between Bangladesh and England, where the home team nail-bitingly beat England, and the other being between the home side and Netherlands.

11 March 2011
14:30 (D/N)
Scorecard

England; 225 (49.4 overs)	v	Bangladesh; 227/8 (49 overs)
Jonathan Trott 67 (99); Naeem Islam 2/29 (8 overs)		Imrul Kayes 60 (100); Ajmal Shahzad 3/43 (10 overs)

Bangladesh won by 2 wickets
Zohur Ahmed Chowdhury Stadium, Chittagong
Umpires: Daryl Harper (Aus.) and Rod Tucker (Aus)
Player of the match: Imrul Kayes (Ban.)

- Bangladesh won the toss and elected to field.

14 March 2011
09:30
Scorecard

Netherlands; 160 (46.2 overs)	v	Bangladesh; 166/4 (41.2 overs)
Ryan ten Doeschate 53* (71); Abdur Razzak 3/29 (10 overs)		Imrul Kayes 73* (113); Tom Cooper 2/33 (7.2 overs)

Bangladesh won by 6 wickets
Zohur Ahmed Chowdhury Stadium, Chittagong
Umpires: Aleem Dar (Pak.) and Rod Tucker (Aus)
Player of the match: Imrul Kayes (Ban.)

- Netherlands won the toss and elected to bat.

== See also ==
- List of Test cricket grounds
- List of international cricket grounds in Bangladesh
- Stadiums in Bangladesh
