= Shehan Madushanka =

Sri Lankan cricketer

Personal information
- Full name: Devapurage Shehan Madushanka Kumara
- Born: 10 May 1995 (age 31); Wennappuwa, Sri Lanka
- Batting: Right-handed
- Bowling: Right arm fast-medium
- Role: Bowler

International information
- National side: Sri Lanka (2018–present)
- Only ODI (cap 186): 27 January 2018 v Bangladesh
- ODI shirt no.: 20
- T20I debut (cap 75): 15 February 2018 v Bangladesh
- Last T20I: 18 February 2018 v Bangladesh
- T20I shirt no.: 20

Domestic team information
- Years: Team
- 2017–present: Tamil Union

Career statistics
Competition	ODI	T20I	LA
Matches	1	2	19
Runs scored	7	-	207
Batting average	7.00	-	20.70
100s/50s	0/0	-/-	0/0
Top score	7	-	36
Balls bowled	37	31	1403
Wickets	3	2	14
Bowling average	8.66	31.00	41.07
5 wickets in innings	0	0	0
10 wickets in match	0	0	0
Best bowling	3/26	2/23	3/26
Catches/stumpings	0/0	0/0	1/0
- Source: ESPNcricinfo, 6 March 2020

Devapurage Shehan Madushanka Kumara or commonly as Shehan Madushanka (born 10 May 1995) is a professional Sri Lankan cricketer, who plays limited over internationals. He is a right-handed batsman and a right-arm fast medium bowler. He is a former student of Joseph Vaz College, Wennappuwa.

== Domestic career ==
Madushanka made his first-class debut against Zimbabwe Development XI. He made his List A debut for Kilinochchi District in the 2016–17 Districts One Day Tournament on 15 March 2017.

In March 2018, Madushanka was named in Dambulla's squad for the 2017–18 Super Four Provincial Tournament. The following month, he was also named in Dambulla's squad for the 2018 Super Provincial One Day Tournament.

In August 2018, Madushanka was named in Dambulla's squad the 2018 SLC T20 League. In March 2019, he was named in Galle's squad for the 2019 Super Provincial One Day Tournament.

== International career ==
In January 2018, Madushanka was named in Sri Lanka's One Day International (ODI) squad for the 2017–18 Bangladesh Tri-Nation Series. He made his ODI debut against Bangladesh in the finale match of the tri-series on 27 January 2018. In the match, he became the fourth bowler and second Sri Lankan to take a hat-trick on debut in an ODI.

In February 2018, Madushanka was named in Sri Lanka's Twenty20 International (T20I) squad for their series against Bangladesh. His T20I debut, on 15 February 2018, was also against Bangladesh. In the second T20I, Madushanka took two early wickets in one over before sustaining a hamstring injury and was later ruled out from bowling. Sri Lanka did go on to win the match along with the series. Due to his injury, he missed the Nidahas Trophy in March 2018, and several other bilateral series.

In May 2018, Madushanka was one of the 33 cricketers to be awarded a national contract by Sri Lanka Cricket ahead of the 2018–19 season. In December 2018, he was named in Sri Lanka team for the 2018 ACC Emerging Teams Asia Cup.

== Drug Incident ==
In May 2020, Madushanka was arrested for allegedly being in possession of heroin and then suspended from all forms of cricket where he caught twice within 5 years.
