= 2017–18 Bangladesh Tri-Nation Series =

International cricket tournament

- Tour logo
- Date: 15–27 January 2018
- Location: Bangladesh
- Result: Sri Lanka won the series
- Player of the series: Thisara Perera (SL)
Teams
Bangladesh	Sri Lanka	Zimbabwe
Captains
Mashrafe Mortaza	Angelo Mathews (Note: Dinesh Chandimal replaced Angelo Mathews as Sri Lanka's captain after the second ODI.)	Graeme Cremer
Most runs
Tamim Iqbal (252)	Upul Tharanga (148)	Sikandar Raza (181)
Most wickets
Rubel Hossain (9) Shakib Al Hasan (9)	Thisara Perera (11)	Tendai Chatara (6); Kyle Jarvis (6); Graeme Cremer (6)

The 2017–18 Bangladesh Tri-Nation Series was a cricket tournament that took place in January 2018. It was a tri-nation series between Bangladesh, Sri Lanka, and Zimbabwe, with all the matches played as One Day Internationals (ODIs). The Sher-e-Bangla National Cricket Stadium hosted all the matches. The second ODI was the 100th to be played at the venue and in the third match, Bangladesh recorded its biggest win in ODIs, beating Sri Lanka by 163 runs.

The final was played between hosts Bangladesh and Sri Lanka. Sri Lanka won the match by 79 runs, with Sri Lankan bowler Shehan Madushanka taking a hat-trick on debut. Following the tri-series, Sri Lanka played two Test matches and two Twenty20 Internationals (T20Is) against Bangladesh.

== Squads ==
Bangladesh	Sri Lanka	Zimbabwe
Mashrafe Mortaza (c); Anamul Haque; Abul Hasan; Mehedi Hasan; Shakib Al Hasan; Nasir Hossain; Rubel Hossain; Tamim Iqbal; Sunzamul Islam; Imrul Kayes; Mahmudullah; Mohammad Mithun; Mustafizur Rahman; Sabbir Rahman; Mushfiqur Rahim; Mohammad Saifuddin	Angelo Mathews (c); Dushmantha Chameera; Dinesh Chandimal; Akila Dananjaya; Dhananjaya de Silva; Niroshan Dickwella (wk); Asela Gunaratne; Danushka Gunathilaka; Wanindu Hasaranga; Suranga Lakmal; Shehan Madushanka; Kusal Mendis; Kusal Perera; Thisara Perera; Nuwan Pradeep; Sadeera Samarawickrama; Lakshan Sandakan; Upul Tharanga	Graeme Cremer (c); Tendai Chatara; Tendai Chisoro; Craig Ervine; Kyle Jarvis; Hamilton Masakadza; Brandon Mavuta; Solomon Mire; Peter Moor; Christopher Mpofu; Ryan Murray (wk); Blessing Muzarabani; Sikandar Raza; Brendan Taylor; Malcolm Waller

After the second ODI, Dinesh Chandimal captained Sri Lanka as Angelo Mathews ruled out of the series due to hamstring injury. Sadeera Samarawickrama was added to Sri Lanka's squad as cover for Mathews. After the third ODI, Imrul Kayes was dropped from Bangladesh's squad. However, before the final match, he was added back to squad. Kusal Perera suffered an injury during the fourth ODI and was ruled out of the rest of the series. Dhananjaya de Silva replaced him in Sri Lanka's squad.

== Points table ==
Pos	Team	Pld	W	L	T	NR	BP	Pts	NRR
1	Bangladesh	4	3	1	0	0	3	15	1.114
2	Sri Lanka	4	2	2	0	0	1	9	0.146
3	Zimbabwe	4	1	3	0	0	0	4	−1.087

Source: Cricinfo

=== 1st ODI ===
15 January
12:00 (D/N)
Scorecard

Zimbabwe; 170 (49 overs)	v	Bangladesh; 171/2 (28.3 overs)
Sikandar Raza 52 (99); Shakib Al Hasan 3/43 (10 overs)		Tamim Iqbal 84* (93); Sikandar Raza 2/53 (10 overs)

Bangladesh won by 8 wickets
Sher-e-Bangla National Cricket Stadium, Dhaka
Umpires: Chettithody Shamshuddin (Ind) and Sharfuddoula (Ban)
Player of the match: Shakib Al Hasan (Ban)

- Bangladesh won the toss and elected to field.
- Blessing Muzarabani (Zim) made his ODI debut.
- Rubel Hossain (Ban) took his 100th wicket in ODIs.
- Points: Bangladesh 5, Zimbabwe 0.

=== 2nd ODI ===
17 January
12:00 (D/N)
Scorecard

Zimbabwe; 290/6 (50 overs)	v	Sri Lanka; 278 (48.1 overs)
Sikandar Raza 81* (67); Asela Gunaratne 3/37 (7 overs)		Kusal Perera 80 (83); Tendai Chatara 4/33 (8.1 overs)

Zimbabwe won by 12 runs
Sher-e-Bangla National Cricket Stadium, Dhaka
Umpires: Bruce Oxenford (Aus) and Sharfuddoula (Ban)
Player of the match: Sikandar Raza (Zim)

- Sri Lanka won the toss and elected to field.
- The venue became the sixth and the fastest to host 100 ODIs.
- David Boon (Aus) officiated in his 100th ODI as match referee and became the 12th match referee to achieve this.
- This was Zimbabwe's first win in fifteen years against a Full Member side at a neutral venue in ODIs.
- Points: Zimbabwe 4, Sri Lanka 0.

=== 3rd ODI ===
19 January
12:00 (D/N)
Scorecard

Bangladesh; 320/7 (50 overs)	v	Sri Lanka; 157 (32.2 overs)
Tamim Iqbal 84 (102); Thisara Perera 3/60 (9 overs)		Thisara Perera 29 (14); Shakib Al Hasan 3/47 (8 overs)

Bangladesh won by 163 runs
Sher-e-Bangla National Cricket Stadium, Dhaka
Umpires: Anisur Rahman (Ban) and Chettithody Shamshuddin (Ind)
Player of the match: Shakib Al Hasan (Ban)

- Bangladesh won the toss and elected to bat.
- Points: Bangladesh 5, Sri Lanka 0.
- Anamul Haque and Sabbir Rahman (Ban) both scored their 1,000th run in ODIs.
- This was Bangladesh's biggest victory, in terms of runs, in ODIs.

=== 4th ODI ===
21 January
12:00 (D/N)
Scorecard

Zimbabwe; 198 (44 overs)	v	Sri Lanka; 202/5 (44.5 overs)
Brendan Taylor 58 (80); Thisara Perera 4/33 (8 overs)		Kusal Perera 49 (57); Blessing Muzarabani 3/52 (10 overs)

Sri Lanka won by 5 wickets
Sher-e-Bangla National Cricket Stadium, Dhaka
Umpires: Masudur Rahman (Ban) and Bruce Oxenford (Aus)
Player of the match: Thisara Perera (SL)

- Zimbabwe won the toss and elected to bat.
- Points: Sri Lanka 4, Zimbabwe 0.

=== 5th ODI ===
23 January
12:00 (D/N)
Scorecard

Bangladesh; 216/9 (50 overs)	v	Zimbabwe; 125 (36.3 overs)
Tamim Iqbal 76 (105); Graeme Cremer 4/32 (10 overs)		Sikandar Raza 39 (59); Shakib Al Hasan 3/34 (9 overs)

Bangladesh won by 91 runs
Sher-e-Bangla National Cricket Stadium, Dhaka
Umpires: Chettithody Shamshuddin (Ind) and Sharfuddoula (Ban)
Player of the match: Tamim Iqbal (Ban)

- Bangladesh won the toss and elected to bat.
- Tamim Iqbal became the first batsman for Bangladesh to reach 6,000 runs in ODIs.
- Tamim Iqbal (Ban) went past Sanath Jayasuriya's (SL) 2,514 runs at the R. Premadasa Stadium to become highest run-scorer at a single venue in ODIs.
- Graeme Cremer (Zim) took his 100th wicket in ODIs.
- Mashrafe Mortaza won his 30th ODI match, the most by a captain of Bangladesh.
- Points: Bangladesh 5, Zimbabwe 0.

=== 6th ODI ===
25 January
12:00 (D/N)
Scorecard

Bangladesh; 82 (24 overs)	v	Sri Lanka; 83/0 (11.5 overs)
Mushfiqur Rahim 26 (56); Suranga Lakmal 3/21 (7 overs)		Upul Tharanga 39* (37)

Sri Lanka won by 10 wickets
Sher-e-Bangla National Cricket Stadium, Dhaka
Umpires: Anisur Rahman (Ban) and Bruce Oxenford (Aus)
Player of the match: Suranga Lakmal (SL)

- Bangladesh won the toss and elected to bat.
- This was Bangladesh's ninth-lowest total in ODIs.
- Points: Sri Lanka 5, Bangladesh 0.

== Final ==
27 January 2018
12:00 (D/N)
Scorecard

Sri Lanka; 221 (50 overs)	v	Bangladesh; 142 (41.1 overs)
Upul Tharanga 56 (99); Rubel Hossain 4/46 (10 overs)		Mahmudullah 76 (92); Shehan Madushanka 3/26 (6.1 overs)

Sri Lanka won by 79 runs
Sher-e-Bangla National Cricket Stadium, Dhaka
Umpires: Chettithody Shamshuddin (Ind) and Sharfuddoula (Ban)
Player of the match: Upul Tharanga (SL)

- Sri Lanka won the toss and elected to bat.
- Shehan Madushanka (SL) made his ODI debut.
- Mustafizur Rahman became the fastest bowler, in terms of matches played, to take 50 wickets for Bangladesh in ODIs (27).
- Shehan Madushanka (SL) became the fourth bowler to take a hat-trick on debut in an ODI.
