= Rohit Sharma =

Indian cricketer (born 1987)

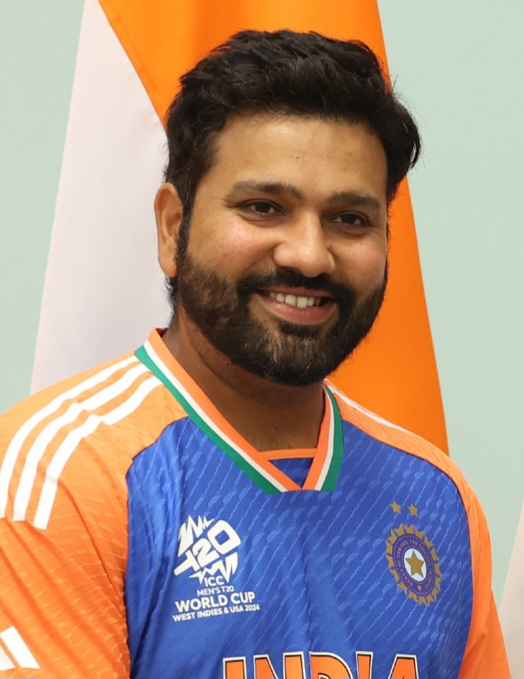
- Sharma in 2024

Personal information
- Full name: Rohit Gurunath Sharma
- Born: 30 April 1987 (age 39); Nagpur, Maharashtra, India
- Nickname: Hitman; Shana
- Batting: Right-handed
- Bowling: Right-arm off break
- Role: Top-order batter

International information
- National side: India (2007–present)
- Test debut (cap 280): 6 November 2013 v West Indies
- Last Test: 26 December 2024 v Australia
- ODI debut (cap 168): 23 June 2007 v Ireland
- Last ODI: 3 October 2026 v West Indies
- ODI shirt no.: 45 (formerly 77)
- T20I debut (cap 17): 19 September 2007 v England
- Last T20I: 29 June 2024 v South Africa
- T20I shirt no.: 45 (formerly 77)

Domestic team information
- Years: Team
- 2006/07–present: Mumbai
- 2008–2010: Deccan Chargers
- 2011–present: Mumbai Indians

Career statistics
Competition	Test	ODI	T20I	FC
Matches	67	291	159	129
Runs scored	4,301	12,120	4,231	9,318
Batting average	40.57	49.26	32.05	49.04
100s/50s	12/18	35/63	5/32	29/38
Top score	212	264	121*	309*
Balls bowled	383	610	68	2,153
Wickets	2	9	1	24
Bowling average	112.00	59.22	113.00	48.08
5 wickets in innings	0	0	0	0
10 wickets in match	0	0	0	0
Best bowling	1/26	2/27	1/22	4/41
Catches/stumpings	68/–	112/–	65/–	112/–
Medal record
Men's cricket
Representing India
ICC Cricket World Cup
Runner-up	2023 India
ICC World Test Championship
Runner-up	2019–2021
Runner-up	2021–2023
ICC T20 World Cup
Winner	2007 South Africa
Winner	2024 West Indies & USA
Runner-up	2014 Bangladesh
ICC Champions Trophy
Winner	2013 England & Wales
Winner	2025 Pakistan
Runner-up	2017 England & Wales
ACC Asia Cup
Winner	2010 Sri Lanka
Winner	2016 Bangladesh
Winner	2018 UAE
Winner	2023 Pakistan
Runner-up	2008 Pakistan
ICC U19 Cricket World Cup
Runner-up	2006 Sri Lanka
- Source: Cricinfo, 3 October 2026

Rohit Gurunath Sharma (born 30 April 1987) is an Indian international cricketer and the former captain of the India national cricket team in all formats of the game. He is a right-handed top-order batter. He represents Mumbai in domestic cricket and Mumbai Indians in the Indian Premier League. Sharma was a member of the teams that won the 2007 T20 World Cup, the 2013 ICC Champions Trophy and was the winning captain of the 2024 T20 World Cup and the 2025 ICC Champions Trophy. Sharma is widely regarded as a modern-day great, known for his leadership and explosive batting.

Sharma holds several batting records which include most sixes in international cricket, (Note: 624 as on 11 December 2024. He also has highest sixes in the T20I format (205).) most double centuries in ODI cricket (three), most centuries at Cricket World Cups (seven) and joint most centuries in Twenty20 Internationals (five). He also holds the world record for the highest individual score (264) in a One Day International (ODI) against Afghanistan in 2026 and also holds the record for scoring most centuries (five) in a single Cricket World Cup, for which he won the ICC Men's ODI Cricketer of the Year award in 2019. He is the first and only captain to lead a team in all (Note: 2023 World Test Championship final, 2023 Cricket World Cup final, 2024 T20 World Cup final, and 2025 ICC Champions Trophy final) ICC tournament finals.

He formerly captained Mumbai Indians and the team has won five Indian Premier League titles in 2013, 2015, 2017, 2019 and 2020 under him, making him the most successful captain in IPL history, sharing this record with MS Dhoni. He is also one of two players who have played in every edition of the T20 World Cup, from the inaugural edition in 2007 till 2024. (Note: The other player is Shakib Al Hasan of Bangladesh.) He is the only Indian player to win two T20 World Cups. He became the second Indian captain to win a T20 World Cup.

He has received three national honours, the Arjuna Award in 2015, the prestigious Khel Ratna Award in 2020 by the Government of India, and the Padma Shri, India's fourth-highest civilian award, in 2026, for his immense, long standing contribution to Indian cricket, which notably includes leading India to victory in the 2024 T20 World Cup and the 2025 ICC Champions Trophy. Under his captaincy, India also won the 2018 Asia Cup and the 2023 Asia Cup, the seventh and eighth time the country won the title, both in ODI format as well as the 2018 Nidahas Trophy, their second overall and first in T20I format.

== Early life ==
Sharma was born on 30 April 1987 into a Marathi-Telugu family in Bansod, Nagpur, Maharashtra, India. His mother, Purnima Sharma, is from Visakhapatnam, Andhra Pradesh. His father, Gurunath Sharma, worked as a caretaker of a transport firm storehouse. Sharma was raised by his grandparents and uncles in Borivali because of his father's low income. He would visit his parents, who lived in a single-room house in Dombivli, only during weekends. He has a younger brother, Vishal Sharma.

Sharma joined a cricket camp in 1999 with his uncle's money. Dinesh Lad, his coach at the camp, asked him to change his school to Swami Vivekanand International School, where Lad was the coach and the cricket facilities were better than those at Sharma's old school. Sharma recollects, "I told him I couldn't afford it, but he got me a scholarship. So for four years I didn't pay a penny, and did well in my cricket". Sharma started as an off-spinner who could bat a bit before Lad noticed his batting ability and promoted him from number eight to open the innings. He excelled in the Harris and Giles Shield school cricket tournaments, scoring a century on debut as an opener.

== Youth career ==
Sharma made his List A debut for West Zone against Central Zone in the Deodhar Trophy at Gwalior in March 2005. Batting at number eight, he scored 31 not out as West Zone won by 3 wickets with 24 balls remaining. Cheteshwar Pujara and Ravindra Jadeja made their debuts in the same match. It was Sharma's unbeaten innings of 142 in 123 balls against North Zone at the Maharanna Bhupal College Ground in Udaipur in the same tournament that brought him into the limelight. He visited Abu Dhabi and Australia with the India A squad and was then included among India's 30-member probable's list for the upcoming ICC Champions Trophy tournament, although he did not make the final squad.

Sharma made his first-class debut for India A against New Zealand A at Darwin in July 2006. He scored 57 and 22 as India won by 3 wickets. He made his Ranji Trophy debut for Mumbai in the 2006–07 season and scored 205 off 267 balls against Gujarat. Mumbai went on to win the tournament with Sharma scoring a half-century (57) in his second innings in the final against Bengal.

Sharma has spent his entire domestic first-class career at Mumbai. In December 2009, he made his highest career score of 309 not out in the Ranji Trophy against Gujarat. In October 2013, upon the retirement of Ajit Agarkar, he was appointed team captain ahead of the 2013–14 season.

== International career ==
Centuries against nations
Opponent	Test	ODI	T20I	Total
Afghanistan	–	1	1	2
Australia	1	9	–	10
Bangladesh	–	3	–	3
England	4	4	1	8
New Zealand	–	3	–	2
Pakistan	–	2	–	2
South Africa	3	3	1	7
Sri Lanka	1	7	1	8
West Indies	3	2	1	7
Zimbabwe	–	–	–	1
Total	12	34	5	50

=== Test matches ===
In November 2013, during Sachin Tendulkar's farewell series, Sharma made his Test debut at Eden Gardens in Kolkata against West Indies and scored 177, the second-highest individual score on debut by an Indian to Shikhar Dhawan (187). He followed it up with 111 (not out) in the second Test at his home ground, the Wankhede Stadium in Mumbai.

Having been out of the Test team since 2017–18, Sharma went on the 2018–19 tour of Australia after he had earned a recall earlier. Chief selector M. S. K. Prasad said the reason for his recall was that his natural game suited the bouncy Australian pitches. Sharma played in the first Test in Adelaide, scoring 37 and 1 in an Indian victory. During the first Test, he sustained a minor injury which saw him miss the second Test in Perth. He recovered for the Boxing Day third Test at Melbourne and scored 63 (not out) to help India total 443/7 and win both the Test and the series. After the third Test, Sharma had to return to India for the birth of his daughter.

In October 2019, in the third Test against South Africa, Sharma scored his 2,000th run and his first double century in Tests. He made 212 in the first innings of the match. Sharma was named as vice-captain of India's Test team during the tour of Australia in 2020, replacing Cheteshwar Pujara.

He had a successful home series against England in 2021. Instrumental in his team's comeback after a defeat in the first Test at Chennai, he scored a century, one that The Guardian termed "deserves to be considered one of the greatest this century." He put on 167 runs with Ajinkya Rahane for the fourth wicket while making 161 runs in an innings that included 18 fours and two sixes. India went on to win the Test by 317 runs. He top-scored for his team in both innings of the low-scoring third Test in Ahmedabad with scores of 66 and 25 contributing to his team's win. Sharma finished the series aggregating 345 runs, the most for India, at an average of 58. He went on to score his first overseas Test century on 4 September 2021 with an innings of 127 against England at The Oval, also reaching the milestone of 3,000 runs in Test cricket.

Later, he was appointed as the captain of India's Test team in February 2022, succeeding Virat Kohli, ahead of a two-match series against Sri Lanka. Sunil Gavaskar praised his leadership and Chetan Sharma, India's chairman of selectors, said: "We will groom future captains under him".

He had a poor run of form with the bat in the 2024–25 season. His captaincy also came under criticism following the 0–3 home series defeat to New Zealand, India's first Test series loss at home in 12 years, and the 1–3 away loss to Australia that followed. In his eight final Tests, he managed to score just one half-century and averaged 10.93. On 7 May 2025, ahead of India's England tour, he announced his retirement from Test cricket. He finished his Test career having played 67 Tests and making 4,301 runs at 40.57. In the 24 Tests he captained, India won 12, losing nine and drawing 3.

=== 2015, 2019 and 2023 Cricket World Cups ===
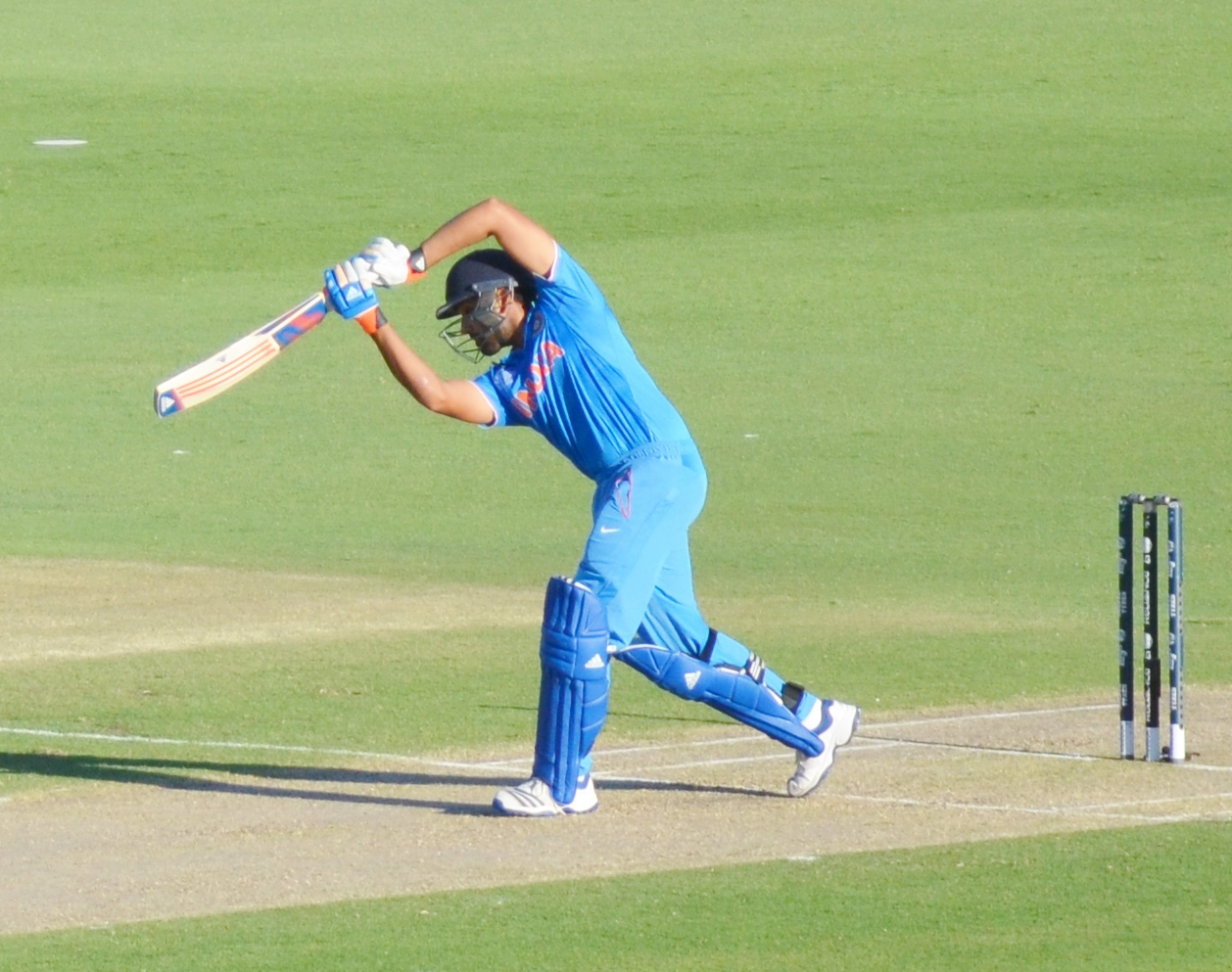
Sharma during the 2015 Cricket World Cup in Australia

In March 2015, Sharma made his first appearance in the Cricket World Cup and played in eight matches for India in the 2015 tournament in Australia. India reached the semi-final stage where they were defeated by Australia. Sharma scored 330 runs in the tournament with one century, a score of 137 in the quarter-final against Bangladesh.

On 15 April 2019, Sharma was appointed vice-captain of India's squad for the 2019 World Cup in England. In the opening match against South Africa, he scored 122, including his 12,000th run in international cricket. He followed it up with centuries against Pakistan, England and Bangladesh. In the match against Sri Lanka, hitting yet another century, he became the first batsman to score five centuries in a single World Cup tournament, and equalled Tendulkar's record for the most centuries (6) in all World Cup matches. Sharma totalled 648 runs in the tournament to finish as the leading run-scorer and win the ICC's Golden Bat award, the third Indian player to do so.

On 8 October 2023, during the ICC Cricket World Cup, Sharma was entrusted with the captaincy responsibilities for the Indian team in the team's opening match against Australia in Chennai. This significant moment marked the first time he captained the Indian team in the Cricket World Cup. What set this particular event apart was that at that time, he had become the oldest player to lead the Indian team in the tournament, showcasing his maturity and experience as a cricketer.

On 11 October 2023, during a match against Afghanistan in the 2023 Cricket World Cup, Sharma scored his record seventh World Cup century, surpassing Tendulkar's record for the most centuries in World Cup history.

=== Other one-day international matches ===
Sharma made his full international debut in a one-day match against Ireland in Belfast on 23 June 2007. This was part of the 2007 Future Cup competition which also involved South Africa. He was number seven in the batting order but did not bat as India won the game by 9 wickets.

He scored his maiden ODI half-century (52) against Pakistan at Jaipur on 18 November 2007 and was selected for the Indian squad going to the 2007–08 Commonwealth Bank Series in Australia. In that series, he scored 235 runs at an average of 33.57 with 2 fifties, including 66 in the first final at Sydney when he partnered Sachin Tendulkar for most of India's successful run chase. After that, however, his ODI performances suffered a downturn and he lost his middle-order position to Suresh Raina. Later, Virat Kohli took his position as the reserve batsman. In December 2009, following his triple century in the Ranji Trophy, he was recalled to the ODI team for the tri-nations tournament in Bangladesh as Tendulkar opted to rest in the series.

He scored his maiden ODI century (114) against Zimbabwe on 28 May 2010 and followed it up with another century in the next match of the tri-series against Sri Lanka on 30 May 2010 by scoring 101 not out. He had a run of poor form in South Africa just before the 2011 World Cup and as a consequence he was left out of India's squad for the tournament.

Sharma was recalled to the limited-overs squad for the tour of the West Indies in June and July 2011. In the first match at Queen's Park Oval, he scored 68 (not out) from 75 balls with three fours and a six. In the third match at the Sir Vivian Richards Stadium in Antigua, he scored a match-winning 86 off 91 balls after India had been reduced to 92 for 6.

He had a disastrous loss of form in 2012 and scored only 168 runs in the whole calendar year at the very low average of 12.92 with just a single half-century. Even so, his captain Mahendra Singh Dhoni showed faith in him, and his career was revived in 2013. Dhoni decided to move him up the batting order to open the innings with Shikhar Dhawan in the 2013 ICC Champions Trophy. The pairing was a success and India won the competition, defeating hosts England in the final.

His good form continued and, later in the year against Australia, he scored 141 (not out) in Jaipur. He followed that with 209 off 158 balls in Bangalore and established a then-world record for the most sixes (16) in a one-day international innings (since beaten by Eoin Morgan of England with 17). On 13 November 2014, playing against Sri Lanka at Eden Gardens in Kolkata, Sharma broke the world record for the highest score in a one-day international innings with 264 from 173 deliveries.

In December 2017, India's captain Virat Kohli was rested for the series against Sri Lanka, in preparation for India's tour to South Africa, which began in the first week of January 2018. In his place, Sharma was appointed team captain and India under his leadership won the series 2–1, their eighth consecutive series win since defeating Zimbabwe in June 2016. Sharma also hit his third ODI double-century in this series, scoring 208 (not out) to extend his record of most ODI double-centuries by a player.

In September 2018, in the absence of many top players including regular captain Virat Kohli, Sharma led India to win the 2018 Asia Cup, where they defeated Bangladesh in the final.

On 12 January 2019, in the opening match against Australia at the Sydney Cricket Ground, Sharma scored 133 but it was in vain as India lost by 34 runs. It was his 22nd century in one-day internationals. At Delhi on 13 March 2019, in the fifth and final match of a home series against Australia, Sharma scored 56 including his 8,000th run in one-day internationals. It was his 200th innings. In 2019, he scored the most runs in ODIs by any batsman, with 1,490 runs in the calendar year, including 7 centuries.

In November 2020, Sharma was nominated for the ICC Men's ODI Cricketer of the Decade award.

In July 2022, Sharma became the first Indian captain to lead their team to both T20I and ODI series wins in England. He became the 3rd Indian captain to win an ODI series in England, and the first since 2014.

In February 2025, at the ICC Champions Trophy, in a group game against Bangladesh, Rohit Sharma became the 2nd fastest player to score 11,000 runs in ODI Cricket. He achieved this feat in 261 innings, behind only Virat Kohli who achieved it in 222 innings.

During the bilateral ODI series between India and England at Lord's in July 2026, Rohit Sharma became the first Indian batsman to score a century at the venue at the age of 39. With this century, Rohit completed the 34th century of his career by scoring the 138 runs.

=== Twenty20 international matches ===
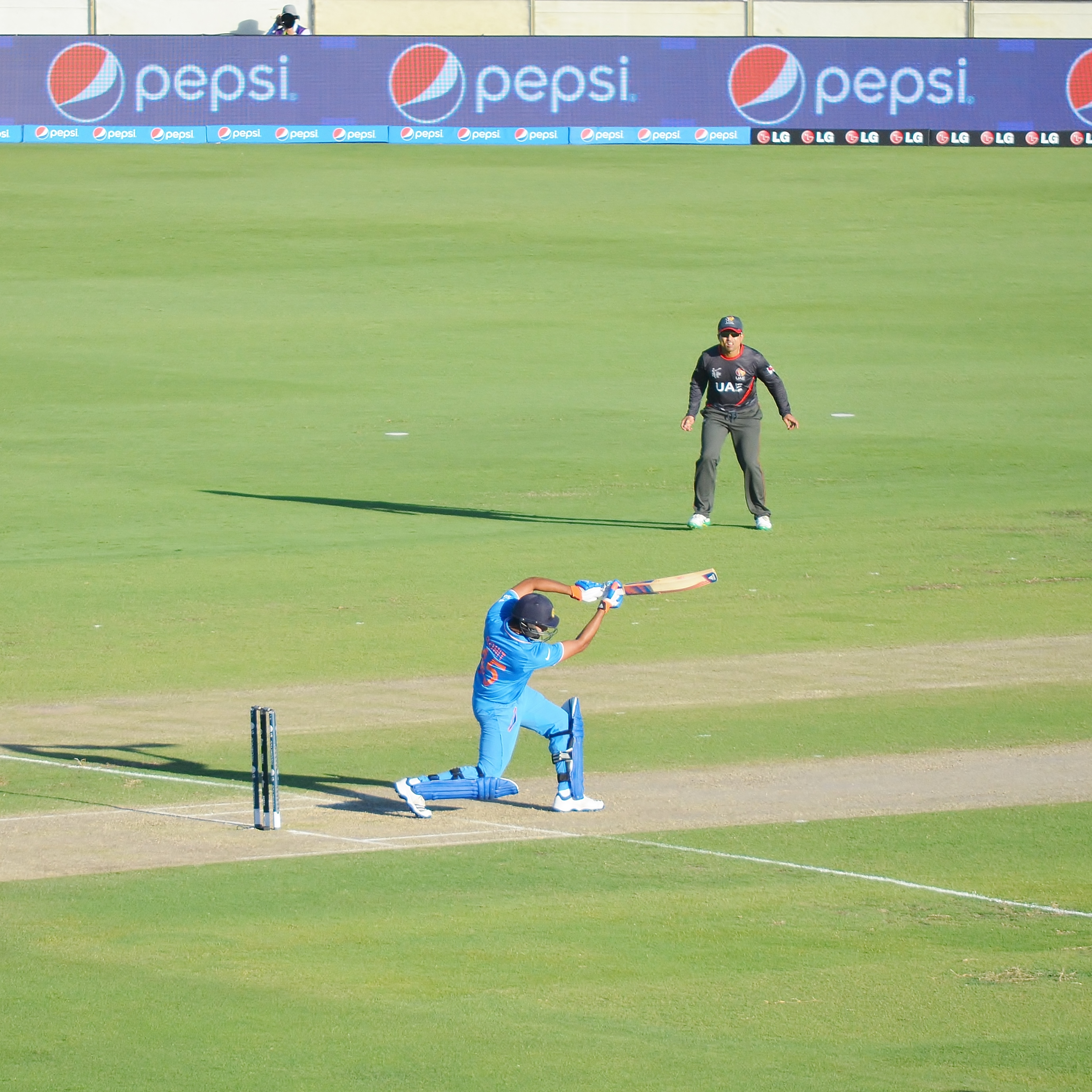
Sharma hitting a six

Sharma was included in the Indian squad for the 2007 ICC World Twenty20 and made his mark by scoring an unbeaten 50 from 40 deliveries against hosts South Africa in a must win Super Eight match. This enabled India to win the match by 37 runs and they went on to defeat Pakistan in the final, when Sharma scored 30 (not out) from 16 deliveries.

On 2 October 2015, during the South African tour of India, Sharma scored 106 in the first Twenty20 international at HPCA Stadium in Dharamshala. With that, he became the second Indian cricketer to have scored centuries in all three formats of international cricket.

In December 2017, in a series against Sri Lanka, Sharma scored the joint-fastest T20I century, in 35 balls, ending with 118 from 43 deliveries, equaling the record of David Miller. This was also his second century in Twenty20 internationals.

On 8 July 2018, during a series in England, Sharma became the second Indian batsman, after Virat Kohli, to score 2,000 runs in a Twenty20 international career. He was the fifth batsman worldwide to achieve the feat; the others besides Kohli were Brendon McCullum, Martin Guptill and Shoaib Malik. He also scored his third T20I century during this series, equaling the then-record for most T20I centuries, held by Colin Munro.

In March 2018, he led Team India to win the Nidahas Trophy under his captaincy. In November 2018, in a series against West Indies, he scored his fourth T20I century, creating a new record for the most centuries by a player in T20I cricket.

In November 2019, in the opening match of the series against Bangladesh, Sharma became the most-capped cricketer for India in T20Is, playing in his 99th match. In the next match of the series, he became the first male cricketer for India to play in 100 T20Is.

In November 2020, Sharma was nominated for the ICC Men's T20I Cricketer of the Decade award.

In July 2022, Sharma became the first captain in T20I history to lead their team to 14 consecutive victories.

With his participation in the 2022 T20 World Cup in Australia, Sharma became the only Indian cricketer to have played in every edition of the tournament since its inception in 2007.

On 27 October 2022, Sharma broke the record for most sixes by an Indian batsman in T20 World Cups, previously held by Yuvraj Singh, hitting his 34th six against Netherlands at Sydney Cricket Ground.

In May 2024, he was named as a captain in India's squad for the 2024 ICC Men's T20 World Cup tournament. In June 2024, during a match against Ireland, he achieved the milestone of hitting 600 sixes in international cricket across all formats. On 29 June 2024, Sharma led India to win the 2024 T20 World Cup after defeating South Africa in the final. In the post-match press conference after the T20 World Cup victory, Sharma declared his retirement from T20Is, while confirming that he would continue to represent India in ODIs and Test match formats.

== Indian Premier League career ==
Rohit Sharma joined the Indian Premier League (IPL) in 2008 when he was signed by the Deccan Chargers franchise, based in Hyderabad, for the sum of US$750,000 a year. In 2009, he won the IPL for the first time as the vice-captain of the team. In the 2011 auction, he was sold for US$2 million to the Mumbai Indians. He scored his maiden IPL century in the 2012 season with 109* off 60 balls against the Kolkata Knight Riders. In the 2015 season, he missed his century falling short by just two runs, scoring 98* off 65 balls in the first match of the season against Kolkata Knight Riders but it went in vain as it came in a losing cause. Again in the 2018 season, he missed his century, scoring 94 off 52 balls against Royal Challengers Bangalore coming in a 46-run win. Then he scored his second IPL century in 2024 tournament with 105* off 63 balls against the arch-rivals Chennai Super Kings but this came in a losing cause, this was his 1st century after 12 long years.

Under his leadership, Mumbai has won the IPL in 2013, 2015, 2017, 2019 and 2020; they also won the former Champions League Twenty20 competition in 2013.

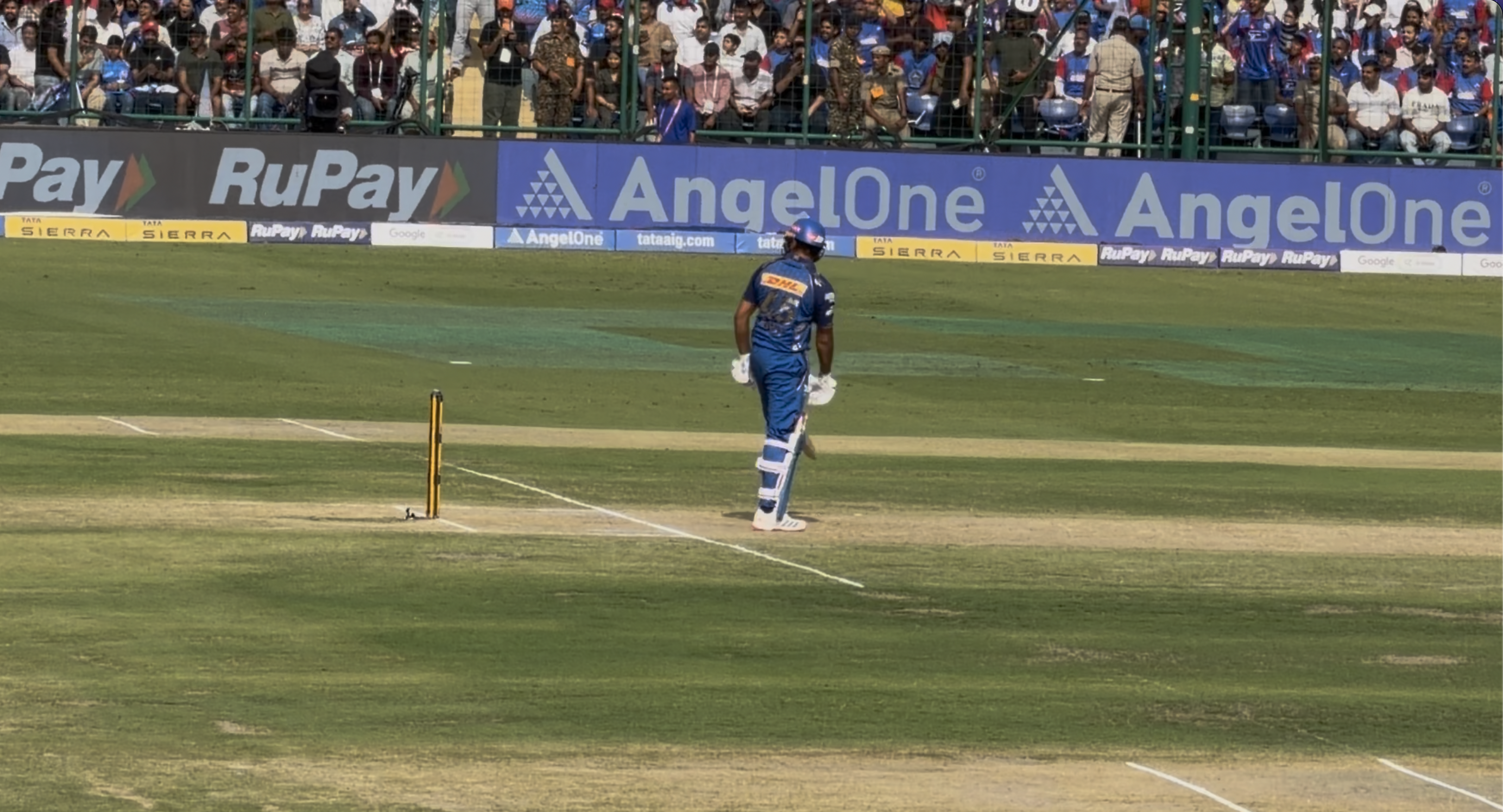
Sharma batting for Mumbai Indians in IPL 2026

Sharma has been one of the most successful players in the IPL as captain since 2013 of the Mumbai Indians, who have won the tournament five times under his leadership. He led Mumbai Indians in 158 matches securing 87 victories, making him the second-most successful captain in IPL history surpassed only by MS Dhoni with 136 victories. He is one of seven players who have scored 5,000 career runs in the competition. He has scored 7,046 runs with 2 centuries and 47 half centuries and is the second-highest run scorer after Virat Kohli (8,661). In 2024, Sharma was sacked as the captain, in favour of Hardik Pandya, their new buy. This sparked massive controversy among the fans and many were disappointed that Sharma was not put back as captain.

== Playing style ==
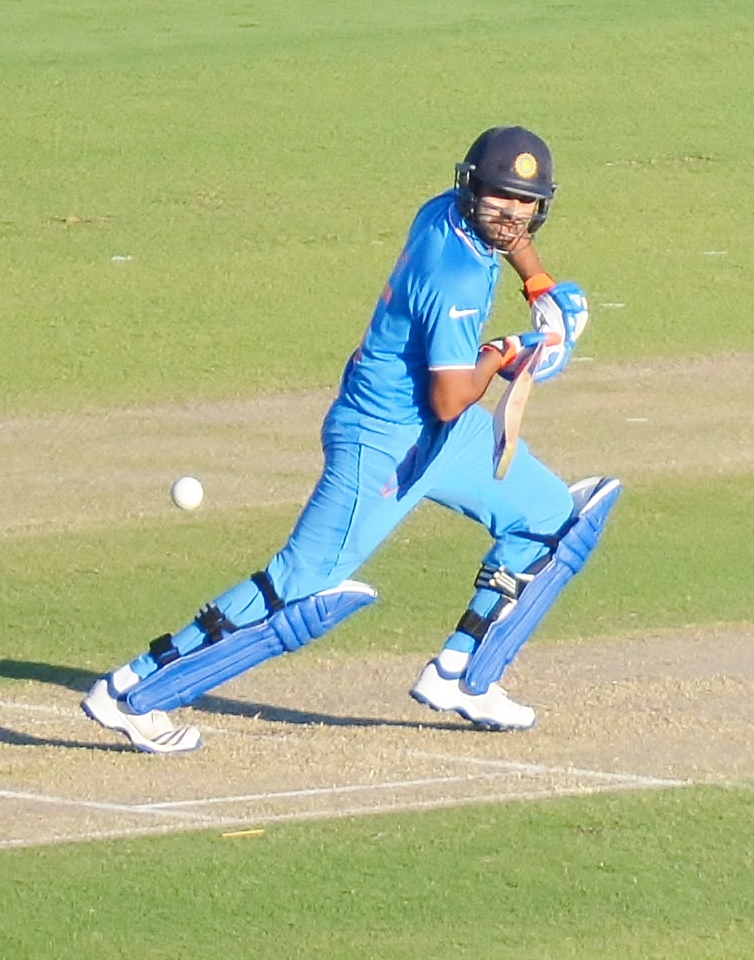
Sharma playing a late cut shot during the 2015 World Cup

Sharma is an aggressive batsman but plays with style and elegance. He is usually an opening batsman in limited overs cricket, but has played most of his Test cricket as a middle-order batsman. In limited overs cricket, Sharma is widely recognised as one of the format's most outstanding batsmen. And for his attacking batting and six hitting abilities he often referred as Hitman.

Sunil Gavaskar considers Sharma to have a batting style similar to those of Virender Sehwag and Viv Richards. In his column for The Times of India in November 2018, Gavaskar said:

The standout performer in both the limited overs series and the T20 series has been Rohit Sharma. Like Virender Sehwag before him, he is unstoppable once he gets going and like Viru he has an appetite for big hundreds. When Viru used to get out looking to hit another delivery out of the park, there used to be consternation around the ground, just like it is when Rohit gets out to a seemingly casual shot. If Rohit can turn his white ball exploits into red ball cricket, he will be the most destructive batsman in the world after Viv Richards and Virender Sehwag.

While Sharma is not a regular bowler, he can bowl right-arm off spin. He usually fields in the slips and has said this is a part of his game which he works very hard on for improvement.

== Achievements ==
Sharma scored the highest-ever individual score in a One Day International match, with a 264 against Sri Lanka at the Eden Gardens, Kolkata on 13 November 2014. He is the only player to have scored three double-centuries in ODIs. In January 2020, Sharma was named as the ODI Player of the Year by the International Cricket Council (ICC). In 2019, Sharma became the only batsman to scored five centuries in a single edition of the Cricket World Cup.

On 5 October 2019, during a Test match against South Africa, Sharma became the first batsman to score two centuries in a match on his first appearance as an opening batsman. In the same series, he broke Shimron Hetmyer's record for the highest number of sixes in a Test series.

On 11 October 2023, Sharma achieved a historic feat during the 2023 Cricket World Cup match against Afghanistan team, when he surpassed the record previously held by Chris Gayle for the most international sixes (553).

On 14 October 2023, Sharma achieved another milestone by becoming the first Indian to complete 300 sixes in the 50-overs format. This feat occurred during an India-Pakistan match at Narendra Modi Stadium, in front of more than 100,000 fans.

During a 22 October 2023 match against New Zealand, Sharma became the first Indian batter to hit 50 One Day International (ODI) sixes in a calendar year.

On 2 August 2024, Sharma surpassed Eoin Morgan to have hit most sixes in international cricket as captain.

Sharma's 19 Player of the Match awards is the highest by an Indian in IPL history.

On November 30, 2025, Rohit Sharma broke the record for most sixes in ODIs, A record previously held by Shahid Afridi.

On June 23, 2026, Rohit Sharma received the Padma Shri Award in India, at Rashtrapati Bhavan in New Delhi. His name was initially announced on the eve of Republic Day earlier in the year. He was recognized for his immense, long-standing contribution to Indian cricket and his outstanding leadership, which notably includes guiding India to victory in the 2024 ICC T20 World Cup and the 2025 Champions Trophy.

== Commercial investments ==
The Rohit Sharma Cricket Academy, established in Dubai in September 2024 under the "CricKingdom by Rohit Sharma" brand and operated by franchise partner Grasport, ceased operations abruptly in May 2025 after approximately ten months. The academy enrolled around 35 families who prepaid for advanced cricket training but experienced significant operational difficulties, including mismanagement and financial instability. Training sessions became irregular, coaches went unpaid for extended periods, and communication with stakeholders diminished, leading to the suspension of all activities in mid-May 2025. In response, CricKingdom terminated its agreement with Grasport and announced plans to independently relaunch the academy by September 2025.

In June 2025, Indian cricketer Rohit Sharma made a strategic investment in Prozo, a supply chain firm specializing in supporting India's new-age commerce sector. The exact amount of Sharma's investment was not disclosed. Since its founding in 2016, Prozo has raised a total of $20 million from investors including Sixth Sense Ventures and Jafco Asia, operating 42 tech-enabled warehouses across more than 2.2 million square feet and serving over 24,000 pin codes, with a revenue run-rate of ₹250 crore.

== Philanthropy ==
Sharma engages in numerous philanthropic activities, promoting various causes such as animal welfare, health, and children. He is particularly vocal about the protection of animals and has supported various initiatives and organisations to promote the cause.

In February 2015, Sharma joined People for the Ethical Treatment of Animals (PETA) to support sterilisation of homeless cats and dogs. When supporting the cause Sharma said, "Sterilisation is important because I feel that if we can stop (the homeless-animal crisis), there will be control of population among the street dogs".

In September 2015, along with Hollywood actors Matt LeBlanc and Salma Hayek, Sharma joined an anti-poaching campaign in Kenya to save the wild animals of Africa including the last surviving northern white rhinoceros. When joining the campaign Sharma said, "I have been a member of PETA and when I was informed about the cause, I thought it is my duty to join the anti-poaching drive. That's what got me to Nairobi. I was fascinated to have a look at Sudan (the last northern white rhino) and the sniffer dogs who catch hold of the poachers".

In November 2017, Sharma in a video on social media said that he had agreed with an online store to merchandise mobile phone covers and other items that would use his name and ODI jersey no. 45. Sharma also told his Twitter followers: "All proceeds from your purchases would go to an animal charity of my choice".

In 2018 on "World Rhino Day", Sharma was announced as the WWF-India Rhino Ambassador. Ravi Singh, the CEO and Secretary General of WWF-India, said "We welcome Rohit into the WWF family". After taking a pledge for the cause of rhino conservation, Sharma said, "My love for rhinos sparked when I first heard about Sudan, the last male northern white African rhino who died this year thus leading to the inevitable extinction of the entire species and that broke my heart. As the world and I mourned for my fallen friend Sudan, I researched the best way for me to help prevent something like this happening and the best way I know how is to create awareness. After getting in touch with WWF I learnt that 82% of the world's rhinos reside in India and I am honoured to be WWF-India's rhino ambassador to spread awareness and do my bit to contribute to the protection and survival of the rhino and help make this world a better place for them."

== Personal life ==
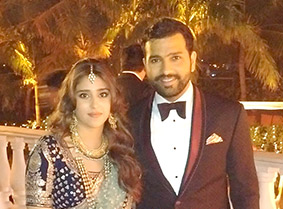
Sharma and Ritika Sajdeh during their wedding reception in December 2015

Sharma married his longtime girlfriend, Ritika Sajdeh on 13 December 2015 whom he first met in 2008. They welcomed their first child, a daughter born on 30 December 2018. Their second child, a son, was born on 15 November 2024. Sharma is a practitioner of the meditation technique Sahaj Marg.

=== Commercial endorsements ===
Sharma has been sponsored by several brands including CEAT and the Swiss watchmaker Hublot. In his career, Sharma has endorsed many other brands including Maggi, Glow & Lovely, Lay's, Nissan, energy drink Relentless, Nasivion nasal spray, Aristocrat by VIP Industries, Adidas and Oppo mobiles.

== Television appearances ==
Year	Title	Role	Notes	Ref.
2024	The Great Indian Kapil Show	Guest/Himself	Talk show on Netflix	
2026	Family Full House with Rohit Sharma	Host	Game Show	

Awards
Preceded by Virat Kohli	ICC ODI Player of the Year; 2019	Succeeded by Babar Azam
