= List of One Day International cricket hat-tricks =

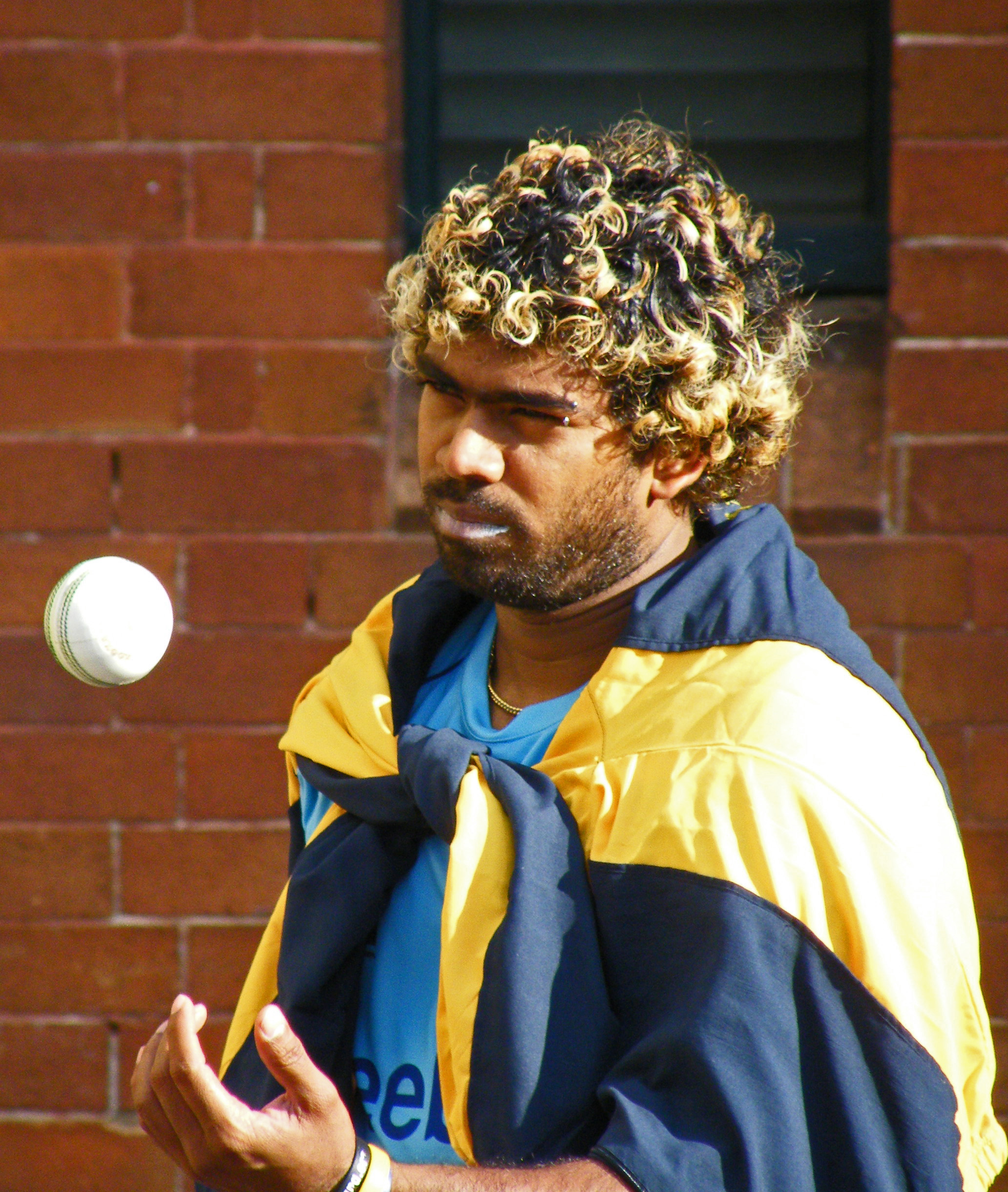
Sri Lanka's Lasith Malinga is the only cricketer to have taken three ODI hat-tricks.

A hat-trick in cricket is when a bowler takes three wickets on consecutive deliveries, dismissing three different batsmen. It is a relatively rare event in One Day International (ODI) cricket with only 52 occurrences in over 4800 matches since the first ODI match between Australia and England on 5 January 1971. The first ODI hat-trick was taken by Pakistan's Jalal-ud-Din against Australia in Hyderabad, Sindh, in September 1982. The most recent player to achieve this feat is Dilshan Madushanka of Sri Lanka against Zimbabwe in August 2025.

The only bowler to have taken three ODI hat-tricks is Sri Lanka's Lasith Malinga. Five other bowlers— Pakistan's Wasim Akram and Saqlain Mushtaq, Sri Lanka's Chaminda Vaas, New Zealand's Trent Boult and India's Kuldeep Yadav—have taken two hat-tricks in the format. Vaas is the first and only bowler to claim a hat-trick on the first three balls of any form of international cricket; he achieved the feat against Bangladesh during the 2003 World Cup. Malinga is the only player to claim four wickets in consecutive balls; he achieved the feat against South Africa in the 2007 World Cup. Four players have taken a hat-trick on their ODI debuts: Bangladesh's Taijul Islam against Zimbabwe in 2014, South Africa's Kagiso Rabada against Bangladesh in 2015, Sri Lanka's Wanindu Hasaranga against Zimbabwe in 2017, and Sri Lanka's Shehan Madushanka against Bangladesh in 2018. India's Chetan Sharma was the first cricketer to take a hat-trick in a World Cup match. Eleven hat-tricks have been taken in World Cup matches.

Pakistan's Wasim Akram and Mohammad Sami are the only players to have taken hat-tricks in ODIs and Tests. Brett Lee (Australia), Lasith Malinga, Thisara Perera, Wanindu Hasaranga (all 3 from Sri Lanka) and Kagiso Rabada are the only players to have taken hat-tricks in ODIs and Twenty20 matches.

== Hat-tricks ==
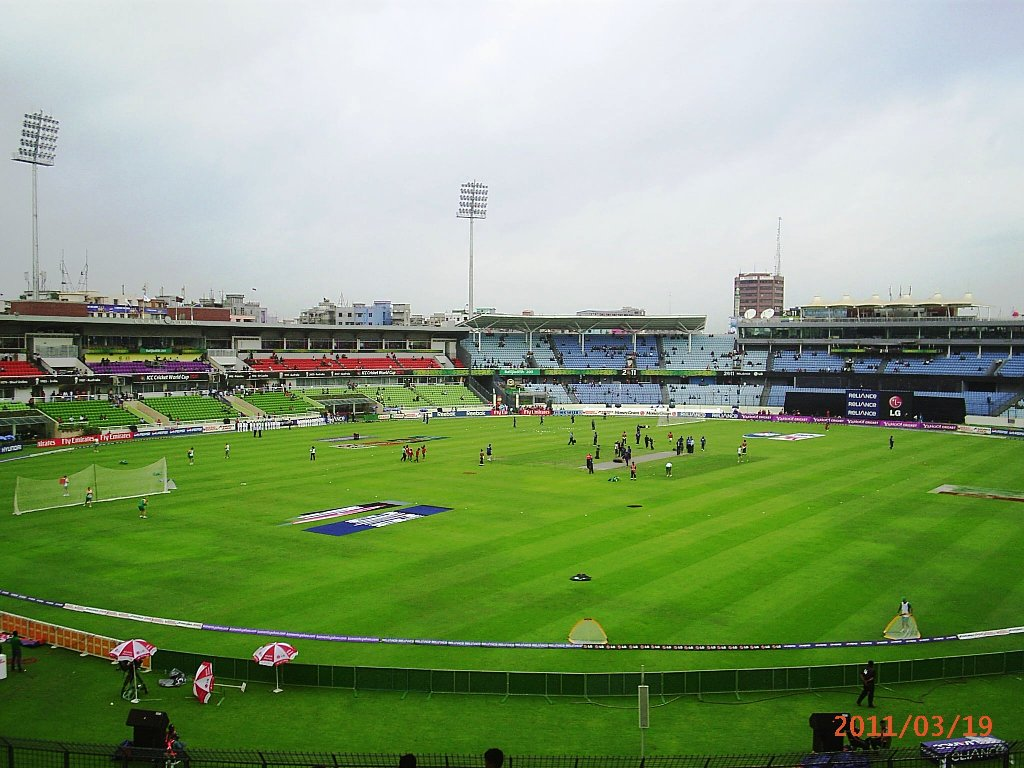
Sher-e-Bangla National Cricket Stadium is involved in both most number ODI of hat-tricks (5) as well as most number of hat-tricks by debutants (3)

Key

Symbol	Meaning
^{W}	Hat-trick taken in a World Cup match
^{D}	Hat-trick taken by a debutant player
(b)	Bowled
(c)	Caught
(c & b)	Caught and bowled
(lbw)	Leg before wicket
(st)	Stumped
†	Wicket-keeper

List of Hat-tricks in One Day Internationals
No.	ODI No.	Bowler	For	Against	Wickets	Venue	Date	Ref.
1.	158	Jalal-ud-Din	Pakistan	Australia	Rod Marsh (b); Bruce Yardley (c †Wasim Bari); Geoff Lawson (b)	(Pakistan) Niaz Stadium, Hyderabad	20 September 1982	
2. ^{[H]}	359	Bruce Reid	Australia	New Zealand	Bruce Blair (c Greg Matthews); Ervin McSweeney (c Allan Border); Stu Gillespie (b)	(Australia) Sydney Cricket Ground, Sydney	29 January 1986	
3.	474	Chetan Sharma	India	New Zealand	Ken Rutherford (b); Ian Smith (b); Ewen Chatfield (b)	(India) Vidarbha Cricket Association Ground, Nagpur	31 October 1987 ^{W}	
4.	570	Wasim Akram (1/2)	Pakistan	West Indies	Jeff Dujon (b); Malcolm Marshall (b); Curtly Ambrose (b)	(United Arab Emirates) Sharjah Stadium, Sharjah	14 October 1989	
5.^{[A]}	631	Wasim Akram (2/2)	Pakistan	Australia	Merv Hughes (b); Carl Rackemann (b); Terry Alderman (b)	(United Arab Emirates) Sharjah Stadium, Sharjah	4 May 1990	
6. ^{[H]}	661	Kapil Dev	India	Sri Lanka	Roshan Mahanama (c †Kiran More); Rumesh Ratnayake (lbw); Sanath Jayasuriya (c Sanjay Manjrekar)	(India) Eden Gardens, Calcutta	4 January 1991	
7.^{[B]}	685	Aaqib Javed	Pakistan	India	Ravi Shastri (lbw); Mohammad Azharuddin (lbw); Sachin Tendulkar (lbw)	(United Arab Emirates) Sharjah Stadium, Sharjah	25 October 1991	
8. ^{[H]}	896	Danny Morrison	New Zealand	India	Kapil Dev (b); Salil Ankola (b); Nayan Mongia (b)	(New Zealand) McLean Park, Napier	25 March 1994	
9.^{[A]}	966	Waqar Younis	Pakistan	New Zealand	Chris Harris (b); Chris Pringle (b); Richard de Groen (b)	(South Africa) Buffalo Park, East London	19 December 1994	
10.^{[C]}	1,136	Saqlain Mushtaq (1/2)	Pakistan	Zimbabwe	Grant Flower (c †Moin Khan); John Rennie (c †Moin Khan); Andy Whittall (c Saleem Malik)	(Pakistan) Arbab Niaz Stadium, Peshawar	3 November 1996	
11.^{[D]} ^{[H]}	1,158	Eddo Brandes	Zimbabwe	England	Nick Knight (c †Andy Flower); John Crawley (lbw); Nasser Hussain (c †Andy Flower)	(Zimbabwe) Harare Sports Club, Harare	3 January 1997	
12.	1,164	Anthony Stuart	Australia	Pakistan	Ijaz Ahmed (c †Ian Healy); Mohammad Wasim (c †Ian Healy); Moin Khan (c Mark Taylor)	(Australia) Melbourne Cricket Ground, Melbourne	16 January 1997	
13.^{[A]}	1,479	Saqlain Mushtaq (2/2)	Pakistan	Zimbabwe	Henry Olonga (st †Moin Khan); Adam Huckle (st †Moin Khan); Pommie Mbangwa (lbw)	(England) The Oval, London	11 June 1999 ^{W}	
14.^{[E]}	1,776	Chaminda Vaas (1/2)	Sri Lanka	Zimbabwe	Stuart Carlisle (cSuresh Perera); Craig Wishart (lbw); Tatenda Taibu (lbw)	(Sri Lanka) Sinhalese Sports Club Ground, Colombo	8 December 2001	
15.^{[A]}	1,808	Mohammad Sami	Pakistan	West Indies	Ridley Jacobs (lbw); Corey Collymore (b); Cameron Cuffy (b)	(United Arab Emirates) Sharjah Stadium, Sharjah	15 February 2002	
16.^{[C]}^{[D]}^{[F]}	1,950	Chaminda Vaas (2/2)	Sri Lanka	Bangladesh	Hannan Sarkar (b); Mohammad Ashraful (c&b); Ehsanul Haque (c Mahela Jayawardene)	(South Africa) Pietermaritzburg Oval, Pietermaritzburg	14 February 2003^{W}	
17.^{[D]}	1,990	Brett Lee	Australia	Kenya	Kennedy Otieno (b); Brijal Patel (c Ricky Ponting); David Obuya (b)	(South Africa) Kingsmead, Durban	15 March 2003 ^{W}	
18.^{[A]}	2,026	James Anderson	England	Pakistan	Abdul Razzaq (c Marcus Trescothick); Shoaib Akhtar (c †Chris Read); Mohammad Sami (b)	(England) The Oval, London	20 June 2003	
19.^{[A]}	2,164	Steve Harmison	England	India	Mohammad Kaif (c †Geraint Jones); Lakshmipathy Balaji (c Andrew Flintoff); Ashish Nehra (c&b)	(England) Trent Bridge, Nottingham	1 September 2004	
20.^{[A]}	2,243	Charl Langeveldt	South Africa	West Indies	Ian Bradshaw (b); Daren Powell (b); Corey Collymore (lbw)	Kensington Oval, Barbados	11 May 2005	
21.	2,394	Shahadat Hossain	Bangladesh	Zimbabwe	Tafadzwa Mufambisi (c †Khaled Mashud); Elton Chigumbura (lbw); Tawanda Mupariwa (c †Khaled Mashud)	(Zimbabwe) Harare Sports Club, Harare	2 August 2006	
22.	2,432	Jerome Taylor	West Indies	Australia	Michael Hussey (b); Brett Lee (lbw); Brad Hogg (b)	(India) Brabourne Stadium, Mumbai	18 October 2006	
23.	2,474	Shane Bond	New Zealand	Australia	Cameron White (c Craig McMillan); Andrew Symonds (c †Brendon McCullum); Nathan Bracken (b)	(Australia) Bellerive Oval, Hobart	14 January 2007	
24.^{[G]}^{[H]}	2,556	Lasith Malinga (1/3)	Sri Lanka	South Africa	Shaun Pollock (b); Andrew Hall (c Upul Tharanga); Jacques Kallis (c †Kumar Sangakkara); Makhaya Ntini (b)	(Guyana) Providence Stadium, Georgetown	28 March 2007 ^{W}	
25.	2,833	Andrew Flintoff	England	West Indies	Denesh Ramdin (b); Ravi Rampaul (lbw); Sulieman Benn (b)	(Saint Lucia) Beausejour Stadium, Gros Islet	3 April 2009	
26.	2,999	Farveez Maharoof	Sri Lanka	India	Ravindra Jadeja (lbw); Praveen Kumar (b); Zaheer Khan (c †Kumar Sangakkara)	(Sri Lanka) Rangiri Dambulla International Stadium, Dambulla	22 June 2010	
27.^{[H]}	3,073	Abdur Razzak	Bangladesh	Zimbabwe	Prosper Utseya (c Naeem Islam); Ray Price (lbw); Christopher Mpofu (lbw)	(Bangladesh) Sher-e-Bangla National Cricket Stadium, Mirpur	3 December 2010	
28.^{[A]}	3,112	Kemar Roach	West Indies	Netherlands	Pieter Seelaar (lbw); Bernard Loots (lbw); Berend Westdijk (b)	(India) Feroz Shah Kotla, New Delhi	28 February 2011^{W}	
29.^{[H]}	3,113	Lasith Malinga (2/3)	Sri Lanka	Kenya	Tanmay Mishra (lbw); Peter Ongondo (b); Shem Ngoche (b)	(Sri Lanka) R Premadasa Stadium, Colombo	1 March 2011 ^{W}	
30.	3,184	Lasith Malinga (3/3)	Sri Lanka	Australia	Mitchell Johnson (b); John Hastings (lbw); Xavier Doherty (b)	(Sri Lanka) R Premadasa Stadium, Colombo	22 August 2011	
31.	3,253	Dan Christian	Australia	Sri Lanka	Thisara Perera (c Michael Hussey); Sachithra Senanayake (lbw); Nuwan Kulasekara (lbw)	(Australia) Melbourne Cricket Ground, Melbourne	2 March 2012	
32.	3,275	Thisara Perera	Sri Lanka	Pakistan	Younis Khan (c †Kumar Sangakkara); Shahid Afridi (c Dinesh Chandimal); Sarfraz Ahmed (c Mahela Jayawardene)	(Sri Lanka) R. Premadasa Stadium, Colombo	16 June 2012	
33.^{[D]}	3,415	Clint McKay	Australia	England	Kevin Pietersen (lbw); Jonathan Trott (c Aaron Finch); Joe Root (c Shane Watson)	(Wales) Sophia Gardens, Cardiff	14 September 2013	
34.	3,423	Rubel Hossain	Bangladesh	New Zealand	Corey Anderson (b); Brendon McCullum (c Shamsur Rahman (sub)); Jimmy Neesham (c †Mushfiqur Rahim)	(Bangladesh) Sher-e-Bangla National Cricket Stadium, Mirpur	29 October 2013	
35.	3,518	Prosper Utseya	Zimbabwe	South Africa	Quinton de Kock (c Tendai Chatara); Rilee Rossouw (c John Nyumbu); David Miller (lbw)	(Zimbabwe) Harare Sports Club, Harare	29 August 2014	
36.^{[H]}^{[I]}	3,559	Taijul Islam	Bangladesh	Zimbabwe	Tinashe Panyangara (b); John Nyumbu (lbw); Tendai Chatara (b)	(Bangladesh) Sher-e-Bangla National Cricket Stadium, Mirpur	1 December 2014 ^{D}	
37.^{[A]}	3,600	Steven Finn	England	Australia	Brad Haddin (c Stuart Broad); Glenn Maxwell (c Joe Root); Mitchell Johnson (c James Anderson)	(Australia) Melbourne Cricket Ground, Melbourne	14 February 2015^{W}	
38.^{[H]}	3,640	JP Duminy	South Africa	Sri Lanka	Angelo Mathews (c Faf du Plessis); Nuwan Kulasekara (c Quinton de Kock); Tharindu Kaushal (lbw)	(Australia) Sydney Cricket Ground, Sydney	18 March 2015 ^{W}	
39.^{[I]}	3,663	Kagiso Rabada	South Africa	Bangladesh	Tamim Iqbal (b); Litton Das (c Farhaan Behardien); Mahmudullah Riyad (lbw)	(Bangladesh) Sher-e-Bangla National Cricket Stadium, Mirpur	10 July 2015 ^{D}	
40.^{[H]}	3,769	James Faulkner	Australia	Sri Lanka	Kusal Perera (lbw); Angelo Mathews (c Moises Henriques); Thisara Perera (b)	(Sri Lanka) Premadasa Stadium, Colombo	24 August 2016	
41.^{[A]}	3,856	Taskin Ahmed	Bangladesh	Sri Lanka	Asela Gunaratne (c Soumya Sarkar); Suranga Lakmal (c Mustafizur Rahman); Nuwan Pradeep (b)	(Sri Lanka) Rangiri Dambulla International Stadium, Dambulla	28 March 2017	
42.^{[A]}^{[I]}	3,899	Wanindu Hasaranga	Sri Lanka	Zimbabwe	Malcolm Waller (b); Donald Tiripano (lbw); Tendai Chatara (b)	(Sri Lanka) Galle International Stadium, Galle	2 July 2017 ^{D}	
43.	3,912	Kuldeep Yadav (1/2)	India	Australia	Matthew Wade (b); Ashton Agar (lbw); Pat Cummins (c MS Dhoni)	(India) Eden Gardens, Kolkata	21 September 2017	
44.^{[A]}^{[H]}^{[I]}	3,967	Shehan Madushanka	Sri Lanka	Bangladesh	Mashrafe Mortaza (c Kusal Mendis); Rubel Hossain (b); Mahmudullah (c Upul Tharanga)	(Bangladesh) Sher-e-Bangla National Cricket Stadium, Mirpur	27 January 2018 ^{D}	
45.^{[H]}	4,050	Imran Tahir	South Africa	Zimbabwe	Sean Williams (st Heinrich Klaasen); Peter Moor (lbw); Brandon Mavuta (b)	(South Africa) Mangaung Oval, Bloemfontein	3 October 2018	
46.	4,066	Trent Boult (1/2)	New Zealand	Pakistan	Fakhar Zaman (b); Babar Azam (c Ross Taylor); Mohammad Hafeez (lbw)	(United Arab Emirates) Sheikh Zayed Cricket Stadium, Abu Dhabi	7 November 2018	
47.^{[A]}	4,169	Mohammed Shami	India	Afghanistan	Mohammad Nabi (c Hardik Pandya); Aftab Alam (b); Mujeeb Ur Rahman (b)	(England) The Rose Bowl, Southampton	22 June 2019 ^{W}	
48.^{[A]}	4,178	Trent Boult (2/2)	New Zealand	Australia	Usman Khawaja (b); Mitchell Starc (b); Jason Behrendorff (lbw)	(England) Lord's Cricket Ground, London	29 June 2019 ^{W}	
49.	4,222	Kuldeep Yadav (2/2)	India	West Indies	Shai Hope (c Virat Kohli); Jason Holder (st Rishabh Pant); Alzarri Joseph (c Kedar Jadhav)	(India) ACA–VDCA Cricket Stadium, Visakhapatnam	18 December 2019	
50.	4,546	Wessly Madhevere	Zimbabwe	Netherlands	Colin Ackermann (st Clive Madande); Teja Nidamanuru (b); Paul van Meekeren (b)	(Zimbabwe) Harare Sports Club, Harare	23 March 2023	
51.^{[H]}	4,823	Maheesh Theekshana	Sri Lanka	New Zealand	Mitchell Santner (c Chamindu Wickramasinghe); Nathan Smith (c Kamindu Mendis); Matt Henry (c Nuwanidu Fernando)	(New Zealand) Seddon Park, Hamilton	8 January 2025	
52.	4,899	Dilshan Madushanka	Sri Lanka	Zimbabwe	Sikandar Raza (b); Brad Evans (c Asitha Fernando); Richard Ngarava (b)	(Zimbabwe) Harare Sports Club, Harare	29 August 2025	

== By team ==
ODI hat-tricks by team
Team	Hat-tricks	No. of bowlers
Sri Lanka	11	8
Pakistan	8	6
Australia	6	6
Bangladesh	5	5
India	5	4
England	4	4
South Africa	4	4
New Zealand	4	3
Zimbabwe	3	3
West Indies	2	2
Total	52	45

== By bowler ==
Bowlers with multiple ODI hat-tricks
Bowler	Hat-tricks
(Sri Lanka) Lasith Malinga	3
(India) Kuldeep Yadav	2
(Sri Lanka) Chaminda Vaas	2
(New Zealand) Trent Boult	2
(Pakistan) Wasim Akram	2
(Pakistan) Saqlain Mushtaq	2

== By type of bowling ==
ODI hat-tricks by type of bowling
Bowling type	Hat-tricks	Sub-type	Hat-tricks	Bowlers
Fast bowling	40	Right-arm fast	31	Jalal-ud-Din, Chetan Sharma, Kapil Dev, Aaqib Javed, Danny Morrison, Waqar Younis, Eddo Brandes, Anthony Stuart, Mohammad Sami, Brett Lee, James Anderson, Steve Harmison, Charl Langeveldt, Shahadat Hossain, Jerome Taylor, Shane Bond, Lasith Malinga (3), Andrew Flintoff, Farveez Maharoof, Kemar Roach, Dan Christian, Thisara Perera, Clint McKay, Rubel Hossain, Steven Finn, Kagiso Rabada, Taskin Ahmed, Shehan Madushanka, Mohammed Shami
Fast bowling	40	Left-arm fast	9	Bruce Reid, Wasim Akram (2), Chaminda Vaas (2), James Faulkner, Trent Boult (2), Dilshan Madushanka
Spin bowling	12	Off spin	6	Saqlain Mushtaq (2), Prosper Utseya, JP Duminy, Wessly Madhevere, Maheesh Theekshana
Spin bowling	12	Leg spin	2	Wanindu Hasaranga, Imran Tahir
Spin bowling	12	Left-arm orthodox spin	2	Abdur Razzak, Taijul Islam
Spin bowling	12	Left-arm unorthodox spin	2	Kuldeep Yadav (2)
Total	52		52	

== By ground ==
Grounds involved in multiple ODI hat-tricks
Ground	Hat-tricks
(Bangladesh) Sher-e-Bangla National Stadium, Mirpur	5
(Zimbabwe) Harare Sports Club, Harare	5
(Sri Lanka) R. Premadasa Stadium, Colombo	4
(United Arab Emirates) Sharjah Cricket Stadium, Sharjah	4
(Australia) Melbourne Cricket Ground, Melbourne	3
(India) Eden Gardens, Kolkata	2
(Australia) Sydney Cricket Ground, Sydney	2
(England) The Oval, London	2
(Sri Lanka) Dambulla Cricket Stadium, Dambulla	2

== See also ==
- List of Test cricket hat-tricks
- List of Twenty20 International cricket hat-tricks
- List of women's international cricket hat-tricks

== Notes ==
A. ^{1} ^{2} ^{3} ^{4} ^{5} ^{6} ^{7} ^{8} ^{9} ^{10} ^{11} Last three wickets of the innings

B. ^{1} Aaqib Javed ended with 7–37, then the best bowling figures in an ODI.

C. ^{1} ^{2} Four wickets in five deliveries

D. ^{1} ^{2} ^{3} ^{4} First three wickets of the innings

E. ^{1} Vaas took 8–19; this is the only time (as of 25 July 2021) that a bowler has taken eight wickets in an ODI.

F. ^{1} First three deliveries of the match

G. ^{1} Four wickets in four deliveries

H. ^{1} ^{2} ^{3} ^{4} ^{5} Hat-trick spanned two overs

I. ^{1} ^{2} ^{3} ^{4} Hat-trick on debut
