= Sri Lankan cricket team in Bangladesh in 2017–18 =

International cricket tour

	Bangladesh	Sri Lanka
- Dates: 31 January – 18 February 2018
Captains	Mahmudullah	Dinesh Chandimal

Test series
- Result: Sri Lanka won the 2-match series 1–0
Most runs	Mominul Haque (314)	Kusal Mendis (271)
Most wickets	Taijul Islam (12)	Rangana Herath (9)
- Player of the series: Roshen Silva (SL)

Twenty20 International series
- Results: Sri Lanka won the 2-match series 2–0
Most runs	Mahmudullah (84)	Kusal Mendis (123)
Most wickets	Nazmul Islam (2)	Danushka Gunathilaka (3); Jeevan Mendis (3)
- Player of the series: Kusal Mendis (SL)

The Sri Lanka cricket team toured Bangladesh in January and February 2018 to play two Tests and two Twenty20 International (T20I) matches. Prior to the tour, both teams played in ab ODI tri-series, along with Zimbabwe.

In December 2017, Shakib Al Hasan was named the new captain of Bangladesh's Test squad, replacing Mushfiqur Rahim. However, ahead of the Test series, Shakib suffered a hand injury during the final of the 2017–18 Bangladesh Tri-Nation Series, and Mahmudullah was named as captain of Bangladesh for the first Test. It was Mahmudullah's first Test as captain and he became the tenth player to lead Bangladesh in Tests. Mahmudullah also captained Bangladesh for the second Test, as Shakib was still recovering from his injury. Sri Lanka won the Test series 1–0, after the first match was drawn.

Shakib Al Hasan was also ruled out of the T20I series, and Mahmudullah again captained the side. Sri Lanka won the T20I series 2–0.

== Squads ==
Tests		T20Is	
Bangladesh	Sri Lanka	Bangladesh	Sri Lanka
~~Shakib Al Hasan~~ (c); Mahmudullah (c); Litton Das (wk); Mominul Haque; Nayeem Hasan; Mehedi Hasan; Tanbir Hayder; Mosaddek Hossain; Rubel Hossain; Tamim Iqbal; Kamrul Islam Rabbi; Sunzamul Islam; Taijul Islam; Imrul Kayes; Mushfiqur Rahim; Mustafizur Rahman; Sabbir Rahman; Abdur Razzak	Dinesh Chandimal (c); Suranga Lakmal (vc); Dushmantha Chameera; Akila Dananjaya; Dhananjaya de Silva; Niroshan Dickwella (wk); Lahiru Gamage; Danushka Gunathilaka; Rangana Herath; Dimuth Karunaratne; Lahiru Kumara; Kusal Mendis; ~~Angelo Mathews~~; Dilruwan Perera; Lakshan Sandakan; Roshen Silva	~~Shakib Al Hasan~~ (c); Mahmudullah (c); Ariful Haque; Mahedi Hasan; Zakir Hasan; Abu Hider; Afif Hossain; Nazmul Islam; Rubel Hossain; Tamim Iqbal; Abu Jayed; Mohammad Mithun; Mushfiqur Rahim; Mustafizur Rahman; Sabbir Rahman; Mohammad Saifuddin; Soumya Sarkar	Dinesh Chandimal (c); Amila Aponso; Akila Dananjaya; Niroshan Dickwella; Asitha Fernando; ~~Asela Gunaratne~~; Danushka Gunathilaka; Shehan Madushanka; Jeevan Mendis; Kusal Mendis; ~~Kusal Perera~~; Thisara Perera; Dasun Shanaka; Upul Tharanga; Isuru Udana; Jeffrey Vandersay

Sunzamul Islam and Tanbir Hayder were added to Bangladesh's squad for the first Test following the news of Shakib Al Hasan's injury. Abdur Razzak was also added to Bangladesh's Test squad as cover for Shakib Al Hasan. Sri Lanka's Angelo Mathews missed the first Test due to injury and was later ruled out of the rest of the tour. Sabbir Rahman was added to Bangladesh's squad ahead of the second Test, with Sunzamul Islam and Rubel Hossain both being dropped.

Ahead of the T20I series, Shakib Al Hasan's finger injury had not yet healed and he said he would be unlikely to play in the matches, despite being named as the captain of Bangladesh's T20I squad. Shakib was ruled out of the first T20I due to his injury and Nazmul Islam was added to Bangladesh's squad as his replacement. Mohammad Mithun was added to Bangladesh's squad as cover for Tamim Iqbal and Mushfiqur Rahim.

Kusal Perera was ruled out of Sri Lanka's T20I squad due to injury and was replaced by Kusal Mendis. Asela Gunaratne was also ruled out of Sri Lanka's T20I squad due to injury.

== Test series ==
=== 1st Test ===
31 January–4 February 2018
Scorecard

Bangladesh	v	Sri Lanka
513 (129.5 overs); Mominul Haque 176 (214); Suranga Lakmal 3/68 (23.5 overs)		713/9d (199.3 overs); Kusal Mendis 196 (327); Taijul Islam 4/219 (67.3 overs)
307/5 (100 overs); Mominul Haque 105 (174); Rangana Herath 2/80 (28 overs)

Match drawn
Zohur Ahmed Chowdhury Stadium, Chittagong
Umpires: Marais Erasmus (SA) and Rod Tucker (Aus)
Player of the match: Mominul Haque (Ban)

- Bangladesh won the toss and elected to bat.
- Sunzamul Islam (Ban) made his Test debut.
- Mahmudullah captained Bangladesh for the first time in Tests and scored 2,000 runs in Tests.
- Mominul Haque scored the second-fastest century by a Bangladesh batsman in Tests (96 balls) and became the fastest Bangladesh batsman to score 2,000 runs in Tests. He also became first Bangladesh batsman to score centuries in both innings of a Test.
- Bangladesh scored their second-highest number of runs in one day of a Test (374).
- Dhananjaya de Silva became the joint-fastest batsman to reach 1,000 Test runs for Sri Lanka along with Roy Dias and Michael Vandort (23 innings).
- Roshen Silva (SL) scored his first century in Tests.
- Sri Lanka's score of 713/9d is their joint fifth-highest total in Tests.

=== 2nd Test ===
8–12 February 2018 (Note: While five days of play were scheduled for each Test, the second Test reached a result within three days.)
Scorecard

Sri Lanka	v	Bangladesh
222 (65.3 overs); Kusal Mendis 68 (98); Abdur Razzak 4/63 (16 overs)		110 (45.4 overs); Mehedi Hasan 38* (78); Akila Dananjaya 3/20 (10 overs)
226 (73.5 overs); Roshen Silva 70* (145); Taijul Islam 4/76 (19.5 overs)		123 (29.3 overs); Mominul Haque 33 (47); Akila Dananjaya 5/24 (5 overs)

Sri Lanka won by 215 runs
Sher-e-Bangla National Cricket Stadium, Dhaka
Umpires: Rod Tucker (Aus) and Joel Wilson (WI)
Player of the match: Roshen Silva (SL)

- Sri Lanka won the toss and elected to bat.
- Akila Dananjaya (SL) made his Test debut and became the third bowler for Sri Lanka to take a five-wicket haul on Test debut.
- Suranga Lakmal (SL) took his 100th wicket in Tests.
- Rangana Herath (SL) became the most successful left-arm bowler in Tests when he took his 415th wicket, going past Wasim Akram's (Pak) total of 414 wickets.

== T20I series ==
=== 1st T20I ===
15 February 2018
17:00 (N)
Scorecard

Bangladesh; 193/5 (20 overs)	v	Sri Lanka; 194/4 (16.4 overs)
Mushfiqur Rahim 66* (44); Jeevan Mendis 2/21 (3 overs)		Kusal Mendis 53 (27); Nazmul Islam 2/25 (4 overs)

Sri Lanka won by 6 wickets
Sher-e-Bangla National Cricket Stadium, Dhaka
Umpires: Anisur Rahman (Ban) and Sharfuddoula (Ban)
Player of the match: Kusal Mendis (SL)

- Bangladesh won the toss and elected to bat.
- Ariful Haque, Zakir Hasan, Afif Hossain, Nazmul Islam (Ban) and Shehan Madushanka (SL) all made their T20I debuts.
- Mahmudullah captained Bangladesh for the first time in T20Is.
- This was Bangladesh's highest total in T20Is.
- This was Sri Lanka's highest successful run-chase in T20Is.

=== 2nd T20I ===
18 February 2018
17:00 (N)
Scorecard

Sri Lanka; 210/4 (20 overs)	v	Bangladesh; 135 (18.4 overs)
Kusal Mendis 70 (42); Soumya Sarkar 1/25 (2 overs)		Mahmudullah 41 (31); Shehan Madushanka 2/23 (2.1 overs)

Sri Lanka won by 75 runs
Sylhet International Cricket Stadium, Sylhet
Umpires: Masudur Rahman (Ban) and Sharfuddoula (Ban)
Player of the match: Kusal Mendis (SL)

- Bangladesh won the toss and elected to field.
- Mahedi Hasan, Abu Jayed (Ban) and Amila Aponso (SL) all made their T20I debuts.
