= Abdur Razzak (cricketer) =

Bangladeshi cricketer

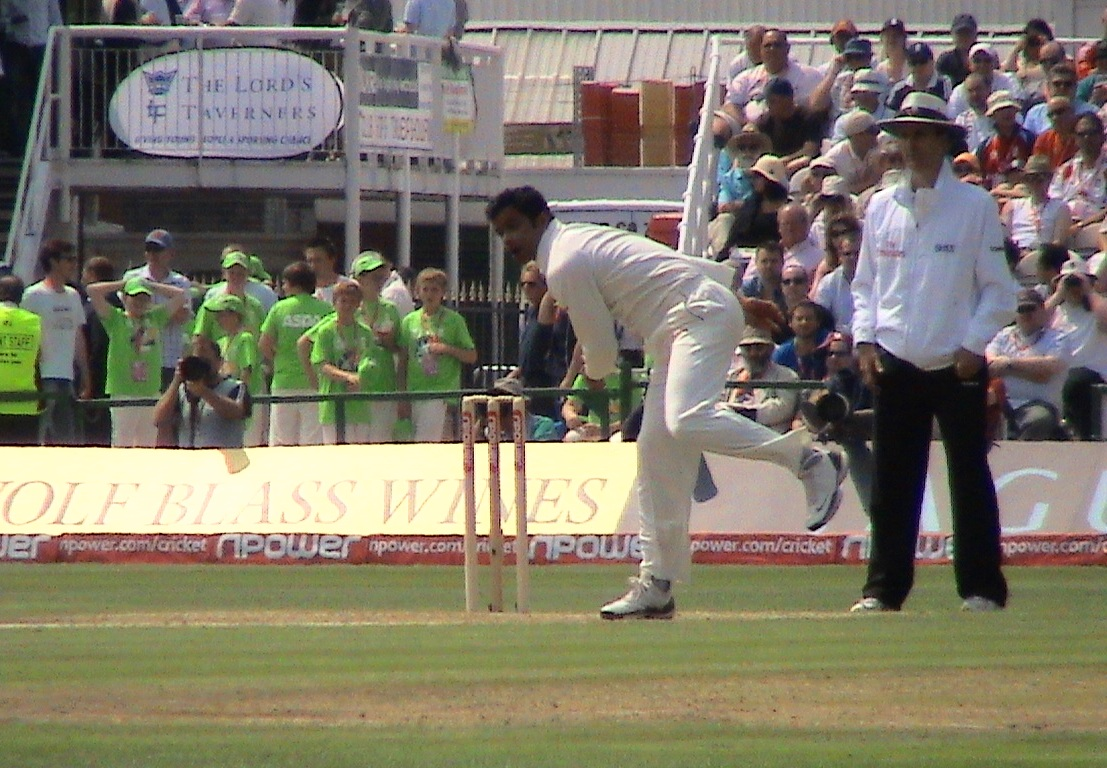

Personal information
- Full name: Abdur Razzak
- Born: 15 June 1982 (age 44); Khulna, Bangladesh
- Nickname: Raj
- Batting: Left-handed
- Bowling: Slow left-arm orthodox
- Role: Bowler

International information
- National side: Bangladesh (2004–2018)
- Test debut (cap 45): 16 April 2006 v Australia
- Last Test: 8 February 2018 v Sri Lanka
- ODI debut (cap 73): 16 July 2004 v Hong Kong
- Last ODI: 25 August 2014 v West Indies
- ODI shirt no.: 41
- T20I debut (cap 1): 28 November 2006 v Zimbabwe
- Last T20I: 27 August 2014 v West Indies
- T20I shirt no.: 41

Domestic team information
- Years: Team
- 2001–present: Khulna Division
- 2008: Royal Challengers Bangalore
- 2012: Khulna Royal Bengals
- 2013: Rangpur Riders
- 2015: Sylhet Super Stars
- 2016: Chittagong Vikings

Career statistics
Competition	Test	ODI	T20I	FC
Matches	13	153	34	137
Runs scored	245	779	41	2,817
Batting average	17.50	13.43	4.10	16.96
100s/50s	0/0	0/1	0/0	0/10
Top score	43	53*	9	97
Balls bowled	2,817	7,965	730	37,205
Wickets	28	207	44	634
Bowling average	59.75	29.29	19.04	28.52
5 wickets in innings	0	4	0	41
10 wickets in match	0	0	0	11
Best bowling	4/63	5/29	4/16	9/84
Catches/stumpings	4/–	32/–	10/–	52/–
Medal record
Men's Cricket
Representing Bangladesh
ACC Asia Cup
Runner-up	2012 Bangladesh
- Source: ESPNcricinfo, 12 March 2023

Khan Abdur Razzak (Bengali: খান আব্দুর রাজ্জাক; born 15 June 1982) is a Bangladeshi former cricketer who played for the national team in all formats of the game. Abdur Razzak is the first Bangladeshi to take 200 wickets in ODIs. He is also the first left-arm spinner and second spinner after Saqlain Mushtaq to take a hat-trick. In 2025 he was elected as a director of Bangladesh Cricket Board.

He made his first-class debut at Bangladeshi domestic level for Khulna Division in the 2001/02 season. Best known for being a tall left-arm orthodox spin bowler, he helped guide his division to the National Cricket title in his maiden season. From there he was selected for Bangladesh A (training team for the full national squad) performing well against Zimbabwe A, including claiming 7 wickets for 17 runs in one game in Dhaka.

He played just nine Tests. He was more successful in One Day Internationals (ODIs) and was Bangladesh's leading wicket-taker in the format in 2013, when he reached the 200 wickets milestone.

In January 2018, he became the first Bangladesh player to take 500 wickets in first-class cricket. After an absence of four years, he made a comeback to the Test squad on 8 February 2018 against Sri Lanka, taking 4-63 opening the bowling, but Bangladesh lost the match by 215 runs. In November 2019, he took his 600th first-class wicket, becoming the first Bangladeshi bowler to reach the milestone.

In February 2021, Abdur Razzak announced his retirement from all forms of cricket.

== Domestic career ==
=== Indian Premier League ===
Abdur Razzak was the only Bangladeshi to play in the 2008 Indian Premier League making him the first Bangladeshi to play the league. He was bought for $50,000 by the Royal Challengers Bangalore and played in only one match. Despite not playing often for the team, Abdur Razzak believed that the experience he gained from the tournament was important. He stated that Anil Kumble "was very helpful when I asked him about bowling in Test matches. He told me that given my bowling approach, it is very important to use variations within my line and length. Actually, captains would want a breakthrough from me so without using variations, wickets are hard to come by. Coach Venkatesh Prasad was also a great help".

=== Bangladesh domestic career ===
Abdur Razzak responded by taking his best bowling figures in first-class cricket (8/123). His match haul of 15/193 against Barisal Division were the best in the history of the National Cricket League, breaking the record set three years previously by Elias Sunny, the bowler who had replaced Abdur Razzak in the Test team.

In April 2018, he was the leading wicket-taker in the 2017–18 Bangladesh Cricket League, with 43 dismissals in six matches, a record for the tournament. He was also the leading wicket-taker in the 2018–19 Bangladesh Cricket League, with 34 dismissals in six matches.

He was the leading wicket-taker for Prime Bank Cricket Club in the 2018–19 Dhaka Premier Division Cricket League tournament, with 19 dismissals in 16 matches. He was the leading wicket-taker in the 2019–20 National Cricket League, with 31 dismissals in five matches.

== International career ==
=== Debut years ===
Abdur Razzak was called into the Bangladesh national team for the 2004 Asia Cup One Day International tournament, making his debut against Hong Kong in July. He established himself as a regular fixture in the squad although he was not a regular in the starting eleven. He made his Test debut in the second Test of the Australian tour of Bangladesh in April 2006.

After impressing in one-day cricket, he was called up for his Test debut at home to Australia at the Chittagong Divisional Stadium. Bangladesh batted first and he recorded 15 in his first Test match innings. A decent start but he failed to take a wicket in Australia's only innings and he registered a golden duck in an innings defeat. His next test appearance took place a year afterwards against Sri Lanka where he got first test wicket having Chamara Silva caught. He got Graeme Smith in a Test against South Africa and he got his highest Test match score of 33 in both innings, once finishing unbeaten. In a Test match against New Zealand, he registered his highest Test match bowling figures of 3–93. This and the next Test in the series (subsequently his last so far) brought his bowling action into question.

=== Suspension ===
Following New Zealand's tour of Bangladesh in October 2008, Abdur Razzak was reported by umpires Daryl Harper and Asoka de Silva for having a "suspect bowling action". This was the second time in his career that he had been reported for his bowling action. A bowler is deemed to have thrown the ball if his arm bends by more than 15 degrees when delivering the ball. It had been expected that only Abdur Razzak's quicker ball was suspect and he would be disallowed from bowling it, however tests showed that Abdur Razzak bends his arm by 22–28 degrees, usually averaging 25 degrees although his quicker ball was delivered at an average of 24 degrees. As a result, Abdur Razzak was suspended from international cricket, although he is allowed to bowl under supervision in domestic cricket, until he remodels his action. In March 2009, the ICC lifted Abdur Razzak's suspension after he changed his bowling action; now both his stock delivery and faster ball are legal.

=== Return after suspension ===
In July 2009, on Bangladesh's tour of the West Indies, Abdur Razzak represented Bangladesh in international cricket for the first time since his suspension. Omitted from the Test squad, he was called up for the one-day series. Abdur Razzak's performance in the first One Day International, for which he was awarded the man-of-the-match award, helped Bangladesh defeat the West Indies by 52 runs. He opened the bowling and took 4 wickets for 39 runs (4/39) against a West Indies team weakened by disputes between the players and the West Indies Cricket Board. He finished as Bangladesh's leading wicket-taker in the three match series, with 7 wickets at 22.85, however he was injured in the final match. The hamstring strain he sustained while batting ruled him out of Bangladesh's tour of Zimbabwe in August 2009. By the time Zimbabwe toured Bangladesh for a five-match ODI series in October and November 2009, Abdur Razzak had recovered from his injury and was included in the Bangladesh squad. He took 15 wickets in the series which Bangladesh won 4–1 and was named Man of the Series.

=== Late career ===
At the start of November 2010, the BCB announced 16 central contracts. Abdur Razzak was one of six players in the top level. He was included in Bangladesh's 15-man squad for the 2011 World Cup. Zimbabwe returned to Test cricket in August 2011 with a one-off match against Bangladesh. Bangladesh lost the match, their first Test since touring England in June the previous year, with Abdur Razzak taking two wickets for 106 runs. In the subsequent five-match ODI series, Abdur Razzak was the least successful of the bowlers to deliver 20 overs or more taking two wickets in four matches as Bangladesh lost the series 3–2. When the West Indies toured in October he went wicketless in the ODI series and was subsequently dropped from the Test squad, which led him to consider the international retirement in 2014.

On 28 March 2013 he took 5 wickets against Sri Lanka in the 3rd ODI and became the 1st Bangladeshi bowler who took 200 wickets in ODI. On 5 May 2013, at the 2nd ODI between Zimbabwe in Bulawayo, he scored his maiden half-century with 53* runs. At the same time, he achieved quickest half-century in cricket history of Bangladesh. But his team was defeated by 6 wickets. He is the first left arm spinner and 2nd spinner after Saqlain Mushtaq took a Hat-trick.

However, his milestone in first-class cricket to become the first Bangladeshi to take 500 wickets, he was added to the Bangladeshi Test squad as a cover for injured Shakib Al Hasan. He made his comeback match against Sri Lanka on 8 February 2018 and took 4 wickets to bowl out Sri Lanka for 222 in their first innings.

== Post-retirement ==
In March 2020 Razzak was offered a position in the Bangladesh national selection panel however the COVID-19 pandemic delayed his appointment to the role until January 2021. He stated he would make a decision on whether to continue playing domestic cricket after his appointment was announced. On 13 February 2021, Abdur Razzak along with Shahriar Nafees announced their retirement from all forms of cricket.
