= Nidahas Trophy =

International cricket tournament held in Sri Lanka

- Administrator: Sri Lanka Cricket (SLC)
- Format: ODI, T20I
- First edition: 1998
- Latest edition: 2018
- Tournament format: Double round-robin and Final
- Number of teams: India; Sri Lanka; New Zealand; Bangladesh
- Host: Sri Lanka
- Current champion: India (2nd title)
- Most successful: India (2 titles)
- Most runs: (India) Sachin Tendulkar (263) (ODI) (Sri Lanka) Kusal Perera (204) (T20I)
- Most wickets: (India) Ajit Agarkar (12) (ODI) (India) Washington Sundar, Yuzvendra Chahal (8) (T20I)

Nidahas Trophy is an international cricket tournament held in Sri Lanka. The tournament is held to celebrate the independence of the Asian island country Sri Lanka. The tournament is not a regular event in the calendar with the previous tournaments having a gap of 20 years in between. Each of the three participating teams play each other twice and the top two progress to the final. In March 2017 Sri Lanka Cricket announced that the 2018 tournament would be played in the newer and shorter T20I format with Bangladesh entering the tournament, replacing the only Non-Asian team in the triple-nation New Zealand.

== Tournament history ==
Both the tournaments have been won by India, defeating Sri Lanka in the final of the 1998 tournament and Bangladesh in the final of the 2018 tournament.

Year	Format	Host(s)	Final venue	Result		
Year	Format	Host(s)	Final venue	Winner	Margin	Runner-up
1998	ODI	Sri Lanka	Colombo	India; 307/6 (50 overs)	India won by 6 runs Scorecard	Sri Lanka; 301 all out (49.3 overs)
2018	T20I	Sri Lanka	Colombo	India; 168/6 (20 overs)	India won by 4 wickets Scorecard	Bangladesh; 166/8 (20 overs)

== Results summary ==
The table below provides an overview of the performances of teams over past Nidahas Trophy tournaments.

Team	Appearances			Best result	Statistics					
Team	Total	First	Latest	Best result	Played	Won	Lost	Tie	NR	Win%
India	2	1998	2018	Champions (1998, 2018)	12	6	2	0	4	66.67%
Sri Lanka	2	1998	2018	Runners-up (1998)	11	4	5	0	2	45.45%
Bangladesh	1	2018	2018	Runners-up (2018)	5	2	3	0	0	40.00%
New Zealand	1	1998	1998	Group Stage (1998)	6	0	2	0	4	33.33%

== Teams Performances ==
Team \ Host	1998 (3)	2018 (3)
Team \ Host	(Sri Lanka)	(Sri Lanka)
Bangladesh	—	2nd
India	1st	1st
New Zealand	Group Stage	—
Sri Lanka	2nd	Group Stage

== Debut of teams ==
Year	Debutants	Total
1998	India, New Zealand, Sri Lanka	3
2018	Bangladesh	1
