= December 2005 in sports =

<<	December 2005					>>
Su	Mo	Tu	We	Th	Fr	Sa
				1	2	3
4	5	6	7	8	9	10
11	12	13	14	15	16	17
18	19	20	21	22	23	24
25	26	27	28	29	30	31
Sports

This list shows notable sports-related deaths, events, and notable outcomes that occurred in December of 2005.

== Deaths ==
- 23: Lajos Baróti
- 21: Elrod Hendricks
- 16: Sverre Stenersen
- 15: Darrell Russell
- 7: Bud Carson
- 6: Charly Gaul

== Ongoing events ==
- Cricket tours:
  - South Africa in Australia; Sri Lanka in New Zealand
- Winter sports:
  - Ice hockey
    - 2006 World Juniors
  - Ski jumping
    - 29 December–6 January: Four Hills Tournament
      in Germany and Austria
- Cricket 2005–06: Australia; West Indies
- Football (soccer) 2005–06:
  - England: Premier League; England (general)
  - Scotland
  - Denmark: Superliga
  - France: Ligue 1;
  - UEFA Champions League; UEFA Cup
  - Argentina
  - Australia: Hyundai A-League
- Rugby union 2005–06: Heineken Cup
- U.S. and Canadian sports 2005(−06):
  - NFL; NHL; NBA; College Football Bowls

== 31 December 2005 (Saturday) ==
- NFL Week 17
  - Denver Broncos 23, San Diego Chargers 7: Tatum Bell scored three touchdowns for the Broncos, but could muster only 52 yards, leaving him short of a 1,000 yard season, missing out on joining teammate Mike Anderson.
  - New York Giants 30, Oakland Raiders 21: Tiki Barber had a 95-yard touchdown run, the longest in Giant history; Plaxico Burress caught a 78-yard touchdown pass from Eli Manning; and the Giants won the NFC East title, ending the four-year reign of the Philadelphia Eagles, and also clinched a playoff berth for the Tampa Bay Buccaneers in the process.
- NCAA College Football
  - Meineke Car Care Bowl: NC State 14, South Florida 0: The ACC's Wolfpack shuts out the Big East's Bulls for the first time since the USF program began in 1997.
  - AutoZone Liberty Bowl: Tulsa 31, Fresno State 24: Golden Hurricane QB Paul Smith scored the winning touchdown for the C-USA champions over the WAC Bulldogs.
  - EV1.net Houston Bowl: TCU 27, Iowa State 24: Peter LoCoco's 44-yard field goal was the margin of victory for the MWC Champion Horned Frogs in their win over the Cyclones, who were the Big 12 representatives. On January 3, 2006, three days after their triumph in Houston, TCU's freshman kicker, Kasey Davis, is found shot to death in the parking lot of an apartment complex.
- NCAA College Basketball
  - (21) Ohio State 78, LSU 76: In, what is called by same, the best comeback of the year thus far, the Buckeyes keeps their perfect record intact going to 10–0. The disappointing loss for the Tigers sends them to 7–4. The winning shot was taken by Matt Sylvester, who also made the shot in March of last year that ended Illinois' bid for a perfect season. Ohio State trailed by 15 points with just over 5½ minutes left and was down by 10 with 2½ minutes to go, but managed to come back and get the win. They are one of eight undefeated teams left.
  - Arizona 96, (7) Washington 95 (2 OT): Unranked traditional powerhouse Arizona pulls off a gutsy win in a Pac-10 thriller that lasted 50 minutes, two overtimes. With 5.1 seconds to go Kirk Walters made a free throw to give Arizona the lead. It ended Washington's best start to a season since 1975 and also ended the longest current home-winning streak, at 32 games. The new leader is Gonzaga at 30. Washington is another undefeated team to fall, as they go to 11–1. Arizona improves to 9–3, and 2–0 in the Pac-10.
  - (14) Oklahoma 68, Alabama 56: The Crimson Tide lose yet another chance to beat a ranked team as they fall to the Sooners and Kevin Bookout's 18 points and 8 rebounds. They were bouncing back from an upset loss to West Virginia the previous week, and now move to 8–2, likely holding on to their top 15 spot, if not moving up. Alabama's season has been disappointing, as they now move to 6–5.
  - (1) Duke 102, UNC-Greensboro 69
  - (10) Louisville 58, Miami (FL) 43
  - California 68, (11) UCLA 61
  - (3) Villanova 75, Temple 53
  - (8) Gonzaga 102, St. Joseph's 94
  - Pittsburgh 73, (24) Wisconsin 64

== 30 December 2005 (Friday) ==
- NFL
  - The league and the New Orleans Saints announced that the franchise will return to the state of Louisiana for the 2006 NFL Season.
  - Tony Dungy will return to coach the Indianapolis Colts on Sunday (January 1, 2006) against the Arizona Cardinals a week after his son's death.
- NCAA College Football
  - Gaylord Hotels Music City Bowl presented by Bridgestone: Virginia 34, Minnesota 31: The ACC Cavaliers, the replacement for the SEC who didn't field enough teams who had six wins, needed a 39-yard field goal by Connor Hughes with 1:08 left to beat the Big Ten's Golden Gophers at The Coliseum in Nashville.
  - Vitalis Sun Bowl: UCLA 50, Northwestern 38: In the sole Big Ten-Pac 10 matchup this bowl season, the Bruins defeated the Wildcats thanks to two on-side kick returns for touchdowns by Brandon Breazell and three touchdown passes by Drew Olson after he had a bad first quarter, throwing three interceptions, two of which were returned for touchdowns in an anomaly, considering that Olson threw a total of three pickoffs in the regular season.
  - Independence Bowl: Missouri 38, South Carolina 31: The Big 12 Tigers roared back from a 28–7 deficit thanks to four Brad Smith touchdowns to beat the SEC Gamecocks in Shreveport, Louisiana.
  - Chick-fil-A Peach Bowl: LSU 40, Miami (FL) 3: The ACC's Hurricanes scored the first three points, but the SEC's Bayou Bengals scored the final forty points thanks to 282 yards rushing in the last game using the "Peach Bowl" name, as beginning next year, the game becomes the "Chick-fil-A Bowl." The post-game was marred by a fight between players from both sides.
- Cricket
  - South Africa in Australia: At Melbourne Cricket Ground, Australia (355 & 321–7d) completed their 184-run victory in the second Test against South Africa (311 & 181) just after lunch. (Cricinfo)

== 29 December 2005 (Thursday) ==
- NHL: Wayne Gretzky returned behind the bench for the Phoenix Coyotes, and the team responded as they defeated the Los Angeles Kings, 6–5 in overtime.
- NCAA College Football
  - Emerald Bowl: Utah 38, Georgia Tech 10: The MWC Utes, who shocked the world last year as an entry into the Bowl Championship Series, defeated an outmanned ACC Yellow Jackets squad thanks to Brett Ratliff's 30-for-41 performance for 381 yards and four touchdowns, all caught by wideout Travis LaTendresse. Quinton Genther added 120 rushing yards.
  - Pacific Life Holiday Bowl: Oklahoma 17, Oregon 14: The Sooners stunned the sixth-ranked Ducks in a typical Holiday Bowl finish, with Cliff Ingram intercepting Brady Leaf's pass deep in Sooner territory. It's the second straight year a high-ranked Pac-10 team was shocked by a Big 12 school.
- Ski jumping:
  - Four Hills Tournament: In the first meet of the one-week tournament, defending champion Janne Ahonen wins after jumps of 130.5 and 130 metres, gaining a total of 270.9 points. Norway's Roar Ljøkelsøy finishes second, 2.5 points behind, while World Cup leader Jakub Janda of the Czech Republic is 8.3 points off in third place. TSN.ca

== 28 December 2005 (Wednesday) ==
- NCAA College Football
  - MPC Computers Bowl: Boston College 27, Boise State 21: After nearly blowing a 27–0 lead, the ACC's Eagles intercept a Jared Zabransky pass in the end zone with less than two minutes remaining to secure their sixth straight bowl win on the WAC host's hostile "Smurf Turf".
  - MasterCard Alamo Bowl: Nebraska 32, Michigan 28: Nebraska defeated Michigan following after a controversial play as time expired

== 27 December 2005 (Tuesday) ==
- NCAA College Football
  - Champs Sports Bowl: Clemson 19, Colorado 10: James Davis rushes for 148 yards and a touchdown as the ACC Tigers survived a game Big 12 Buffaloes comeback.
  - Insight Bowl: Arizona State 45, Rutgers 40: In the long-awaited rematch of the inaugural Garden State Bowl, the de facto host Sun Devils from the Pac-10 — behind Rudy Carpenter's four touchdown passes — rallied to defeat the Scarlet Knights from the Big East in what could very well be the last football game played at Chase Field. Next year's game will move to Sun Devil Stadium on the ASU campus. The teams combined for 1,211 yards total offense, a record for any bowl game.
- NCAA Men's College Basketball
  - (4) Memphis 83, (8) Gonzaga 72: The Tigers win at home to go to 10–1, their best start since 1985–86. The nation's leading scorer, Gonzaga's Adam Morrison, scores 34 points, but goes cold at the wrong time, failing to score in the final 9:31 of the game.
- Rugby Union
  - Jonah Lomu scores his first try since his 2004 kidney transplant. The All Blacks legend crosses the line for the Cardiff Blues early in the second half of a 41–23 Celtic League win over the Newport Gwent Dragons.

== 26 December 2005 (Monday) ==
- NCAA College Football
  - Motor City Bowl: Memphis 38, Akron 31: DeAngelo Williams scored three touchdowns, but the MAC Champion Zips gave C-USA's Tigers a scare late.
- NFL Monday Night Football
  - New England Patriots 31, New York Jets 21: In the final ABC broadcast of the series after thirty-six seasons and 555 games, the Pats prevailed thanks to two Mike Vrabel touchdown catches. In a major twist of fate, the Jets lost to Cleveland by the exact same score in the first Monday Night Football game played back in 1970. Next September, the MNF package will be moving to Disney-owned sibling ESPN.

== 25 December 2005 (Sunday) ==
- NBA Christmas Doubleheader
  - Detroit Pistons 85, San Antonio Spurs 70: Chauncey Billups registered 20 points as the Pistons got a measure of revenge in a rematch of last year's NBA Finals.
  - Miami Heat 97, Los Angeles Lakers 92: Kobe Bryant had 37 points for the Lakers, but fell short on South Beach as Shaquille O'Neal now goes to 3–0 against Kobe and the Lakers.
- NFL Week 16
  - Chicago Bears 24, Green Bay Packers 17: "Da Bears" win the NFC North Division championship and a first-round bye with their win over the Packers, intercepting Brett Favre four times.
  - Baltimore Ravens 30, Minnesota Vikings 23: The Vikings went from contenders at 4:59 p.m. US EST to elimination at 11:39 p.m. US EST with the Bears beating the Packers and their loss to the Ravens. Kyle Boller threw for 289 yards in the victory.

== 24 December 2005 (Saturday) ==
- NFL Week 16
  - Tampa Bay Buccaneers 27, Atlanta Falcons 24 (OT): Matt Bryant's 41-yard field goal with 14 seconds left in overtime eliminates the Falcons from post-season contention.
  - Buffalo Bills 37, Cincinnati Bengals 27: Terrence McGee has two touchdowns — a 99-yard kickoff return and a late 46-yard interception of Carson Palmer — to ruin the Bengals' hopes of a first-round bye. McGee becomes the first player in NFL history to return a kickoff and interception for TDs in the same game.
  - Dallas Cowboys 24, Carolina Panthers 20: A Drew Bledsoe two-yard TD pass to Terry Glenn with 24 seconds left keeps the Cowboys' post-season hopes alive.
  - At the Alamodome in San Antonio, Texas: Detroit Lions 13, New Orleans Saints 12: Jason Hanson's 39-yard field goal as time expires gives the Lions the win in the Saints' last "home game" of the year.
  - Jacksonville Jaguars 38, Houston Texans 20: The Jags trailed in the fourth quarter but come back to clinch a wild-card spot with the victory over the game Texans.
  - Washington Redskins 35, New York Giants 20: Santana Moss catches three TD passes, and the Redskins stay alive in the post-season hunt.
  - Pittsburgh Steelers 41, Cleveland Browns 0: The Steel Curtain defense sacks Charlie Frye eight times in the shutout.
  - Kansas City Chiefs 20, San Diego Chargers 7: The Chiefs, who hold LaDainian Tomlinson to 49 rushing yards, remain alive in the playoff race.
  - San Francisco 49ers 24, St. Louis Rams 20: The Niners put up 217 rushing yards in their first road win of the year, but in the process, could wind up losing the Reggie Bush/Vince Young/Matt Leinart Number One Draft Pick sweepstakes.
  - Miami Dolphins 24, Tennessee Titans 10: In his biggest day rushing since returning to football, Ricky Williams runs for 172 yards in the Dolphins' win.
  - Arizona Cardinals 27, Philadelphia Eagles 21: The Cards' eighteen-year stay at Sun Devil Stadium came to a victorious end. Next season, the team will move to their new stadium in Glendale.
  - Seattle Seahawks 28, Indianapolis Colts 13: The Seahawks clinched the top seed in the NFC playoffs with the win. Shaun Alexander scored his 27th touchdown of the season, tying the NFL record with a game left in the 2005 season.
  - Denver Broncos 22, Oakland Raiders 3: The Broncos clinched a first-round playoff bye with a win, finishing the season unbeaten at Invesco Field at Mile High.
- NCAA College Football
  - Sheraton Hawai'i Bowl: Nevada 49, Central Florida 48 (OT): Matt Prater missed an extra point in the overtime to give the WAC Wolf Pack the victory over the Golden Knights from C-USA.

== 23 December 2005 (Friday) ==
- Rugby Union
  - Wales and Ospreys centre Gavin Henson is handed a 10-week and 2 day ban by the International Rugby Board after a disciplinary panel finds him guilty of elbowing Leicester prop Alex Moreno in the face; the assault left Moreno with a broken nose. The ban means that Henson, who was such a vital player in Wales' 2005 Grand Slam success, will be suspended for the first three rounds of the 2006 Six Nations Championship. BBC
- NCAA College Football:
  - Fort Worth Bowl: Kansas 42, Houston 14: Jason Swanson threw for four touchdowns as the Big 12's Jayhawks blew out C-USA's Cougars.

== 22 December 2005 (Thursday) ==
- Cricket:
  - India defeats Sri Lanka by 259 runs in the 3rd Test at Chennai, India, winning the three-Test series 2–0. Cricinfo scorecard
- NCAA College Football
  - Pioneer Pure Vision Las Vegas Bowl: California 35, BYU 28: Marshawn Lynch had 194 yards rushing and three touchdowns as the Bears of the Pac-10 edged the Cougars from the MWC.
  - San Diego County Credit Union Poinsettia Bowl: Navy 51, Colorado State 30: Reggie Campbell tied an NCAA bowl record with five touchdowns — three rushing, two receiving — as the independent Midshipmen sailed to victory in the inaugural game over the MWC's Rams.
- NFL: Indianapolis Colts head coach Tony Dungy's son James, is found dead. The cause is apparently suicide
- NCAA Men's College Basketball
  - (3) Villanova 98, La Salle 57: In the first matchup of undefeated teams in the Big 5 of Philadelphia since Temple and Villanova were both 6–0 in 1981, and the only Big 5 matchup that pitted two 7–0 (or better) undefeated teams against each other, Villanova's Allan Ray and Randy Foye combine for 41 points to crush La Salle. The Wildcats, not surprisingly, have gone to 8–0, while the surprisingly successful Explorers fall to 7–1.
  - West Virginia 92, (7) Oklahoma 68: In a game that was close until fairly deep into the 2nd half, the Mountaineers scored 19 of the game's final 22 points, to, in his words, "embarrass" coach Kelvin Sampson. The Sooners, ranked in the top 10 in the country, fall to 6–2, while currently unranked West Virginia improves to 7–3 behind Kevin Pittsnogle's 25 points.

== 21 December 2005 (Wednesday) ==
- NCAA College Football
  - GMAC Bowl in Mobile, Alabama: Toledo 45, UTEP 13: Bruce Gradowski throws five touchdown passes and Trinity Dawson rushes for 132 yards to lead the MAC's Rockets in a rout of the C-USA Miners.
- Men's College Basketball: (1) Duke 70, St. John's (NY) 57: In the now annual game between the two schools, the Blue Devils win fairly easily to claim their 4th 11–0 start in the last 5 years. The Red Storm, however, are on the slide, losing their last three in a row (making them 5–4). JJ Redick led Duke with 18 points.

== 20 December 2005 (Tuesday) ==
- NBA: Kobe Bryant scored a career-high 62 points in only three quarters — including a club-record 30 in the third quarter alone — in the Los Angeles Lakers' 112–90 rout of the Dallas Mavericks. When he left after the third quarter, he outscored the entire Mavericks team, 62–61 and the entire third quarter, 30–17.
- MLB: Johnny Damon, the long-haired and bearded center fielder for the Boston Red Sox, agreed to a four-year deal with the BoSox's hated rival, the New York Yankees, which means he will cut his hair and shave the beard as per George Steinbrenner's dictation.
- Cricket
  - South Africa hang on for a draw in the first Test of their Three Test series against Australia in Perth, Australia. (Cricinfo scorecard)
- NCAA College Football
  - New Orleans Bowl in Lafayette, Louisiana: Southern Miss 31, Arkansas State 19: Cody Hull ran for 139 yards and Shawn Nelson caught six passes for 116 yards as the Golden Eagles from Conference USA defended their bowl title in an easy victory over the Sun Belt champions.

== 19 December 2005 (Monday) ==
- NHL: Larry Robinson resigns as head coach of the New Jersey Devils due to stress and severe migraines. Team president and general manager Lou Lamoriello will take over on an interim basis.
- NFL Monday Night Football
  - Baltimore Ravens 48, Green Bay Packers 3: The Ravens set a team record for scoring in this demolition of the Pack, the latter team's worst loss in a quarter century.
- Formula One: Team McLaren announce that reigning World Champion Fernando Alonso will drive for the team in the 2007 Formula One season. (McLaren.com press release)
- MLB: Former Boston Red Sox star shortstop Nomar Garciaparra signs a 1-year contract with the Los Angeles Dodgers. He is expected to play first base in Los Angeles, and questions of his health are numerous.

== 18 December 2005 (Sunday) ==
- Snooker: 18-year-old rising Chinese star Ding Junhui becomes the first person from outside the UK or Ireland to win the UK Championship, when he defeats the 48-year-old six-time former world champion Steve Davis by 10 frames to 6.
- Football: FIFA Club World Championship Final: São Paulo 1–0 Liverpool: Miniero's goal in the 28th minute gives the Brazilians the FIFA World Club championship despite Liverpool's dominance of the game, having 17 corner kicks to São Paulo's none. In the third-place match, Costa Rica's Deportivo Saprissa defeated Saudi Arabia's Al-Ittihad by 3–2.
- NFL Week 15
  - Houston Texans 30, Arizona Cardinals 19: The Texans win their second game of the year thanks to six sacks and a 24-point second quarter.
  - At LSU Tiger Stadium in Baton Rouge, Louisiana: Carolina Panthers 27, New Orleans Saints 10: Todd Bouman, playing for the benched Aaron Brooks, throws four interceptions for New Orleans.
  - Miami Dolphins 24, New York Jets 20: Backup quarterback Sage Rosenfels throws a fourth-quarter 50-yard touchdown to Marty Booker, and the Dolphins defense holds for a win.
  - Philadelphia Eagles 17, St. Louis Rams 16: Ryan Moats scores on a 59-yard run, and Mike McMahon hits Mike Bartrum for the game-winning touchdown pass in a sloppy Eagles win.
  - Pittsburgh Steelers 18, Minnesota Vikings 3: The Steelers defense holds Minnesota to minus-20 yards on the Vikings' final four possessions.
  - San Diego Chargers 26, Indianapolis Colts 17: Michael Turner's 83-yard touchdown run for San Diego ensures the Colts' first loss of the year. The Chargers sack Peyton Manning four times, pick him off twice and hold Indy to 24 rushing yards.
  - Jacksonville Jaguars 10, San Francisco 49ers: The 49ers complete only 8 of 24 passes and go 0-for-12 on third-down conversions; Josh Scobee's 32-yard field goal proves the difference.
  - Seattle Seahawks 28, Tennessee Titans 24: Seattle clinches a first-round playoff bye thanks to three touchdowns from Matt Hasselbeck and a 172-yard day from Shaun Alexander.
  - Cincinnati Bengals 41, Detroit Lions 17: Carson Palmer throws three first-half touchdowns as Cincinnati clinches its first division title since 1988.
  - Cleveland Browns 9, Oakland Raiders 7: Shortly after Alvin McKinley blocks a Sebastian Janikowski field-goal attempt, the Browns' Phil Dawson kicks his third three-pointer of the game as time expires.
  - Washington Redskins 35, Dallas Cowboys 7: Mark Brunell throws four touchdown passes — three to Chris Cooley — before halftime. After the game, an angry Bill Parcells refuses to shake Joe Gibbs' hand.
  - Chicago Bears 16, Atlanta Falcons 3: The Bears defense stymies Michael Vick all evening; Rex Grossman makes his first appearance of the season in relief of Kyle Orton.

== 17 December 2005 (Saturday) ==
- College Football: Mount Union defeated Wisconsin–Whitewater 35–28 to win the NCAA Division III Championship at the Amos Alonzo Stagg Bowl in Salem, Virginia. It is the eighth championship for the Purple Raiders in thirteen seasons.
- Boxing: In Berlin, Germany, Russian Nicolay Valuev became the tallest (7 feet; 2.1 meters tall) and largest (330 pounds; 150 kg) to win a heavyweight championship in a controversial majority decision over John Ruiz to win the WBA version of the title.
- NHL: Phoenix Coyotes coach and part owner Wayne Gretzky takes an indefinite leave of absence from his duties as coach of the team due to his mother suffering from lung cancer. Assistant coach Rick Tocchet will serve as interim coach.
- NFL Week 15
  - New England Patriots 28, Tampa Bay Buccaneers 0: The Patriots, who held the Bucs to 30 rushing yards and sack Chris Simms seven times, clinch the AFC East.
  - New York Giants 27, Kansas City Chiefs 17: Tiki Barber rushes for a team-record 220 yards and two touchdowns, including a 20-yard score with 3:43 left. He outdoes Larry Johnson, who had 167 yards and two touchdowns for the Chiefs.
  - Denver Broncos 27 Buffalo Bills 17: Rod Smith catches 11 passes — nine in the first half — for 137 yards and a touchdown, and Denver clinches the AFC West.
- NCAA Men's College Basketball
  - Tennessee 95, (6) Texas 78: After an embarrassing defeat at the hands of #1 Duke the previous week while #2 in the country, Texas is crushed by unranked, but unbeaten, Tennessee in Austin. It is assumed Texas will drop more ranks, possibly out of the Top 10, when the next poll is taken on Monday. Chris Lofton led Tennessee with 21 points, while P. J. Tucker had 20 for Texas.
  - (23) Kentucky 73, (4) Louisville 61: After a bad previous weekend (losing to Indiana 79–53), Tubby Smith and the Wildcats stifle Louisville's offense to go on to the 12-point win, behind Rajon Rondo's 21-point game. Kentucky improves to 7–3, while Louisville is no longer undefeated at 6–1. Louisville's six wins had all been against mid-major squads.
  - (14) UCLA 68, Michigan 61: The Wolverines became yet another team to suffer their first loss of the season. It comes at home to the hands of ranked rival UCLA. The Bruins improve to 8–1 with their only loss coming to 5th ranked Memphis (88–80). Michigan is now 7–1.

== 16 December 2005 (Friday) ==
- College football: Appalachian State defeats Northern Iowa 21–16 to win the NCAA Division I-AA national football championship. This is the first football title for the Mountaineers, and the school's first team NCAA title in any sport.
- Football: In Nyon, Switzerland, the draw takes place for the knockout Round of 16 of the UEFA Champions League and Round of 32 of the UEFA Cup. Particularly anticipated is the rerun of last season's meeting at the same stage of the Champions League between Chelsea and Barcelona.

== 15 December 2005 (Thursday) ==
- Football: 2005–06 UEFA Cup Matchday 5
  - Group A: AS Monaco 2–1 CSKA Sofia
  - Group A: Hamburg 2–0 Slavia Prague
  - Group B: Espanyol 1–0 Maccabi Petach Tikva
  - Group B: Palermo 3–0 Brøndby
  - Group C: Hertha BSC Berlin 0–0 Steaua Bucharest
  - Group C: Lens 2–1 Sampdoria
  - Group D: Middlesbrough 2–0 Litex Lovech
  - Group D: AZ Alkmaar 1–0 Grasshopper

== 14 December 2005 (Wednesday) ==
- Baseball: The United States Treasury Department has ruled Cuba's national baseball team cannot participate in the 2006 World Baseball Classic.
- Football:
  - Boca Juniors obtained its 22nd Argentine Championship at the last match of the 2005 Apertura, beating Olimpo de Bahía Blanca 2 to 1 a visitors.
  - 2005–06 UEFA Cup Matchday 5
    - Group E: Strasbourg 2–2 Red Star Belgrade
    - Group E: Roma 3–1 FC Basel
    - Group F: Marseille 2–1 Dinamo București: In a controversial finish, a late Dinamo goal in added time was disallowed by the referee because time had expired. Had it been allowed, Dinamo would have been in the final 32.
    - Group F: Heerenveen 2–1 Levski Sofia: The win by Heerenveen eliminates defending champion CSKA Moscow from defending the title.
    - Group G: VfB Stuttgart 2–1 Rapid București
    - Group G: PAOK 5–1 Rennes
    - Group H: Vitória Guimarães 1–3 Beşiktaş
    - Group H: Bolton Wanderers 1–1 Sevilla

== 13 December 2005 (Tuesday) ==
- Track and field: American sprinter Tim Montgomery was banned for two years by the Court of Arbitration for Sport for rumored use of illegal performance-enhancing drugs as a result of his involvement in the BALCO scandal. In addition, his :09.79 world record set in 2001 was removed from the record books. Another American sprinter, Chryste Gaines, was given a similar penalty for her involvement. Neither had failed a urine analysis test, but both will forfeit any medals they had won in competition. The United States Anti-Doping Agency had requested four-year bans for both. (AP/Yahoo!)

== 12 December 2005 (Monday) ==
- NBA: Pat Riley will return to coaching as interim coach of the Miami Heat after the resignation of Stan Van Gundy.
- NFL Monday Night Football
  - Atlanta Falcons 36, New Orleans Saints 17: Michael Vick throws for two touchdowns and runs for a third, but is injured in the fourth quarter of the rout of New Orleans.

== 11 December 2005 (Sunday) ==
- Swimming:
  - 2005 European Short Course Championships in Trieste, Italy ends. Hungary was best with six gold and one bronze.
- NFL Week 14
  - Pittsburgh Steelers 21, Chicago Bears 9: The Steelers end the Bears' eight-game winning streak thanks to a 101-yard, two-touchdown game from Jerome Bettis in a driving snowstorm.
  - Cincinnati Bengals 23, Cleveland Browns 20: Rudi Johnson rushes for 169 yards, and Shayne Graham kicks a game-winning 37-yard field goal.
  - Indianapolis Colts 26, Jacksonville Jaguars 18: The Colts clinch the AFC's Number One playoff seed and become the fourth NFL team to win their first 13 games; Peyton Manning throws for 324 yards.
  - Tennessee Titans 13, Houston Texans 10: Kris Brown misses on a 31-yard field goal on the last play; Pacman Jones returns a punt 52 yards for a touchdown for the Titans.
  - New England Patriots 35, Buffalo Bills 7: Lake-effect snow off Lake Erie couldn't stop the Patriots' defense, as they held the Bills to a total of fourteen rushing yards.
  - New York Jets 26, Oakland Raiders 10: The Jets record six sacks and two interceptions of Raiders quarterback Marques Tuiasosopo.
  - Minnesota Vikings 27, St. Louis Rams 13: Minnesota picks off Ryan Fitzpatrick five times in winning its sixth straight game.
  - Tampa Bay Buccaneers 20, Carolina Panthers 10: Cadillac Williams has 112 yards and two touchdowns for the Bucs, who tie the Pathers for first place in the NFC South.
  - New York Giants 26 Philadelphia Eagles 23 (OT): Struggling Giants kicker Jay Feely kicks four field goals, including the 36-yard game-winner in overtime. With the loss, the Eagles are eliminated from playoff contention, marking the fourth straight year that the NFC Champion from the previous season failed to make the playoffs.
  - Seattle Seahawks 41, San Francisco 49ers 3: The win, combined with the Rams' loss at Minnesota, clinches the NFC West for the Seahawks.
  - Washington Redskins 17, Arizona Cardinals 13: Antonio Brown's 91-yard kickoff return proves the difference for the Redskins.
  - Denver Broncos 12, Baltimore Ravens 10: Kyle Boller throws two costly red zone interceptions for the Ravens.
  - Dallas Cowboys 31, Kansas City Chiefs 28: Drew Bledsoe throws a 1-yard touchdown pass to Dan Campbell, then Lawrence Tynes misses a 41-yard field-goal attempt as time expires.
  - Miami Dolphins 23, San Diego Chargers 21: Chris Chambers has another big day for Miami, catching eight passes for 121 yards and two touchdowns. The Chargers are still tied with the Chiefs.
  - Green Bay Packers 16, Detroit Lions 13 (OT): Samkon Gado rushed for 171 yards, and Ryan Longwell's 28-yard field goal in the extra session gave the Pack a much deserved win on the "frozen tundra" of Lambeau Field.

== 10 December 2005 (Saturday) ==
- NCAA Men's College Basketball: (1) Duke 97, (2) Texas 66: The showdown at The Meadowlands was more of a lopsided affair as JJ Redick led the Blue Devils with 41 points, including nine three-point baskets, outshooting the whole Longhorn team (who could only get three trifectas) by himself. LaMarcus Aldridge led Texas with 23 points.
- College Football: Reggie Bush wins the 2005 Heisman Trophy as the best player in college football. The Heisman is probably the most-venerated individual honor in American sports.
- Rugby union: All Blacks legend Jonah Lomu makes his first competitive appearance since undergoing a kidney transplant in 2004, playing 60 minutes for the Cardiff Blues in a 25–10 Heineken Cup win over Calvisano.

== 9 December 2005 (Friday) ==
- Football: The draw for the groups of the 2006 World Cup takes place in Leipzig, Germany. Group E (Italy, Ghana, USA, Czech Republic) and Group C (Argentina, Côte d'Ivoire, Serbia & Montenegro, Netherlands) are widely regarded as the competition's Groups of Death. Hosts Germany will open play against Costa Rica in Group A while Brazil, the defending World Champions, head up Group F. (FIFAworldcup.com)

== 8 December 2005 (Thursday) ==
- Baseball: The final remnants of Busch Stadium II, home of the St. Louis Cardinals from 1966 to 2005, were demolished in the early morning hours, as a special fireworks display that followed signaled the end of one era, and the beginning of another era, as Busch Stadium III is scheduled to officially open on April 10, 2006, as the Cardinals host the Milwaukee Brewers.

== 7 December 2005 (Wednesday) ==
- Basketball:
  - NBA: The New Jersey Nets defeat the Charlotte Bobcats, 97–84, to score the franchise's 1,000th win. nba.com
- Biathlon: World Cup meet 2/10 in Hochfilzen, Austria: The 15 km individual race is won by a clear margin by Anna Carin Olofsson; her first appearance at the top of the podium, and the first Swedish WC win since 2001. Russian teammates Olga Zaitseva and Natalia Guseva finishes second and third, 40 seconds and 1 min 45 sec behind, respectively. Olofsson and Guseva had two shooting errors, while Zaitseva, advancing to the lead in the WC total score, made only one error. (Biathlonworld)
- Football: 2005–06 UEFA Champions League Group stage, Matchday 6:
  - Teams qualifying for the round of 16 are in 'bold type'. Teams going into the UEFA Cup are in italics.
    - Group A: Rapid Vienna 1–3 'Juventus'
    - Group A: Club Brugge 1–1 'Bayern Munich'
    - Group B: 'Arsenal' 0–0 'Ajax'
    - Group B: Sparta Prague 0–0 FC Thun
    - Group C: Udinese 0–2 'Barcelona'
    - Group C: 'Werder Bremen' 5–1 Panathinaikos
    - Group D: 'Villarreal' 1–0 Lille
    - Group D: 'Benfica' 2–1 Manchester United
    - Draw for the Round of 16 takes place on 16 December. Round of 16 first leg: 21 –22 February 2006.

== 6 December 2005 (Tuesday) ==
- Football: 2005–06 UEFA Champions League Group stage, Matchday 6.
  - Teams qualifying for the round of 16 are in 'bold type'. Teams going into the UEFA Cup are in italics.
    - Group E: 'A.C. Milan' 3–2 Schalke 04
    - Group E: 'PSV' 2–0 Fenerbahçe
    - Group F: 'Lyon' 2–1 Rosenborg
    - Group F: Olympiakos 2–1 'Real Madrid'
    - Group G: 'Chelsea' 0–0 'Liverpool'
    - Group G: Real Betis 0–1 Anderlecht
    - Group H: 'Rangers' 1–1 'Internazionale'
    - Group H: Artmedia Bratislava 0–0 Porto

== 5 December 2005 (Monday) ==
- NFL Monday Night Football
  - Seattle Seahawks 42, Philadelphia Eagles 0: The Eagles retired Reggie White's number 92 at halftime, the home team was pretty much retired before that. The Seahawks used three turnover returns for touchdowns — two of them by Andre Dyson — and two Shaun Alexander touchdowns to thrash the "Beagles".
- Multi-sport events
  - The 2005 Southeast Asian Games in the Philippines ends with the hosts topping the medal tally. The next games are to be held in 2007 in Thailand.

== 4 December 2005 (Sunday) ==
- NCAA
  - College football: In the Bowl Championship Series games, as expected, Southern California and Texas, the number one and two teams all season long, were placed into the Rose Bowl for the National Championship game January 4. In the other three games that make up the BCS, the Orange Bowl chooses Big Ten co-champion Penn State to face ACC winner Florida State on January 3. In the two games that are scheduled for January 2, the Fiesta Bowl selects Notre Dame and the other co-champion of the Big Ten, Ohio State after both met criteria set forth by the BCS, and SEC champion Georgia and West Virginia out of the Big East will face off in the Sugar Bowl. More bowl matchups were announced and can be found on this page.
  - Women's soccer: In the final of the 2005 College Cup, the Portland Pilots, behind two goals by Canada international Christine Sinclair, shut out UCLA by a 4–0 score, made even more incredible by the fact that the Bruins had shut out all their previous five NCAA tournament opponents before this game. The Pilots finish the season unbeaten (24 wins, 2 draws).
- National Football League Week 13
  - Carolina Panthers 24, Atlanta Falcons 6: The Panthers sack Michael Vick five times and intercept him twice; DeShaun Foster rushes for 131 yards.
  - Miami Dolphins 24, Buffalo Bills 23: Chris Chambers' fifteenth reception — a 4-yard touchdown from Sage Rosenfels with six seconds left — caps a 21-point fourth-quarter Miami comeback.
  - Cincinnati Bengals 38, Pittsburgh Steelers 31: Ben Roethlisberger throws for 386 yards, but the Bengals intercept him three times as they take a two-game lead in the AFC North.
  - New York Giants 17, Dallas Cowboys 10: The Giants defense forces four turnovers, including a fumble returned for a touchdown, and sacks Drew Bledsoe four times to take first place in the NFC East.
  - Chicago Bears 19, Green Bay Packers 6: The Bears' defense comes up with four turnovers, including a late interception returned for a touchdown by Nathan Vasher.
  - Baltimore Ravens 16, Houston Texans 15: Kyle Boller leads the Ravens on a last-minute drive that ends in a game-winning 38-yard field goal by Matt Stover.
  - Jacksonville Jaguars 20, Cleveland Browns 14: The Jaguars sack Browns rookie quarterback Charlie Frye five times in the second half; Greg Jones rushes for 103 yards.
  - Minnesota Vikings 21, Detroit Lions 16: The Vikings win their fifth-straight game thanks to a 17-for-23 performance from Brad Johnson.
  - At LSU Tiger Stadium in Baton Rouge, Tampa Bay Buccaneers 10, New Orleans Saints 3: Ronde Barber intercepts Aaron Brooks three times, including an end-zone pickoff with 1:33 left.
  - Indianapolis Colts 35, Tennessee Titans 3: Peyton Manning throws three touchdown passes as the Colts go to 12–0, and become the first team to clinch a playoff berth.
  - Arizona Cardinals 17, San Francisco 49ers 10: Kurt Warner and Anquan Boldin connected for a 54-yard touchdown to give the Cards a win and keep the 49ers in last place in the NFC West.
  - Washington Redskins 24, St. Louis Rams 9: Clinton Portis rushed for 136 yards and two touchdowns in the Redskins' win, which clinches the NFC West for the Seattle Seahawks.
  - Kansas City Chiefs 31, Denver Broncos 27: Thanks to an overturn on replay on a fourth and one that the Broncos had thought was a first down, the Chiefs won their seventeenth straight game at home in Arrowhead Stadium during the month of December.
  - New England Patriots 16, New York Jets 3: Adam Vinatieri becomes the all-time leading scorer in Pats history as the defending champions beat the battered Jets.
  - San Diego Chargers 34, Oakland Raiders 10: Drew Brees throws for 160 yards and two touchdowns, while LaDainian Tomlinson has a total of 110 yards, as the Chargers rout the Raiders for their fifth straight win.

== 3 December 2005 (Saturday) ==
- NCAA Men's College Basketball
  - (4) Villanova 85, (5) Oklahoma 74: In an early matchup of Top 5 teams, Villanova's outstanding guard play is enough to outscore Oklahoma's stars. Villanova star Randy Foye accounted for 32 of Nova's points on the night, while often injured big man Jason Fraser added 10 of his own. It was the 4th game for Nova who go to 4–0 and was the fifth for Oklahoma who fall to 4–1. Both teams are thought of as perennial contenders for the final four.
  - North Carolina 83, (10) Kentucky 79: Defending champion North Carolina, who is unranked coming into the game, defeats Top 10 team Kentucky behind 25 points from Reyshawn Terry and 6 from freshman star Tyler Hansbrough, who also had 9 rebounds. UNC improved to 4–1, while Kentucky fell to 5–2.
- Boxing: Jermain Taylor defeats Bernard Hopkins by a razor-thin unanimous decision, scoring 115–113 on all three ringside judges' scorecards and retains the undisputed middleweight championship in Las Vegas, Nevada.
- NCAA College Football (Includes all AP Top 25 teams)
  - Conference Championship Games
    - Conference USA: Tulsa 44, UCF 27: The Golden Hurricane storm into the Citrus Bowl, upset the home team and earn a trip to the Liberty Bowl.
    - Big 12 at Reliant Stadium, Houston: Texas 70, Colorado 3: The Longhorns steamroll into the Rose Bowl with a six-touchdown performance in the first half. Heisman Trophy candidate Vince Young was responsible for four of those touchdowns, three through the air and running in another.
    - SEC at Georgia Dome, Atlanta: (13) Georgia 34, (3) LSU 14: The "homestanding" Bulldogs, led by D.J. Shockley, upset the Tigers and will return to Atlanta to meet West Virginia in the Sugar Bowl as the game moves from its regular home at the Louisiana Superdome in New Orleans due to damage suffered by Hurricane Katrina.
    - ACC at ALLTEL Stadium in Jacksonville, Florida: Florida State 27, (5) Virginia Tech 22: The Seminoles win the first ACC Championship Game in a stunning upset of the Hokies, mostly due to turnovers and in spite of a late comeback by VPI. Next for Bobby Bowden: A date in the Orange Bowl against Joe Paterno and the Penn State Nittany Lions.
  - Army–Navy Game in Philadelphia: Despite a 257-yard, three touchdown performance from Army QB Zac Dahman, Navy wins their fourth straight game, 42–23 behind 490 yards rushing, 129 of them by Adam Ballard. The Poinsettia Bowl-bound Midshipmen take home the Commander-in-Chief's Trophy, by virtue of beating both Army and Air Force for the third straight year. and now lead the series 50–49 with seven ties
  - (1) Southern California 66, (11) UCLA 19: The Trojans manhandled the Bruins to earn a trip to the Rose Bowl on January 4 against Texas, thanks to Heisman Trophy candidate Reggie Bush's 260 yards rushing and 2 TDs.
  - (12) West Virginia 28, South Florida 13
  - (16) Louisville 30, UConn 20
- Canadian football
  - Vanier Cup in Hamilton: Wilfrid Laurier 24, Saskatchewan 23: The Golden Hawks win the championship of Canadian university football on a 32-yard field goal with 19 seconds left.

== 2 December 2005 (Friday) ==
- NCAA College Football AP Top 25
  - Louisiana Tech 40, (23) Fresno State 28: The Fresno State loss — their third straight — gives Nevada and Boise State shares of the WAC title. However, La Tech will not go to a bowl game as the WAC had only three slots available.

== 1 December 2005 (Thursday) ==
- 23rd Southeast Asian Games: Philippine President Gloria Macapagal Arroyo orders an investigation over Thai PM Thaksin Shinawatra's complaint on allegedly unfair favoring of Filipino athletes in the games. (Philippine Daily Inquirer)
- Football: 2005–06 UEFA Cup: Group stage, Matchday 4, Groups E–H:
  - Group E: Red Star Belgrade 3–1 Roma
  - Group E: FC Basel 4–3 Tromsø
  - Group F: Levski Sofia 1–0 Marseille
  - Group F: Dinamo Bucharest 1–0 PFC CSKA Moscow
  - Group G: Rennes 0–1 Shakhtar Donetsk
  - Group G: Rapid București 1–0 PAOK
  - Group H: Sevilla 3–1 Vitória Guimarães
  - Group H: Beşiktaş 1–1 Zenit St. Petersburg
- NCAA College Football: MAC Championship Game in Detroit
  - Akron 31, Northern Illinois 30: After missing the 2004–05 bowl season with a 7–4 record, Akron wins its first MAC championship on a 36-yard touchdown pass to Domenik Hixon with 10 seconds left. The Zips advance to the Motor City Bowl, their first bowl game ever as a Division I-A member.
