= January 2006 in sports =

<<	January 2006					>>
Su	Mo	Tu	We	Th	Fr	Sa
1	2	3	4	5	6	7
8	9	10	11	12	13	14
15	16	17	18	19	20	21
22	23	24	25	26	27	28
29	30	31
Sports

This list shows notable sports-related deaths, events, and notable outcomes that occurred in January 2006.

== Deaths ==
- 24: Carlos Martínez
- 19: Tom Nugent
- 19: Geoff Rabone
- 17: Seth Morehead
- 14: Bubba Morton
- 14: Mark Philo
- 11: Eric Namesnik
- 10: Dave Brown
- 9: Andy Caldecott
- 9: Jack Snow
- 8: Elson Becerra
- 7: Heinrich Harrer
- 5: Rod Dedeaux
- 2: Steve Rogers
- 1: Paul Lindblad

== Sporting seasons ==
- Cricket 2005–06: Australia; West Indies
- Football (soccer) 2005–06:
  - England: Premier League; England (general)
  - Scotland
  - Denmark: Superliga
  - France: Ligue 1;
  - UEFA Champions League; UEFA Cup
  - Argentina
  - Australia: Hyundai A-League
- Rugby union 2005–06: Heineken Cup
- U.S. and Canadian sports 2005–06:
  - NFL Playoffs; NHL; NBA

== 31 January 2006 (Tuesday) ==
- Football: 2006 African Cup of Nations
  - Group D: Nigeria 2–1 Senegal Nigeria finishes with a perfect record in the group. Senegal backs into the quarterfinals thanks to Zimbabwe's win over Ghana.
  - Group D: Ghana 1–2 Zimbabwe
- NCAA Men's College Basketball:
  - (1) UConn 80, (9) Pittsburgh 76: The homestanding Huskies, behind 22 points from Rudy Gay, win a physical matchup against the Panthers.
  - (6) Illinois 66, Wisconsin 51: For the second straight year, the Fighting Illini go to the Badgers' fortress home court, Kohl Center, and come away with a win. The Illini get 16 points from Dee Brown and Rich McBride, and take command of the game with a 19–0 run late in the first half. They also take sole possession of the Big Ten lead.
  - Creighton 63, (25) Northern Iowa 55: The Panthers go into Omaha as a ranked team for the first time, but leave the same way as they have every year since 1996—losing to the Bluejays.

== 30 January 2006 (Monday) ==
- Football:
  - 2006 African Cup of Nations
    - Group C: Tunisia 0–3 Guinea Guinea makes 3 wins out of 3 in a surprise defeat of the title holders. Both countries progress to the quarter-finals.
    - Group C: Zambia 1–0 South Africa
  - FA Cup: In the fifth-round draw, Manchester United and Liverpool will meet on the weekend of February 18.
- NCAA College Basketball: AP Polls
  - Men's: UConn, Duke, and Memphis remain in the top three spots. In other highlights:
    - George Washington rises to No. 10, their first top-10 ranking since 1956.
    - Northern Iowa enters the rankings for the first time ever, at No. 25.
  - Women's: As expected, North Carolina earns its first No. 1 ranking in history. Duke remains #2. Other highlights:
    - Tennessee drops to No. 5 after losses to Duke and Kentucky.
    - Kentucky enters the poll for the first time since 1993, at No. 21. This is also the first time since 1990 that Kentucky's women have been ranked and their men have not.
    - St. John's enters the poll at No. 25 after an even longer absence, since 1984.

== 29 January 2006 (Sunday) ==
- Football
  - 2006 African Cup of Nations
    - Group B: Angola 3–2 Togo
    - Group B: Cameroon 2–0 Congo DR Cameroon top the group with a perfect record from three matches. Congo DR backs into the knockout phase; if Angola or Cameroon had scored one more goal, Angola would have advanced instead.
  - FA Cup fourth round
    - Portsmouth 1–2 Liverpool
    - Wolverhampton Wanderers 0–3 Manchester United
- Tennis: Australian Open: Roger Federer defeats Marcos Baghdatis 5–7, 7–5, 6–0, 6–2 to win the men's championship. It is Federer's seventh Grand Slam title.
- NCAA Women's College Basketball:
  - (3) North Carolina 74, (2) Duke 70: In a showdown between the last two unbeaten women's teams in Division I, the Tar Heels come back from a 13-point halftime deficit at Duke. With this win and Tennessee's two losses in the past week, the Tar Heels are all but assured of their first-ever Number 1 women's ranking.

== 28 January 2006 (Saturday) ==
- Football
  - 2006 African Cup of Nations
    - Group A: Egypt 3–1 Ivory Coast Egypt top the group; Ivory Coast, which had already qualified for the knockout phase, finish second.
    - Group A: Libya 0–0 Morocco
  - FA Cup Fourth round
    - Stoke City 2–1 Walsall
    - Cheltenham Town 0–2 Newcastle United
    - Coventry City 1–1 Middlesbrough
    - Reading 1–1 Birmingham City: Championship leaders Reading earns a replay at Birmingham City's home.
    - Bolton Wanderers 1–0 Arsenal: The defending cup holders are eliminated thanks to Stelios Giannakopoulos' goal at Reebok Stadium.
    - Aston Villa 3–1 Port Vale
    - Brentford 2–1 Sunderland: The Premiership's current wooden spoon holders are ousted by a League One team.
    - Manchester City 1–0 Wigan Athletic
    - Everton 1–1 Chelsea
    - Preston North End 1–1 Crystal Palace
    - West Ham United 4–2 Blackburn Rovers
    - Colchester United 3–1 Derby County
    - Charlton Athletic 2–1 Leyton Orient
- College football bowl game:
  - Senior Bowl:
    - In the concluding game of the 2005–06 college football season, the North squad's Jay Cutler threw a winning touchdown pass as the North won the Senior Bowl in Mobile, Alabama, over the South, 31–14. (ESPN)
- Tennis: 2006 Australian Open:
  - Amélie Mauresmo defeats Justine Henin-Hardenne to win the Australian Open in Melbourne. Mauresmo wins the first set 6–1, and leads 2–0 in set 2, when Henin-Hardenne retires because of a stomach ailment. (AP/Yahoo!)
  - The men's doubles pairing of American twin Bob and Mike Bryan defeat Martin Damm (CZE) and Leander Paes (India) in the final 4–6, 6–3, 6–3.
- Boxing:
  - Former WBO world Jr. Welterweight champion Randall Bailey collapses before a fight. He is taken to a local hospital. His fight is cancelled.
  - Arturo Gatti scores an eleventh-round knockout of Thomas Damgaard, in Atlantic City, New Jersey.

== 27 January 2006 (Friday) ==
- Football
  - 2006 African Cup of Nations
    - Group D: Ghana 1–0 Senegal
    - Group D: Nigeria 2–0 Zimbabwe
  - FA Premier League 2005-06
    - Man United defender Gary Neville is charged with improper conduct by the Football Association for his goal celebration in his team's win over Liverpool. (BBC)
  - Euro 2008
    - The draw for the qualifying rounds for the UEFA Championships was held in Montreux, Switzerland, with defending champion Greece slotted in Group C. The top two teams from the seven pools will join co-hosts Austria and Switzerland in the summer of 2008 for the final round.

== 26 January 2006 (Thursday) ==
- Football:
  - 2006 African Cup of Nations
    - Group C: Zambia 1–2 Guinea
    - Group C: Tunisia 2–0 South Africa

Both winners advance to the knockout phase.

  - Real Zaragoza ended FC Barcelona's 18-match Copa del Rey winning streak in the first leg of their tie, winning 4–2.
- NCAA Women's College Basketball:
  - Kentucky 66, (1) Tennessee 63: In a rare women's game at Rupp Arena, the Wildcats beat the Lady Vols for the first time in 20 years. Tennessee coach Pat Summitt goes 0–2 since winning her 900th game as coach, and the Lady Vols lose their second straight game for the first time since 1997.

== 25 January 2006 (Wednesday) ==
- NBA: The on-again, off-again trade between the Sacramento Kings and the Indiana Pacers is completed, with Peja Stojaković going from Sacramento to Indiana for Ron Artest.
- MLS: The franchise formerly known as the San Jose Earthquakes, having moved to Houston, is renamed as Houston 1836.
- Football: 2006 African Cup of Nations
  - Group B: Angola 0–0 Congo DR
  - Group B: Cameroon 2–0 Togo Cameroon advance to the knockout phase, while Togo are eliminated.
- NCAA Men's College Basketball:
  - South Carolina 68, (5) Florida 62: The homestanding Gamecocks hand the Gators their second consecutive loss after a 17–0 start.
  - Marshall 58, (9) West Virginia 52: The Thundering Herd hold the Mountaineers to their lowest point total of the season and shock their in-state rivals in Charleston. Mark Patton led the Herd with 16 points and 10 rebounds; Kevin Pittsnogle scored 20 for the Mountaineers.
- Cricket: The Second Test between Pakistan and India at Iqbal Stadium, Faisalabad, ends in a draw. The three-Test series is tied 0–0, with one Test to be played.

== 24 January 2006 (Tuesday) ==
- NHL: Mario Lemieux announces his second — and likely last — retirement at the age of 40 from the Pittsburgh Penguins, effective immediately due to heart conditions. He became the first man to be a member of the Hockey Hall of Fame, and play on, be president of and have a stake as a team owner. (Story from nhl.com)
- Football: 2006 African Cup of Nations
  - Group A: Libya 1 – 2 Ivory Coast: Ivory Coast advances to the elimination stage.
  - Group A: Egypt 0 – 0 Morocco

== 23 January 2006 (Monday) ==
- Auto racing
  - Toyota announces its will enter the NASCAR NEXTEL Cup and Busch Series for the 2007 season; its Camry will be the first car from marking the first time since the late 1950s that a car from a manufacturer operating principally abroad since the late 1950s. Toyota Press Release on NASCAR.com
  - In addition, NASCAR announces the phasing in of its "Car of Tomorrow" program starting with the short tracks and road courses during the 2007 season. The program will be fully implemented by 2009.
- Football: 2006 African Cup of Nations
  - Group D: Nigeria 1–0 Ghana (BBC)
  - Group D: Zimbabwe 0–2 Senegal (BBC)
- NCAA College Basketball:
  - Men's: (12) Pittsburgh 80, (25) Syracuse 67: The Panthers, behind a career-high 32 points from guard Carl Krauser, bounce back at home from their first loss of the season. The Orange lose their third game in eight days, all to teams ranked 12th or better.
  - Women's: (2) Duke 75, (1) Tennessee 53: In front of a sellout crowd of Cameron Crazies, five Blue Devils score in double figures during their rout of the Lady Vols.

== 22 January 2006 (Sunday) ==
- NBA
  - Kobe Bryant scored 81 points — the most by an NBA player since March 2, 1962, when Wilt Chamberlain recorded his 100-point performance against the New York Knicks — in the Los Angeles Lakers' 122–104 win over the Toronto Raptors. He would score 55 points in the second half, while the rest of his team combined scored 18.
  - Seattle SuperSonics 152, Phoenix Suns 149 (2 OT): Ray Allen's three point basket with time expiring was the difference in this game. The teams combined for the most points (301) since April 1, 1995, and it was the first time a team posted 150 points on the scoresheet since March 15, 1998, when the Dallas Mavericks beat the Houston Rockets, 156–147 which was also in double overtime.
- NFL Playoffs: Conference Championships
  - AFC: Pittsburgh Steelers 34, Denver Broncos 17: The Steelers become the first No. 6 playoff seed to advance to the Super Bowl. Ben Roethlisberger completes 21 of 29 passes for 275 yards and two touchdowns and runs for a third score. Broncos quarterback Jake Plummer throws two interceptions and loses two fumbles.
  - NFC: Seattle Seahawks 34, Carolina Panthers 14: The Seahawks advance to their first Super Bowl. Seattle's defense holds Steve Smith to 33 receiving yards and intercepts Jake Delhomme three times. Shaun Alexander rushes for 132 yards and two touchdowns.
  - In non-playoff news, Dick Jauron, who served as interim coach of the Detroit Lions after Steve Mariucci's firing, was announced as the new head coach of the Buffalo Bills, and after the AFC Championship Game, the Houston Texans named Broncos offensive coordinator Gary Kubiak as their new coach.
- Football: 2006 African Cup of Nations
  - Group C: Tunisia 4–1 Zambia The African champions successfully begin the defence of their title with a hat-trick from Francileudo dos Santos. (BBC)
  - Group C: South Africa 0–2 Guinea (BBC)
- Snooker, Saga Insurance Masters: Scotsman John Higgins comes back to take the last two frames of the Masters final, beating Ronnie O'Sullivan by ten frames to nine. (BBC)
- Speed skating: American Joey Cheek wins the men's World sprint speed skating championships in Heerenveen, Netherlands ahead of Russian Dmitry Dorofeyev and Dutchman Jan Bos. In the women's championship, Svetlana Zhurova becomes the first Russian since 1982 to win a women's sprint title. (Reuters)

== 21 January 2006 (Saturday) ==
- Football: 2006 African Cup of Nations
  - Group A: Morocco 0–1 Ivory Coast (BBC)
  - Group B: Cameroon 3–1 Angola (BBC)
  - Group B: Togo 0–2 Congo DR (BBC)
- NCAA Men's College Basketball:
  - St. John's 55, (9) Pittsburgh 50: On a day when the Red Storm honored ten of their all-time greats at halftime, Lamont Hamilton matches his career high with 24 points and leads them to an upset of the previously unbeaten Panthers. (ESPN) This leaves two unbeaten teams in men's Division I basketball...
  - Georgetown 87, (1) Duke 84 ...make that one. The Blue Devils' normally vaunted defense fails to show up at the MCI Center, as the Hoyas shoot 61 percent from the field, build a double-digit lead well into the second half, and survive a Duke comeback. Brandon Bowman leads the Hoyas with 23 points. J. J. Redick scores 41 in a losing effort, but Shelden Williams only scores 4 for the Blue Devils. (ESPN) This left only one team unbeaten...
  - Tennessee 80, (2) Florida 76: ...until later that day, when Chris Lofton's 29 points lead the Volunteers to a home upset of the Gators. Even with all three unbeatens going down, one could argue that none of them were the biggest upset of the day...
  - North Dakota State 62, (15) Wisconsin 55: ... rather, this may be. The Bison, in their first year playing a full Division I schedule, shock the Badgers at their normal fortress home court, the Kohl Center. The Badgers shoot 22.2% from the field.
  - (3) UConn 71, (15) Louisville 58: With the top two teams going down, the Huskies avoided the upset bug on the Cardinals' home floor, thanks to Maurice Williams' 15 points and Rudy Gay's 12 points. When the new polls are released on Monday (January 23), Connecticut will likely rise to number one (which they did).
  - (11) Michigan State 85, (23) Iowa 55: Maurice Ager, Paul Davis, and Shannon Brown score 25, 19, and 17 respectively to lead the Spartans to the most lopsided win in their series against the Hawkeyes.
  - (12) West Virginia 60, (18) UCLA 56: Behind Mike Gansey's 24 points, the Mountaineers go to Pauley Pavilion, build a 20-point lead early in the second half, and survive a ferocious Bruins comeback, despite scoring only one field goal (a key Gansey three-pointer) in the final 14:43.
  - Houston coach Tom Penders collapses before half-time during the team's 82–79 loss to UAB and is given a technical foul. Penders recovers and coaches during the second half, blaming his collapse on a heart condition. Conference USA officials refuse to rescind the technical foul, and were disciplined several days later. aol.com
- Boxing:
  - Manny Pacquiao defeats Erik Morales by a tenth-round knockout in the first ever boxing undercard at the Wynn Hotel and Casino in Las Vegas, Nevada, avenging an earlier defeat to Morales. In the evening's only world title bout, Martín Castillo retained his World Boxing Association Super Flyweight title, after recovering from a first round knockdown, by a twelve-round split decision in his rematch with former world champion Alexander Muñoz. DailyNews.com

== 20 January 2006 (Friday) ==
- Football:
  - 2006 African Cup of Nations opening match:
    - Group A: Egypt 3–0 Libya
  - English football:
    - The Premiership formally charges Portsmouth with "tapping up" current manager Harry Redknapp. They accuse Pompey of making an improper approach to Redknapp while he was under contract to archrivals Southampton.
- NFL Non-Postseason News: The St. Louis Rams have named Miami Dolphins offensive coordinator Scott Linehan to be their new coach.

== 19 January 2006 (Thursday) ==
- NBA: New York Knicks forward and president of the Players Association Antonio Davis was suspended by the league for five games for going into the stands during the Knicks game against the Chicago Bulls to protect his wife from a drunken heckler.
- NFL Non-Postseason News: The Detroit Lions have hired Tampa Bay Buccaneers line coach Rod Marinelli as their new head coach.
- NCAA Women's College Basketball: Tennessee coach Pat Summitt won her 900th game as coach of the Lady Volunteers, defeating the Lady Commodores of Vanderbilt, 80–68.
- NHL:
  - Columbus Blue Jackets defenseman Bryan Berard was suspended two years from international hockey after failing a drug test. No word on if he will be suspended by the NHL.
  - Mario Lemieux is planning to sell the Pittsburgh Penguins, and reports are if they do not get a new arena by June 2008, the team may move out of the Steel City.
- Major League Baseball: Former Boston Red Sox General Manager Theo Epstein, who turned down a contract extension and avoided the media on Halloween by wearing a gorilla suit out of the team offices at Fenway Park, will return to his old job as the team's general manager.

== 18 January 2006 (Wednesday) ==
- Cricket: Zimbabwe Cricket announces that the Zimbabwean cricket team will not play Test cricket in 2006
- Football:
  - FA Cup third round replays
    - Manchester United 5–0 Burton Albion: Talented teenager Giuseppe Rossi doubles his tally of senior goals for the season to four.
    - Everton 1–0 Millwall (BBC)
  - Women's football: Kristine Lilly becomes the first player in history, male or female, to reach 300 international appearances. She scores the opening goal and assists on the second as the USA defeats longtime rival Norway 3–1 in the Four Nations Tournament in Guangzhou.

== 17 January 2006 (Tuesday) ==
- Football: FA Cup third round replays
  - Birmingham 2–0 Torquay
  - Chester 0–1 Cheltenham
  - Leeds United 3–3 Wigan (aet). Wigan win 4–2 on penalties.
  - Middlesbrough 5–2 Nuneaton
  - Reading 3–2 West Bromwich Albion (aet).
  - Tamworth 1–1 Stoke (aet). Stoke win 5–4 on penalties
  - Walsall 2–0 Barnsley (BBC)
- NFL (Non-Post-season news)
  - The New York Jets hire New England Patriots defensive coordinator Eric Mangini as their new head coach. At age 35, Mangini becomes the youngest of the current head coaches.
  - Sean Payton, former offensive coordinator of the Dallas Cowboys, was named the head coach of the New Orleans Saints.

== January 16, 2006 (Monday) ==
- Australian Open: Venus Williams loses to Bulgaria's 94th-seeded Tszvetana Pironkova in the first round, 2–6, 6–0, 9–7. (forbes.com)

== 15 January 2006 (Sunday) ==
- NFL Playoffs, Division Playoffs
  - AFC: Pittsburgh Steelers 21 Indianapolis Colts 18: In one of the NFL's biggest upsets ever, a furious Colts comeback ends when Mike Vanderjagt shanks a 46-yard field goal in the last fifteen seconds. The Steelers sack Peyton Manning five times, and will travel to Denver for next week's AFC Championship Game against the Broncos. (NFL.com)
  - NFC: Carolina Panthers 29, Chicago Bears 21: The Panthers punched their ticket to the NFC Championship Game in Seattle next week against the Seahawks thanks to Jake Delhomme's three touchdown passes, two to Steve Smith, who had 12 catches for 218 yards. (Yahoo! Sports/AP)
- Basketball: The draw for the groups of the 2006 World Championship takes place in Tokyo. The Olympic Champion Argentina team is drawn into Group A, Japan in Group B, and the United States will face 2008 Olympic host China in Group D competition.
- Road running: At the Rock 'n' Roll Half Marathon in Arizona, Haile Gebrselassie shatters the world record for the half-marathon, with a time of 58 minutes 55 seconds, breaking the previous mark by 21 seconds. (The Telegraph)

== 14 January 2006 (Saturday) ==
- Figure skating:
  - U.S. Figure Skating Championships: Johnny Weir wins his third consecutive gold medal in the men's competition, easily securing a spot for the 2006 Winter Olympics. Evan Lysacek, the current World bronze medalist, wins silver, while Matt Savoie finishes third. This will be the first Olympics for all three men. Meanwhile, on the women's side, Sasha Cohen gets her first national title, while Kimmie Meissner wins silver, and Emily Hughes, sister of reigning Olympic champion Sarah Hughes, wins bronze. Cohen and Meissner will go to Torino, but Hughes is named an alternate after Michelle Kwan, who withdrew from these Championships with a groin injury, successfully petitions for a spot on the Olympic team. (USFSA.org)
- NFL Playoffs, Division Playoffs
  - NFC: Seattle Seahawks 20, Washington Redskins 10: Shaun Alexander leaves early with a concussion, but the Seahawks hold on thanks to a terrific all-around performance. Darrell Jackson catches nine passes for 143 yards and a touchdown. The Seahawks will host the Carolina Panthers next Sunday in the NFC Championship Game. (NFL.com)
  - AFC: Denver Broncos 27, New England Patriots 13: The Patriots' bid for a third-straight championship ended as New England commits five costly turnovers, four of which led to 24 Denver points, advancing them to host next week's AFC Championship Game against the Pittsburgh Steelers. Tom Brady threw for 341 yards in the loss, his first as a pro quarterback in post-season. (NFL.com)
- NCAA Men's College Basketball
  - (8) Texas 58, (3) Villanova 55: In a low-scoring battle of Top 10 teams, neither shoots well, but the Longhorns manage to put three more points up than the Wildcats, with the help of LaMarcus Aldridge, who had 19. 'Nova, who have now lost two of their last three, shot 27 percent from the field in the loss, and fall to 11–2. Texas improves to 14–2.
  - (13) Washington 69, (11) UCLA 65: In a battle of the top two Pac-10 teams in the country, the Huskies have a monster second half, and win by four points. The Bruins, who were up 12 at halftime, fall to 14–3. Washington goes to 14–2.

== 13 January 2006 (Friday) ==
- NBA: Philadelphia 76ers 125, Boston Celtics 124 (3 OT): In the longest game in the NBA this season (three overtimes and three hours, 43 minutes playing time), Kyle Korver sent the game into a third overtime with a buzzer-beating three-point basket and Chris Webber, who failed to call a time out with seconds remaining in that overtime period, in a reversal of the incident in the 1993 NCAA Championship Game while at Michigan against North Carolina, hit two free throws to give the home team the win.
- NHL: The Montreal Canadiens fire Claude Julien as head coach and name general manager Bob Gainey as his interim replacement.
- Ski jumping: During the first day of the two-day individual event at the Ski Flying World Championships in the Kulm jump in Styria, the defending champion Roar Ljøkelsøy of Norway leaps 207.5 metres in the second jump to take a lead of 22.8 points over second-placed Thomas Morgenstern. The start was initially delayed for an hour due to windy conditions. (AP)

== 12 January 2006 (Thursday) ==
- NFL (Non-Post-season News)
  - One week after announcing that Marv Levy was returning to the Buffalo Bills as the team's new president and the subsequent firing of Tom Donahoe, head coach Mike Mularkey resigned.
  - The Green Bay Packers named former San Francisco 49ers offensive coordinator Mike McCarthy as their new head coach.
- NBA
  - Los Angeles Lakers 99, Cleveland Cavaliers 98: Kobe Bryant was "held" to 27 points, as the Lakers escaped with a win over LeBron James and the Cavs. King James had 28 points in the loss.
  - Detroit Pistons 83, San Antonio Spurs 68: Thanks to Rasheed Wallace's 27 points and ten rebounds, the Pistons completed the season sweep of their 2005 NBA Finals rematch.
- NHL: The league's Board of Governors (owners) and their Players' Association introduced a new drug testing policy, with punishments very similar to those in Major League Baseball, covering suspensions of 20 games for the first offense, 60 games for the second and a lifetime ban on the third offense.

== 11 January 2006 (Wednesday) ==
- Golf: New television contracts beginning in 2007 will have NBC, CBS and The Golf Channel televising PGA Tour events except for the four majors. The over-the-air networks will have six-year contracts, while The Golf Channel, owned by Comcast, will have a fifteen-year pact. NBC cable partner USA Network along with Disney's ABC and ESPN were shut out in the negotiations, with the Disney duo walking away.
- NFL: Southern California's two leading running backs, known as "Thunder and Lightning", are both leaving school, as LenDale White announces that he will forgo his senior season for the Trojans and enter the NFL draft. His backfield teammate, Heisman Trophy winner Reggie Bush, did the same Thursday (January 12), and is expected to be the number one pick overall by the Houston Texans.

== 10 January 2006 (Tuesday) ==
- Major League Baseball: Bruce Sutter is elected to the Baseball Hall of Fame by the Baseball Writers' Association of America.
- Rugby Union: On appeal, the International Rugby Board reduces its previously issued ban on Wales and Ospreys centre Gavin Henson by three weeks. On 23 December 2005, a disciplinary panel originally banned him for 10 weeks and 2 days after finding him guilty of elbowing Leicester prop Alex Moreno in the face; the assault left Moreno with a broken nose. Henson will now be available for the third round of the Six Nations Championship against Ireland. BBC

== 9 January 2006 (Monday) ==
- Paris Dakar Rally: Australian KTM motorcycle rider Andy Caldecott, 41, dies in Mauritania during the ninth stage of the rally, becoming the 23rd competitor to die during the event. Caldecott suffered fatal neck injuries during a crash, but the causes of the crash are not known. (ABC.net)

== 8 January 2006 (Sunday) ==
- NCAA College Football: Texas quarterback Vince Young announces he will forgo his senior year to enter the 2006 NFL draft.
- Golf: PGA Tour:
  - Stuart Appleby wins the Mercedes Championships for the third consecutive year, defeating Vijay Singh on the first hole of a sudden-death playoff. Both Appleby and Singh shot 8-under during the regulation 72 holes. Appleby is the first player on Tour to win an event three consecutive years since Tiger Woods won four straight Bay Hill Invitationals from 2000 to 2003. (PGATour.com)
- Football: FA Cup, Third round
  - Burton Albion 0–0 Manchester United: Conference side Burton Albion earn a lucrative replay at Old Trafford against their august visitors from four divisions higher in the English League system.
  - Fulham 1–2 Leyton Orient: Premiership side Fulham crash out to League Two minnows Orient, from three divisions below them.
  - Leicester City 3–2 Tottenham Hotspur: Championship side Leicester recover from a two-goal deficit with a last-minute winner against their Premiership guests.
  - Sunderland 3–0 Northwich Victoria
- NFL playoffs Wild Card Weekend
  - NFC: Carolina Panthers 23 New York Giants 0: The Panthers hold the Giants to 132 yards from scrimmage and intercept three Eli Manning passes. Carolina will play "Da Bears" in Chicago next week.
  - AFC: Pittsburgh Steelers 31 Cincinnati Bengals 17: Ben Roethlisberger throws for three touchdowns, while Jon Kitna, who entered after a first-quarter injury to Carson Palmer, throws two costly interceptions for the Bengals. The Steelers travel to Indianapolis next week and face the top-seeded Colts.
- NCAA Men's College Basketball:
  - (24) West Virginia 91, (3) Villanova 87: The Mountaineers, behind 20-plus point efforts from Joe Herber, Kevin Pittsnogle, and Mike Gansey, come back from a 15-point second-half deficit on the road to hand the Wildcats their first loss of the season.
  - Wisconsin 82, (7) Michigan State 63: Kammron Taylor ties a career-high with 27 points, and the Badgers defense holds Spartans stars Maurice Ager and Paul Davis to 11 and 2 points respectively. The Badgers go to 33–1 in Big Ten home games under coach Bo Ryan.
  - Georgia Tech 60, (11) Boston College 58: The Yellow Jackets' Zam Fredrick sinks a tie-breaking three-pointer with 33.5 seconds left, and they hold on for the home win. The Eagles shoot 4-for-16 from three-point range, and go more than 11 minutes of the game without a field goal.
  - (1) Duke 82, (23) Wake Forest 64: The unbeaten Blue Devils easily avoid the upset bug on the road thanks to 32 points from J. J. Redick, his fifth 30-plus performance of the season.

== 7 January 2006 (Saturday) ==
- NCAA Men's College Basketball
  - Kansas 73, (19) Kentucky 46: In the Wildcats' first visit to Allen Fieldhouse since being blown out by a 150–95 score on December 9, 1989, the Jayhawks hand Tubby Smith his worst loss as UK coach.
  - Iowa 63, (6) Illinois 48: The Illini will not go unbeaten through the regular season as the Hawkeyes hand them their first loss since last April's NCAA Championship to North Carolina in St. Louis.
  - Washington State 78, (10) Washington 71: Josh Akognon makes a tie-breaking three-pointer with 16 seconds left and finishes with a career-high 27 points to lead the Cougars to their first road win ever over a Top 10 team. The Huskies lose their second straight home game, after having had the longest home winning streak in men's Division I basketball broken last week by Arizona.
  - (16) Indiana 81, (18) Ohio State 79: Another unbeaten goes down for the first time, along with the Illini, as the Buckeyes lose to the Hoosiers in Indiana.
  - (25) North Carolina 82, (13) NC State 69: The Wolfpack fall to 12–2 as they get beaten by Tyler Hansbrough and the Tar Heels by 13. Hansbrough had 20 points as UNC goes to 9–2.
- NCAA Women's College Basketball
  - (1) Tennessee 89, (7) UConn 80: In front of an NCAA record crowd for a regular-season women's game, Sidney Spencer scores a career-high 21 points to pace the Lady Vols to the win. Four other Lady Vols, including Candace Parker, score in double figures, and Alexis Hornbuckle misses becoming the first Lady Vol ever to record a triple-double by one assist.
- Football: FA Cup, Third round: The big teams of the Premiership and the Coca-Cola Championship join the smaller clubs which have been contesting the trophy since August. Remaining fixtures are played tomorrow.
  - Arsenal 2–1 Cardiff City
  - Barnsley 1–1 Walsall
  - Blackburn 3–0 QPR
  - Brighton 0–1 Coventry
  - Chelsea 2–1 Huddersfield
  - Cheltenham 2–2 Chester
  - Crystal Palace 4–1 Northampton
  - Derby 2–1 Burnley
  - Hull 0–1 Aston Villa
  - Ipswich 0–1 Portsmouth
  - Luton 3–5 Liverpool : In one of the most pulsating Third Round matches in years, Liverpool live up to their reputation as the comeback kings, recovering from 3–1 down early in the second half (Liverpool having missed a Djibril Cissé penalty, and Luton scoring from the spot) with substitute Florent Sinama Pongolle scoring two goals and Xabi Alonso scoring two including a last-minute goal from his own half while Luton's goalkeeper was still in Liverpools' half from a last-gasp equaliser attempt – winning one Liverpool fan who last August had bet £200 at 125–1 that he would do the feat this season £25,000. (Reuters)
  - Manchester City 3–1 Scunthorpe
  - Millwall 1–1 Everton
  - Newcastle 1–0 Mansfield
  - Norwich 1–2 West Ham
  - Nuneaton 1–1 Middlesbrough
  - Port Vale 2–1 Doncaster
  - Preston 2–1 Crewe
  - Sheffield United 1–2 Colchester
  - Sheffield Wednesday 2–4 Charlton
  - Southampton 4–3 MK Dons
  - Stockport 2–3 Brentford
  - Stoke 0–0 Tamworth
  - Torquay 0–0 Birmingham
  - Watford 0–3 Bolton
  - West Bromwich Albion 1–1 Reading
  - Wigan 1–1 Leeds United
  - Wolves 1–0 Plymouth
- NFL Playoffs, Wild Card Weekend:
  - NFC: Washington Redskins 17, Tampa Bay Buccaneers 10: The Redskins gain only a playoff-low 120 yards from scrimmage but win on the Bucs' home field thanks to key takeaways and defensive stops in Joe Gibbs' first post-season win since Super Bowl XXVI and a measure of revenge for a Week Ten loss in that same stadium. The Redskins will play at Seattle next week against the Seahawks. Safety Sean Taylor was ejected for spitting on Bucs' RB Michael Pittman, and was fined $17,000 (US), the entire game paycheck for that incident two days later.
  - AFC: New England Patriots 28, Jacksonville Jaguars 3: On their home field, The Patriots win their league-record tenth-straight postseason game. Tom Brady throws three touchdown passes, Asante Samuel returned a Byron Leftwich interception 73 yards for the other score. Willie McGinest sets a playoff record with 4.5 sacks. The Pats will play the Broncos at Denver next Saturday.

== 6 January 2006 (Friday) ==
- NFL:
  - Philadelphia Eagles offensive coordinator Brad Childress was named as the new head coach of the Minnesota Vikings, five days after the firing of Mike Tice.
  - The New York Jets and Kansas City Chiefs have made a deal that will allow Herman Edwards to become the Chiefs' new coach in exchange for sending the Jets a fourth-round draft pick as compensation. On Sunday (January 8), an agreement was in place for a four-year contract between the Chiefs and Edwards.
- Ski jumping:
  - Four Hills Tournament: Janne Ahonen wins the fourth and final event of the Tournament at Bischofshofen 2.0 points ahead of Czech Jakub Janda, and the two finish level on overall points with 1,081.5 and share the title for the first time in the tournament's 54-year history. Ahonen was 1.0 points behind Janda after the first jump, but the Finn jumped 141.5 metres in the second jump, 2.5 metres longer than Janda. This was Ahonen's fourth Four Hills overall win, to equal a record set by Jens Weißflog in 1991.'(Reuters Canada)

== 5 January 2006 (Thursday) ==
- NCAA Men's College Basketball
  - (3) Villanova 76, (8) Louisville 67: In a matchup of top ten teams, the unbeaten Wildcats, and the 1-loss Cardinals, 'Nova is able to pour on more offense in both halves and win by nine, forcing Louisville to lose their first Big East game ever and go to 11–2. Randy Foye has 24 points and the Wildcats improve to 10–0, their best start since the 1960s.
  - (6) Illinois 60, (7) Michigan State 50: In another Top 10 matchup and another chance for an unbeaten team to fall, Dee Brown comes up with 34 points to lead the Fighting Illini to victory over Tom Izzo and the Spartans. Brown was 12-for-22 from the field on a night that some think proved that he can lead the Illini to another final. Illinois improves the best record in the country to 15–0, while MSU falls to 12–3, having played a very tough schedule thus far.
- Ice hockey: 2006 World Junior Ice Hockey Championships: Canada beats Russia 5–0 in the gold medal game to win their second straight World Junior Title. Canada coach Brent Sutter becomes 12–0 at the Juniors, becoming the winningest Canadian coach in history. However, the game was not without controversy, as a Russian goal was disallowed in the second period that would have made the score 2–1. Meanwhile, the heavily favored Americans lost to Finland 4–2 in the bronze medal game. (TSN.ca)

== 4 January 2006 (Wednesday) ==
- NCAA College Football: Bowl Championship Series National Championship Game
  - Rose Bowl Game presented by citi: (2) Texas 41, (1) Southern California 38: The Big 12 champion Longhorns win their first national championship since 1970. Longhorns QB Vince Young, runner up to the Trojans' Reggie Bush in the Heisman Trophy balloting, runs for 200 of his game-record 467 total offensive yards, including the game-winning touchdown with a 9-yard dash on 4th and 5 with 19 seconds left. The Longhorns win their 20th straight game, while the Trojans lose for the first time in 35 games, handing Matt Leinart his second – and final – collegiate loss.
- Indy Racing League: With over two months left until the IndyCar Series season opener on March 26 at the Homestead-Miami Speedway, Toyota announces they will not supply engines for the series this year, leaving Honda as the IRL's lone engine supplier. So far, sixteen cars have been confirmed to be taking part in the upcoming season.'(Autoweek)
- Figure skating: Michelle Kwan will skip the United States Figure Skating championships in St. Louis, Missouri, this month and will instead petition to join the team in Turin, Italy for the XX Olympic Winter Games due to a right groin injury she suffered while practicing. Though the petition would be successful, Michelle would be forced to retire from figure skating on the second day of the Olympics, due to that groin injury.
- Ski jumping:
  - Four Hills Tournament: In the third event of the Four Hills, Lars Bystøl of Norway comes back from 28th and 20th placings in the first two events to top the rankings in Innsbruck with 264.7pts. The Czech Jakub Janda takes over the overall lead in the Four Hills after finishing in second place 1.5 points behind Bystøl, while Bjørn Einar Romøren ensures that Norway have two men on the podium. Finn Janne Ahonen, who led the tournament before this event, finishes sixth. (NRK.no (in Norwegian))

== 3 January 2006 (Tuesday) ==
- NCAA Men's College Basketball: Marquette 94, (2) UConn 79: Steve Novak's 41 points led the Golden Eagles to a home court upset of the second-ranked Huskies in their Big East debut.
- NFL: Another head coach was dismissed as Norv Turner was given the pink slip by the Oakland Raiders.
- NCAA College Football: Bowl Championship Series
  - FedEx Orange Bowl: Penn State 26, Florida State 23 (3 OT): Freshman placekicker Kevin Kelly ended the longest BCS game ever with a walkoff 29-yard field goal at 12:59 AM US EST to lead the Big Ten co-champion Nittany Lions to a victory over the ACC champion Seminoles as Joe Paterno won his 21st bowl game, his first over Bobby Bowden in their first meeting since the 1990 Blockbuster Bowl. During the post-game trophy ceremony, JoePa, ever with the dry humor about the long night, asked an Orange Bowl official "How long have we been here, three months?"

== 2 January 2006 (Monday) ==
- NCAA College Football
  - Non-BCS Games
    - AT&T Cotton Bowl Classic: Alabama 13, Texas Tech 10: A 46-yard field goal by Jamie Christensen as time expires gives the SEC's Crimson Tide the win over the Big 12's Red Raiders, the first walkoff score since Joe Montana led Notre Dame to a comeback win over Houston in the 1979 game.
    - Outback Bowl: Florida 31, Iowa 24: The SEC Gators withstand a fourth-quarter rally by the Hawkeyes from the Big Ten thanks to a blown call of offsides on an on-side kick by Iowa late in the game when replays showed no member of the kickoff team actually crossed the thirty-five yard line after the ball was kicked. The Gators recovered the ensuing attempt, and ran out the clock.
    - Toyota Gator Bowl: Virginia Tech 35, Louisville 24: The ACC's Hokies, former members of the Big East, come back from a 24–21 deficit to beat the latter conference's Cardinals.
    - Capital One Bowl: Wisconsin 24, Auburn 10: The Big Ten wins its first bowl game of the year in Barry Alvarez' last game as head coach over the SEC Tigers.
  - Bowl Championship Series
    - Tostitos Fiesta Bowl: Ohio State 34, Notre Dame 20: The Big Ten's Buckeyes put up 604 total yards on the independent Fighting Irish; Troy Smith throws for 340 yards and rushes for 68.
    - At the Georgia Dome in Atlanta: Nokia Sugar Bowl: West Virginia 38 Georgia 35: The Big East champions finally avoided a conference-wide shutout in bowl games by upsetting the SEC Champions.

== 1 January 2006 (Sunday) ==
- NFL Week 17: The NFL Playoff picture was finally set in stone on the first day of the New Year.
  - Indianapolis Colts 17, Arizona Cardinals 13: In Tony Dungy's first game since his son James' death, Indianapolis wins despite resting its star players and the Cards' Neil Rackers breaks the NFL record for field goals in a season with his 40th. An apparent touchdown that would have given the Cards a lead late in the fourth quarter by Cards' QB Josh McCown on fourth and goal from the Colts one was overturned by the replay official as the replay showed that McCown fumbling the ball before crossing the goal line.
  - Cleveland Browns 20, Baltimore Ravens 16: Antonio Bryant catches nine passes for 123 yards and a touchdown and Dennis Northcutt provides the winning score on a punt return. Ravens' DB Deion Sanders played in his final NFL game, announcing his retirement after the game.
  - New York Jets 30, Buffalo Bills 26: Justin Miller returns a kickoff 95 yards for a touchdown in the fourth quarter of the Jets' fourth win of the season, their worst since the 1–15 record posted by Rich Kotite in 1996, and will select fourth in the 2006 NFL draft April 29 in New York City. The win sent coach Herman Edwards out on a high note, as he would become the Kansas City Chiefs' new head coach a week later in exchange for the Chiefs' fourth-round pick in said draft.
  - Carolina Panthers 44 Atlanta Falcons 11: DeShawn Foster outrushes the entire Falcons team (165 yards compared to the Falcons' team total of 26), and Jake Delhomme throws two touchdown passes — one of them to Steve Smith, who was the NFL's receiving leader with 1,563 yards — as the Panthers clinch a playoff spot. Smith ties Arizona's Larry Fitzgerald for the most passes caught with 103 during the regular season.
  - Kansas City Chiefs 37, Cincinnati Bengals 3: The Chiefs put up 537 total yards on the Bengals, including 201 on the ground from Larry Johnson, but miss out on the playoffs due to the Steelers' win. After the game, Chiefs coach Dick Vermeil announced his second — and likely permanent — retirement.
  - Pittsburgh Steelers 35, Detroit Lions 31: Pittsburgh clinches the final AFC playoff spot as Jerome Bettis rushes for three touchdowns in what likely could be his final game at Heinz Field.
  - Miami Dolphins 28, New England Patriots 26: While most of the Patriots starters — including the league's leading passer, Tom Brady with 4,110 total yards — were resting or played in limited action before next week's playoff game with Jacksonville, Doug Flutie capped off his career by making the NFL's first successful drop kick since Ray McLain did for the Chicago Bears on December 21, 1941, during their 37–9 NFL Championship Game victory over the New York Giants. According to the Pro Football Hall of Fame's website, the kick was also the first successful drop kick in a regular season game since Earl "Dutch" Clark did it in 1937 for the Detroit Lions.
  - Tampa Bay Buccaneers 27, New Orleans Saints 13: Dewayne White's late fumble return for a touchdown clinches the NFC South division title for Tampa Bay. Meanwhile, the Saints will pick second at the draft, and also sacked coach Jim Haslett due a power struggle the following day.
  - Green Bay Packers 23, Seattle Seahawks 17: Shaun Alexander sets a new league record with his 28th touchdown of the season while winning the NFL's rushing title with 1,880 yards. Meanwhile, Brett Favre throws a touchdown pass — the 396th of his career — in what is likely to be his final game. The Pack will hold the fifth selection in the draft, but will have a new coach as Mike Sherman was dismissed the following day.
  - San Francisco 49ers 20, Houston Texans 17 (OT): The 49ers' Joe Nedney kicks a 33-yard field goal with 3:52 left in overtime, giving the Texans the first choice in the 2006 NFL Draft, while the Niners will pick sixth. The Texans would fire coach Dom Capers the next day.
  - Jacksonville Jaguars 40, Tennessee Titans 13: Backup quarterback Quinn Gray throws two touchdowns for the Jaguars, who rest several starters, while the Titans will select third in the draft thanks to a strength of schedule tiebreaker.
  - Minnesota Vikings 34, Chicago Bears 10: In Mike Tice's last game as Vikings head coach, he goes out a winner thanks to two Brad Johnson touchdown passes while Da Bears rested many of their regulars. Tice was informed by new Vikings owner Zygi Wilf that he was fired one hour following the contest.
  - Washington Redskins 31, Philadelphia Eagles 20: The Redskins victory clinches the final playoff spot in the NFC as Clinton Portis rushes for 124 yards and two touchdowns. The Eagles also made history — in a double negative way — by becoming the first team since the 2002 expansion to go unbeaten (6–0) in divisional play one year (in 2004) to going winless (0–6) the next year and the first in history to do just that.
  - St. Louis Rams 20, Dallas Cowboys 10: Any playoff drama for Dallas was sucked out with the Redskins' victory, and it showed in the second half for the Cowboys, who blew a 10–7 halftime lead. The game was ESPN's final Sunday Night Football telecast after nineteen seasons, the last eight as a full-season package. NBC will take over the package starting with the 2006 season, renaming the games "Football Night in America." Mike Martz and his interim replacement, Joe Vitt, were fired as Rams' coaches the following day, and Cowboys' coach Bill Parcells, who had been reported ready to step down signed a two-year contract extension that Friday (January 6).
- Ski jumping:
  - Four Hills Tournament: The Czech Jakub Janda wins his fifth World Cup event of the season in the New Year Ski Jump in Garmisch-Partenkirchen, Germany, 1.9 points ahead of Finn Janne Ahonen, who nevertheless retains his overall lead in the Tournament, 5.8 points ahead of Janda. (CBC.ca).
