= November 2005 in sports =

| << | November 2005 | | | | | >> |
| Su | Mo | Tu | We | Th | Fr | Sa |
| | | 1 | 2 | 3 | 4 | 5 |
| 6 | 7 | 8 | 9 | 10 | 11 | 12 |
| 13 | 14 | 15 | 16 | 17 | 18 | 19 |
| 20 | 21 | 22 | 23 | 24 | 25 | 26 |
| 27 | 28 | 29 | 30 |
India; Sports

This list shows notable sports-related deaths, events, and notable outcomes that occurred in November of 2005.

== Deaths ==
- 29 Vic Power
- 25 George Best
- 25 Richard Burns
- 16 Sandy Consuegra
- 15 Robert Tisch
- 10 Steve Courson

== Ongoing events ==
- Football (soccer) 2005–06:
  - England: Premier League; England (general)
  - Scotland; Sweden; France: Ligue 1
  - UEFA Champions League; UEFA Cup
  - Australia: Hyundai A-League
- Rugby union 2005–06: Heineken Cup
- U.S. and Canadian sports 2005(−06):
  - NFL; NHL; NBA
- Cricket tours:
  - 25 October–22 December: Sri Lanka tour of India
  - 12 November–21 December: England tour of Pakistan
- Multi-sport events:
  - 27 November–5 December: 23rd Southeast Asian Games;
    in The Philippines
- Winter sports:
  - 29 November–4 December: Alpine skiing World Cup races
    in Beaver Creek, Colorado, United States (Men);
    in Lake Louise, Canada (Women)

== 30 November 2005 (Wednesday) ==
- Football: 2005–06 UEFA Cup: Group stage, matchday 4
  - Group A: Slavia Prague 0–2 AS Monaco
  - Group A: CSKA Sofia 2–0 Viking Stavanger
  - Group B: Brøndby 1–1 Espanyol
  - Group B: Maccabi Petach Tikva 0–4 Lokomotiv Moscow
  - Group C: Sampdoria 0–0 Hertha Berlin
  - Group C: Steaua Bucharest 3–0 Halmstad
  - Group D: Grasshoppers 2–3 Dnipro Dnipropetrovsk
  - Group D: Litex Lovech 0–2 AZ Alkmaar
  - See also 2005–06 UEFA Cup.

== 28 November 2005 (Monday) ==
- NFL:
  - Steve Mariucci was fired as head coach of the Detroit Lions along with two offensive assistants, and defensive coordinator Dick Jauron was named as interim coach for the remainder of the 2005 season, three days after reports from the Detroit Free Press and WJBK-TV.
  - Monday Night Football
    - Indianapolis Colts 26, Pittsburgh Steelers 7: The Colts' Peyton Manning hits his favorite receiver, Marvin Harrison, for an 80-yard touchdown on the Colts' first play from scrimmage, and they never look back as they go to 11–0. The Colts defense holds the Steelers to 197 total yards.

== 27 November 2005 (Sunday) ==
- The 23rd Southeast Asian Games (SEA Games) formally opens in Manila, Philippines. (Philippine Daily Inquirer)
- Rugby union: The sport's governing body, the International Rugby Board, hands out its annual awards in Paris. The three major awards are swept by New Zealand. Dan Carter is named Player of the Year, the All Blacks are named Team of the Year, and their coach Graham Henry is Coach of the Year. (IRB.com)
- Golf: Fred Funk won a total of $925,000 (US) and fifteen skins in the annual Skins Game event in La Quinta, California. Defending champion Fred Couples, who has won more money than anyone else in the event's history, giving him the nickname "Mr. Skins", is shut out, along with Annika Sörenstam, the latter for the second straight year. Tiger Woods, winner of three skins and $75,000 on Day One, was second.
- Canadian Football League: 93rd Grey Cup at Vancouver
  - Edmonton Eskimos 38, Montreal Alouettes 35 (2OT): Ricky Ray wins Most Valuable Player honours for a 36-for-44, 367-yard performance in the second Grey Cup to go to overtime.
- NFL Week 12
  - Cincinnati Bengals 42, Baltimore Ravens 29: Carson Palmer throws for 302 yards and three touchdowns in a prelude to the big Bengals-Steelers game next week.
  - Carolina Panthers 13, Buffalo Bills 9: Jake Delhomme breaks open a defensive battle with a touchdown pass to Michael Gaines with under three minutes remaining.
  - Chicago Bears 13, Tampa Bay Buccaneers 10: The Bears' defense holds an opponent to 10 or fewer points for the eighth time this season as Chicago wins its seventh-straight game.
  - Minnesota Vikings 24, Cleveland Browns 12: All three of Marcus Robinson's receptions go for touchdowns as the Vikings take advantage of five Cleveland turnovers.
  - Kansas City Chiefs 26, New England Patriots 16: Tom Brady throws four interceptions — three to Greg Wesley — and Lawrence Tynes ties the NFL record for field goals in a quarter with four in the second period.
  - San Diego Chargers 23, Washington Redskins 17 (OT): LaDainian Tomlinson rushes for 184 yards and three touchdowns, including a 32-yard touchdown run to tie the game and a 41-yard touchdown on the first play from scrimmage in overtime.
  - St. Louis Rams 33, Houston Texans 27 (OT): Houston led 27–17 with a minute left. But third-string quarterback Ryan Fitzpatrick throws a 43-yard touchdown to Isaac Bruce; the Rams recover an onside kick; Jeff Wilkins hits a 47-yard field goal; and Kevin Curtis catches a 56-yard touchdown pass from Fitzpatrick in overtime.
  - Tennessee Titans 33, San Francisco 49ers 22: Steve McNair throws for 343 yards and three third-quarter touchdowns.
  - Jacksonville Jaguars 24, Arizona Cardinals 17: The Jaguars lose Byron Leftwich to an ankle injury but win behind backup quarterback David Garrard.
  - Miami Dolphins 33, Oakland Raiders 21: Jason Taylor and Vonnie Holiday each record three sacks as the Dolphins hound Kerry Collins all day.
  - Philadelphia Eagles 19, Green Bay Packers 14: The Eagles break a four-game losing streak thanks to four David Akers field goals, including the 33-yard game-winner.
  - Seattle Seahawks 24, New York Giants 21 (OT): After Jay Feely misses three attempts at game-winning field goals, Josh Brown hits for the Seahawks from 36 yards. The Giants' Jeff Feagles sets an NFL record by appearing in his 283rd consecutive game.
  - New Orleans Saints 21, New York Jets 19: Mike Nugent kicks four field goals but misses what would have been the game-winner from 53 yards out in the final minute.

== 26 November 2005 (Saturday) ==
- NCAA College Football:
  - AP Top 25:
    - (5) Virginia Tech 30, North Carolina 3: The Hokies win and advance to the ACC championship against Florida State.
    - (6) Notre Dame 38, Stanford 31: The Irish win the last game at Stanford Stadium before an extreme makeover to reduce capacity and make it a more football-friendly facility, and become eligible for the BCS. Brady Quinn throws for 432 yards and three touchdown passes, two of them to Jeff Samardzija, and Darius Walker runs for 190 yards and the winning TD.
    - (10) Miami (FL) 25, Virginia 17
    - (13) Georgia 14, (20) Georgia Tech 7
    - Nevada 38, (16) Fresno State 35.
    - (17) Louisville 41, Syracuse 17: The Cardinals send the Orange crashing to their first 10-loss season in 110 years of football.
    - (19) Florida 34, (23) Florida State 7
  - Other notable games:
    - Kansas 24, Iowa State 21 (OT): The Cyclones' loss gives Colorado the Big 12 North title and a date against #2 Texas in the conference championship game on December 3 in Houston.
    - UConn 15, South Florida 10: The Bulls' loss, combined with West Virginia's win on Thursday, gives the Mountaineers the Big East Conference title and the league's BCS bid.
- Cricket: West Indies batsman Brian Lara completes an innings of 226 before he is bowled by Glenn McGrath in the final Test of the series against Australia, passing Allan Border's record of Test runs in the process to stand with a new Test record 11,187 runs. (Cricinfo)
- Sumo Wrestling: Asashoryu Akinori wins his eighty-third bout of the year and clinches the championship in the November basho (tournament), sweeping all six basho in 2005 and winning his seventh basho in a row. All are new records.
- Rugby union, November Tests
  - Scotland 10–29 New Zealand: Behind two tries from Rico Gear, the All Blacks complete their "Grand Slam" over all four Home Nations. This is the first Grand Slam since Australia pulled off the feat in 1984, and the first for the All Blacks since 1978. (BBC)
  - England 40–3 Manu Samoa
  - Ireland 43–12 Romania
  - Wales 24–22 Australia: Wales win a nail-biter over the Wallabies at Millennium Stadium, their first over the Wallabies since 1987. (BBC)
  - France 26–20 South Africa
  - Italy 23–8 Fiji

== 25 November 2005 (Friday) ==
- George Best, the Northern Irish international footballer who won the European Footballer of the Year award in 1968, has died of lung infection and organ failure at the age of 59.
- Cycling:
  - Roberto Heras faces a two-year ban from the sport after a Spanish laboratory confirmed that he had used the banned drug EPO at the 2005 Vuelta a España. Heras will be stripped of his victory at the Vuelta, with runner-up Denis Menchov elevated to first place. (BBC)
- NCAA College Football AP Top 25:
  - (2) Texas 40, Texas A&M 29: The 'Horns avoid an upset and will take on Big 12 North champion Colorado in Houston December 3, who got in the service entrance even though they lost to Nebraska, 30–3.
  - (3) LSU 19, Arkansas 17: The win by the Tigers clinched the SEC West title and a date with Georgia on December 3 in Atlanta.
  - (24) Wisconsin 41, Hawai'i 24: Wisconsin head coach Barry Alvarez' final regular season game as the coach of the Badgers was a success, thanks to Brian Calhoun's 133 yards rushing in the first half as part of a 149-yard performance.
- Cricket:
  - West Indies batsman Brian Lara becomes the second player in Test cricket history to score 11,000 runs, as he finishes the first day of the third Test against Australia at 202 not out, 11 runs behind the current Test record holder Allan Border. (Cricinfo)
  - South African tour of India: South Africa beats their hosts India by ten wickets at Eden Gardens after bowling them out for 188 – Shaun Pollock and Andrew Hall taking three wickets each, while a total of six maiden overs were bowled, four of them by Pollock. Graeme Smith then hits twenty fours and one six on the way to a career-best 134 not out as South Africa make 189 for no loss in 35.5 overs. (Cricinfo)

== 24 November 2005 (Thursday) ==
- NCAA College Football: AP Top 25
  - (12) West Virginia 45, Pittsburgh 13: In the Backyard Brawl, the Mountaineers rout the Panthers at home. WVU quarterback Pat White rushes for 220 yards and two touchdowns, and throws for a third, while Steve Slaton adds 179 yards and two TDs on the ground.
- NFL Thanksgiving Classics:
  - Atlanta Falcons 27, Detroit Lions 7: The Falcons ease past the Lions, thanks to two Michael Vick touchdown passes to Alge Crumpler and 116 yards rushing by Warrick Dunn.
  - Denver Broncos 24, Dallas Cowboys 21 (OT): Jason Elam's 24 yard field goal in OT, set up by a Ron Dayne 55 yard run, gave the Broncos the win in Irving, Texas.
- Football: 2005–06 UEFA Cup: Group stage, matchday 3
  - Group A: Viking Stavanger 2–2 Slavia Prague
  - Group A: AS Monaco 2–0 Hamburg
  - Group B: Espanyol 1–1 Palermo
  - Group C: Hertha Berlin 0–0 Lens
  - Group C: Halmstad 1–3 Sampdoria
  - Group D: AZ Alkmaar 0–0 Middlesbrough
  - Group D: Dnipro Dnipropetrovsk 0–2 Litex Lovech
  - Group E: Tromsø 3–1 Red Star Belgrade
  - Group E: Roma 1–1 Strasbourg
  - Group F: CSKA Moscow 2–1 Levski Sofia
  - Group F: Marseille 1–0 Heerenveen
  - Group G: PAOK 1–2 VfB Stuttgart
  - Group G: Shakhtar Donetsk 0–1 Rapid București: In a family fight, Shakhtar coach Mircea Lucescu meets his son, Rapid coach Razvan Lucescu.
  - Group H: Vitória Guimarães 1–1 Bolton Wanderers
  - Group H: Zenit St. Petersburg 2–1 Sevilla
  - See also 2005–06 UEFA Cup.

== 23 November 2005 (Wednesday) ==
- Football: 2005–06 UEFA Cup: Group stage, matchday 3
  - Group B: Lokomotiv Moscow 4–2 Brøndby: Brøndby suffer a backlash from Loko's disappointment at finishing third in the Russian Premier League last weekend, missing out on next year's Champions League.
  - See also 2005–06 UEFA Cup.
- Football: 2005–06 UEFA Champions League: Group stage, matchday 5
  - Group E: Fenerbahçe 0–4 A.C. Milan: Andriy Shevchenko scores all four of Milan's goals.
  - Group E: Schalke 04 3–0 PSV
  - Group F: Real Madrid 1–1 Lyon
  - Group F: Rosenborg 1–1 Olympiakos
  - Group G: Anderlecht 0–2 Chelsea
  - Group G: Liverpool 0–0 Real Betis
  - Group H: Porto 1–1 Rangers
  - Group H: Internazionale 4–0 Artmedia Bratislava
  - See also 2005–06 UEFA Champions League.

== 22 November 2005 (Tuesday) ==
- Major League Baseball: The Florida Marlins announced plans to move from Miami, Florida and out of Dolphins Stadium after the 2008 season due to a lack of progress for a baseball-only stadium in Miami-Dade County, Florida.
- Football: 2005–06 UEFA Champions League: Group stage, matchday 5
  - Group A: Bayern Munich 4–0 Rapid Vienna
  - Group A: Juventus 1–0 Club Brugge
  - Group B: Ajax 2–1 Sparta Prague
  - Group B: FC Thun 0–1 Arsenal
  - Group C: Panathinaikos 1–2 Udinese
  - Group C: FC Barcelona 3–1 Werder Bremen
  - Group D: Manchester United 0–0 Villarreal
  - Group D: Lille 0–0 Benfica
  - See also 2005–06 UEFA Champions League.
- College basketball
  - (8) Gonzaga 109, (12) Michigan State 103 (3 OT): In a triple-overtime classic, Maurice Ager scores a career-high 36 points for the Spartans, but is trumped by Adam Morrison's tournament-record 43 as the Zags go to 3–0 and advance to the finals of the Maui Invitational.

== 21 November 2005 (Monday) ==
- NHL: During a game between the Detroit Red Wings and the Nashville Predators, Red Wings star player Jiri Fischer collapses on the bench and suffers a seizure. The game is postponed. The Predators were leading 1–0 when the incident, which took place during the first period, occurred. (Yahoo!)
- NFL Monday Night Football
  - Minnesota Vikings 20, Green Bay Packers, 17: The Vikings win on a game-ending 27-yard field goal by Paul Edinger. The Vikes return an interception for a touchdown, and Mewelde Moore runs for 122 yards. In a losing effort, Brett Favre throws two TD passes to Donald Driver.
- College basketball
  - (2) Texas 76, (13) West Virginia 75: On the final play of the game with West Virginia down one point and 3.6 seconds to go with the ball, the ball is sent down floor to Mike Gansey (WVU), who is under the basket, but he is blocked by LaMarcus Aldridge and Texas survives in the Guardians Classic.
  - (3) UConn 77, Arkansas 68: Connecticut goes to 2–0 against unranked Arkansas who kept it close the entire game, but were never able to break through against UConn's defense. UConn will play Arizona in the 2nd round of the Maui Invitational.
  - (18) Iowa 67, (7) Kentucky 63: Behind a double-double from Greg Brunner (17 points, 12 rebounds) and a defense that harasses the Wildcats into 32-percent shooting from the field, the Hawkeyes advance to the final of the Guardians Classic against Texas. In a losing effort, Rekalin Sims leads all scorers with 22 points, and Rajon Rondo sets a tournament record with 19 rebounds.
  - (8) Gonzaga 88, (23) Maryland 76: Gonzaga goes to 2–0 with the help of Adam Morrison's 25 points. Gonzaga advances in the Maui Invitational and will face Michigan State on November 22. Maryland goes to 1–1.
  - (12) Michigan State 89, Chaminade 67: After a very close first half that appeared to be the beginning of another upset for Michigan State (who had just lost to Hawaii), the second half featured Shannon Brown and Maurice Ager took over for MSU to pull them away from Division II Chaminade.

== 20 November 2005 (Sunday) ==
- Canadian Football League Divisional Finals
  - Eastern Division: Montreal Alouettes 33, Toronto Argonauts 17: Eric Lapointe came off the bench to score three touchdowns in the second half to lead les Als to the upset of the Argos at Toronto.
  - Western Division: Edmonton Eskimos 28, BC Lions 23: Edmonton quarterback Ricky Ray led the team to a 21–3 lead, but backup Jason Maas scored the winning score and held on to the victory. The Eskimos will return to BC Place Stadium next Sunday (November 27) for the Grey Cup championship game against Montreal.
- NASCAR 2005 Chase for the NEXTEL Cup Ford 400: Greg Biffle edged Mark Martin by .017 second to win the race, leading a 1–2–3–4 sweep for Roush Racing, but Tony Stewart clinched his second Nextel Cup championship by finishing 15th, with a total of 6,533 points, thirty-five more points than Biffle (who will technically finish second because he won six races) and Carl Edwards. NASCAR.com
- NFL Week 11
  - Arizona Cardinals 38, St. Louis Rams 28: Kurt Warner's homecoming was a success for the Cardinals, throwing for three touchdowns in the win.
  - Chicago Bears 13, Carolina Panthers 3: Nathan Vasher, who had a 108-yard return of a missed field goal last week for a touchdown, intercepted two passes as "Da Bears" won their sixth straight contest.
  - Dallas Cowboys 20, Detroit Lions 7: Marion Barber's two touchdown runs made the Cowboys better prepared for their Thanksgiving Day classic with a win over the other Turkey Day hosts.
  - Jacksonville Jaguars 31, Tennessee Titans 28: Byron Leftwich threw for a career-high three touchdowns in the Jags' win in Nashville.
  - Cleveland Browns 22, Miami Dolphins 0: Reuben Droughns' 75-yard touchdown sprint, part of a 166 yard afternoon, led the Browns in a shutout of the Dolphins.
  - New England Patriots 24, New Orleans Saints 17: Tom Brady threw for three touchdowns, two ending drives of over 90 yards, but it was Eugene Wilson's late interception of Aaron Brooks' pass in the final minutes that sealed the win for the Pats.
  - Oakland Raiders 16, Washington Redskins 13: Sebastian Janikowski's 19-yard field goal with 1:08 gave Raiders' coach Norv Turner a measure of revenge against his old team.
  - New York Giants 27, Philadelphia Eagles 17: The Donovan McNabb and Terrell Owens-less Eagles fell thanks to three Eli Manning touchdown passes as the G-Men won their 600th game in franchise history.
  - Baltimore Ravens 16, Pittsburgh Steelers 13 (OT): Matt Stover's 44-yard field goal in OT gave the Ravens the win.
  - Tampa Bay Buccaneers 30, Atlanta Falcons 27: Once again, the Bucs became Michael Vick's nemesis as Derrick Brooks stripped Vick of the pigskin and Shelton Quarrels' recovers, then Matt Bryant hammers a 45-yard field goal to give the Bucs a major NFC South win.
  - Seattle Seahawks 27, San Francisco 49ers 25: The 'Hawks, led by Shaun Alexander's 115 yards, stretch their lead in the NFC West with a win by holding off the 49ers late in the contest.
  - San Diego Chargers 48, Buffalo Bills 10: On the day Lance Alworth's number 19 was retired by the Chargers, the Bolts brought out the familiar baby blue uniforms and Drew Brees made like John Hadl, throwing for 339 yards and four TDs.
  - Indianapolis Colts 45, Cincinnati Bengals 37: The Colts go to 10–0, thanks to Peyton Manning's two touchdown passes and Edgerrin James' two TD runs. The Steelers will come to the RCA Dome next Monday (November 28) to try and snap the Colts' winning streak.
  - Denver Broncos 27, New York Jets 0: Running back Mike Anderson ran for three touchdowns in the Orange Crush's shutout of the Jets, the first for the Jets since 1995.
  - Kansas City Chiefs 45, Houston Texans 17: Larry Johnson rushed for a club record 221 yards and two touchdowns as the Chiefs routed the homestanding Texans out of Reliant Stadium.
- Rugby union, November Tests:
  - France 43–8 Tonga
  - Scotland 18–11 Manu Samoa
- Speed skating: On the third and final day of the ISU World Cup meet in the Utah Olympic Oval, two more world records are broken, as Shani Davis beats the men's 1000 metre record with 1:07.03 and Cindy Klassen sets a 1500-metre record for women with a time of 1:51.79 — almost 1.5 seconds better than Anni Friesinger's previous record, set only minutes earlier during the same race (TSN.ca)

== 19 November 2005 (Saturday) ==
- NBA: The Dallas Mavericks ended the Detroit Pistons' season-opening eight-game winning streak with a 119–82 blowout of the defending Eastern Conference champions. Josh Howard led the Mavs with 26 points and Dirk Nowitzki added 23 in the blowout.
- Canadian football: Canadian Interuniversity Sport national semifinals:
  - Mitchell Bowl: (2) Saskatchewan Huskies 29, (1) Laval Rouge et Or 27: Laval missed a two-point conversion with 30 seconds left on the clock, giving Saskatchewan the victory. Saskatchewan advances to the Vanier Cup for the third time in four years, and avenge a Vanier Cup loss to Laval in 2004 by doing so. It is Laval's first loss in 19 games, dating back to last year.
  - Uteck Bowl: (3) Wilfrid Laurier Golden Hawks 31, (10) Acadia Axemen 10: Laurier quarterback Ryan Pyear throws four touchdown passes, three of them to receiver Bryon Hickey, in the victory. It is only the second time since Laurier changed its name from Waterloo Lutheran that the Golden Hawks advance to the Vanier Cup.
- NASCAR: Ted Musgrave wins the 2005 Craftsman Truck Series Championship, and Martin Truex Jr. wins his second straight Busch Series title after races in Homestead, Florida, the former after a rainout that was made up with an 8:40 AM US EST green flag.
- Rugby union, November Tests
  - England 19–23 New Zealand: The All Blacks stay on course for a potential "Grand Slam" over all four Home Nations, but must hold on as they play almost all of the last 24 minutes a man down, as three of their players are sin-binned in succession. (BBC)
  - Ireland 14–30 Australia: The Wallabies end their longest Test losing streak since 1969 at Lansdowne Road behind two tries from Drew Mitchell and 15 points from the boot of Mat Rogers. (BBC)
  - Italy 22–39 Argentina: Los Pumas claim their second Six Nations scalp in as many weeks.
  - Wales 16–33 South Africa: Bryan Habana scores two tries to lead the Springboks to victory in Cardiff. (BBC)
- NCAA College Football
  - AP Top 25
    - (1) Southern California 50, (16) Fresno State 42: Reggie Bush keeps the Trojans' winning streak alive with a Pac-10 record 516 all-purpose yards. An epic back-and-forth battle ends with a late SoCal interception by Darnell Bing.
    - Georgia Tech 14, (3) Miami (FL) 10: The Hurricanes' hopes of being in a BCS game are driven backwards as the Yellow Jackets upset them in a makeup game from Hurricane Wilma in Little Havana.
    - (4) LSU 40, Ole Miss 7: JaMarcus Russell's two touchdown passes lead the Bayou Bengals one step closer to a date with Georgia in the SEC title game, and only Arkansas on Friday (November 25) stands in their way.
    - (5) Penn State 31, Michigan State 22: The Nittany Lions not only win the Land Grant Trophy, but more importantly clinch the Big Ten BCS berth.
    - (6) Notre Dame 34, Syracuse 10: In an easy Irish win, Brady Quinn becomes the first Notre Dame quarterback to throw for 3,000 yards in a season, and also becomes the school's all-time leader in career passing yardage.
    - (7) Virginia Tech 52, Virginia 14: The Hokies keep their BCS hopes alive by winning the Commonwealth Cup. Cedric Humes runs for three touchdowns and Marcus Vick throws for two, even after some vandalism by unknown forces placing a "T" next to Virginia's logo at midfield of Scott Stadium.
    - (11) Auburn 28, (8) Alabama 18: The Tigers take a 21–0 first-quarter lead and never look back, winning their fourth consecutive Iron Bowl. Auburn's defense holds Alabama to 41 yards rushing and sacks Tide quarterback Brodie Croyle 11 times.
    - (9) Ohio State 25, (17) Michigan 21: Antonio Pittman's last-minute 3-yard touchdown seals a Buckeye victory. Troy Smith throws for 301 yards.
    - (10) Oregon 56, Oregon State 14: The Civil War left the Beavers in a fog — no pun intended — as the Ducks roll all over them at home, and post 50 points on the scoreboard for the first time in this rivalry.
    - (14) Georgia 45, Kentucky 14: The Bulldogs clinch the SEC East and the spot up the road in Atlanta for the title game in their backyard December 3. D.J. Shockley throws four touchdown passes.
    - Clemson 13, (19) South Carolina 9: James Davis scores a touchdown and the Tigers upset the Gamecocks in their backyard.
    - (21) Texas Tech 23, Oklahoma 21: Red Raiders running back Taurean Henderson scores on a two-yard run as time expires.
    - (23) Boston College 31, Maryland 16: The Eagles return a fumble and an interception for touchdowns.
    - UAB 35, (24) UTEP 23: The Blazers stun the Miners at home, thanks to Darryl Hackney's four touchdown passes.
  - Other notable games:
    - In Bill Snyder's final game as Kansas State coach, he leads the program he largely built to a 36–28 win over Missouri.
    - Vanderbilt beats rival Tennessee 28–24 in Knoxville, the Commodores' first win over the Volunteers since 1982 and their first in Knoxville since 1975. This also assures that the Vols, ranked third nationally in the preseason, will not be eligible for a bowl this season.
- Speed skating: Two world records are broken on the second day of the ISU World Cup meet in the Utah Olympic Oval. Joji Kato of Japan breaks the 500 m record with a time of 34.30 seconds, beating Hiroyasu Shimizu's old record by two hundredths of a second, while Chad Hedrick's week-old 5000m record is beaten by Sven Kramer, who skated 6:08.78. (AP)

== 18 November 2005 (Friday) ==
- Football: Manchester United and 34-year-old team captain Roy Keane announce that they are parting company with immediate effect "by mutual agreement". Keane's contract was due to expire next summer, but he hit the headlines earlier this month when he criticised many teammates by name for lack of effort in an unaired interview on MUTV. The club has offered Keane a testimonial in recognition of his 12½ years' service to the club. (MUFC)
- Speed skating: Chad Hedrick sets his second world record in six days at the 1500 metres at the ISU World Cup event in the Utah Olympic Oval. With a time of 1:42.78, he beat the previous record set by fellow American Shani Davis by just over half a second. Davis finished second at the event. (AP)

== 17 November 2005 (Thursday) ==
- Football:
  - The Bahrain Football Association announced an appeal was filed to FIFA over a disputed call by Colombian referee Oscar Julian Ruiz Acosta that disallowed a controversial goal by the Bahrain national side against the Trinidad and Tobago team in the second half of the second leg of their 2006 FIFA World Cup intercontinental qualifying playoff. Reuters via ESPN soccernet.com
  - The English Premier League settles its TV rights dispute with the Commission of the European Union. From the 2007–08 season, rights to live matches will be offered in six packages, and no one broadcaster will be allowed to buy all six. How this will affect the League's income compared to the £1 billion it currently receives for Sky's exclusive deal is unknown. (BBC)
  - German match-fixing scandal: Disgraced referee Robert Hoyzer, 26, is jailed for two years and five months after admitting fixing or trying to fix nine matches by judge Gerti Kramer. The prosecution had asked for a two-year suspended sentence for Hoyzer; however, Kramer said she was sending him up the river because his crimes were "adult acts" of serious weight. Another banished referee, Dominik Marks, who denied involvement, was also convicted and received a suspended sentence of eighteen months as the prosecution had asked for a two-year jail sentence. Croatian Ante Sapina, who led the betting ring involved, was jailed for two years and eleven months, while his brothers Filip and Milan Sapina received suspended sentences, Filip's suspended sentence is for 16 months, while Milan will have a one-year suspended sentence. According to the indictment, Sapina made €700,000 from one match, for which Hoyzer received €67,000 ($78,300 US) and a television set. Marks was accused of receiving €37,000 for his involvement in four matches. (BBC)
- Rugby union: The International Rugby Board (IRB) decide that the 2011 Rugby Union World Cup will be held in New Zealand. At a meeting in Dublin the IRB delegates viewed presentations from the three bidding nations, Japan, New Zealand and South Africa. South Africa dropped out after the first round of voting and New Zealand received a majority of votes in the second round. New Zealand previously co-hosted the inaugural 1987 Rugby Union World Cup. (NZPA)

== 16 November 2005 (Wednesday) ==
- Football: 2006 FIFA World Cup qualification (qualifying countries shown in **bold**):
  - Intercontinental playoffs, second leg:
    - Bahrain 0 – 1 Trinidad and Tobago: Trinidad and Tobago win their first-ever appearance at the World Cup Finals via a 2–1 aggregate score, though neither side looked like that they would be anything but easy targets for the major nations.
    - **Australia** 1 – 0 Uruguay: Australia wins the penalty shootout 4–2 to reverse their play-off defeat by Uruguay four years ago. Mark Schwarzer saves two Uruguay shots, and John Aloisi fires in the clincher to send the Socceroos back to the World Cup for the first time since 1974.
  - European playoffs, second leg:
    - Slovakia 1 – 1 **Spain** Spain advances on a 6–2 aggregate scoreline.
    - Turkey 4 – 2 Switzerland: In a pulsating match, Turkey almost recover from their first leg two-goal deficit and conceding a second minute penalty, with a hat-trick by Tuncay, but Switzerland qualify on the away goals rule. Things turn ugly after fights break out between players in the tunnel leading to the locker room at match's end.
    - **Czech Republic** 1 – 0 Norway: Petr Čech's clutch goalkeeping and Tomas Rosicky's 35th-minute goal leads the Czechs to bounce the Norwegians from the competition and clinch the final spot for Germany 2006, winning 2–0 on aggregate.
- Canadian football: The Canadian Football League and Canadian Interuniversity Sport announce that Toronto's Rogers Centre will host the 2007 Grey Cup and Vanier Cup. It will be the first time since 1973, when the Vanier Cup was known as the Canadian College Bowl, that the two Cup games will be hosted in the same city on the same weekend. (TSN)

== 15 November 2005 (Tuesday) ==
- NFL:
  - New York Giants co-owner Robert Tisch dies from brain cancer at 79. The other co-owner, Wellington Mara, died last month. Also, long-time Giants public address announcer Bob Sheppard will leave his position following the season. He will continue as the New York Yankees public address announcer. This year marks his 50th year as Giants' PA announcer, first at Yankee Stadium, then at the Yale Bowl, Shea Stadium and ultimately Giants Stadium in The Meadowlands.
- Major League Baseball
  - The players union and the owners agreed to toughen penalties on the use of steroids and other illegal drugs, such as amphetamines. Under the new plan, the first suspension will be for 50 games, the second offense 100 games, and the third will be a lifetime ban, with reinstatement appeals two years after the original punishment. In addition, random testing year round as well as tests during spring training and the regular season were made mandatory.
  - The New York Yankees and outfielder Hideki Matsui agreed to a four-year, $52 million contract extension.
  - Joe Maddon, the longtime bench coach of the Los Angeles Angels of Anaheim has been named the new manager of the Tampa Bay Devil Rays.
  - Ned Coletti, who began in baseball as a beat writer for the Philadelphia Journal in 1980, following the world championship season of the Philadelphia Phillies, was named the new general manager of the Los Angeles Dodgers, coming from their archrival nemesis the San Francisco Giants where he served as assistant general manager.
  - Post-Season Awards: Albert Pujols of the St. Louis Cardinals was named the winner of the 2005 National League Most Valuable Player Award, garnering 18 of the possible 32 first-place votes. Andruw Jones of the Atlanta Braves, who had the rest of the first-place markers with fourteen, finished in second place.
- NCAA College Football: Kansas State head coach Bill Snyder will retire following Saturday's game against Missouri.

== 14 November 2005 (Monday) ==
- Major League Baseball Postseason Awards: Third baseman Alex Rodriguez of the New York Yankees wins the 2005 American League Most Valuable Player Award, his second in three years, the first one in 2003 with the Texas Rangers, over Boston Red Sox DH David Ortiz.
- NFL Monday Night Football
  - Dallas Cowboys 21, Philadelphia Eagles 20: Roy Williams, the man who ended Terrell Owens' season eleven months earlier with a horse-collar tackle on the suspended Eagles wide receiver, returned a Donovan McNabb interception 46 yards for the game-winning touchdown to complete a comeback from 13 points down, and in the process, may have all but ended the Eagles' season.
- Olympics: The city of Busan in South Korea announces its bid to host the 2020 Summer Olympics.
- Cricket: Duleep Trophy, India: West Zone win the 2005–06 Duleep Trophy after chasing 175 in the fourth innings to win by five wickets against East Zone. West Zone wicket-keeper Parthiv Patel shared a sixth-wicket stand of 66 in the second innings with Jacob Martin to take West Zone to the target, while India fast bowler Zaheer Khan took four second-innings wickets, including the former national captain, Sourav Ganguly, for a duck. (The Hindu)

== 13 November 2005 (Sunday) ==
- NBA: LeBron James became the youngest player in league history (at 20 years, 348 days) to score 4,000 points, passing Kobe Bryant, during the Cleveland Cavaliers' 108–100 overtime win over the Orlando Magic.
- Canadian Football League Division Semifinals:
  - Montreal Alouettes 30, Saskatchewan Roughriders 14: Les Als, led by Ben Cahoon and Terry Vaughn, took a 24–0 lead into halftime, and advanced to the Eastern Division Final next Sunday against their bitter rivals, the Toronto Argonauts, in Toronto.
  - Edmonton Eskimos 33, Calgary Stampeders 26: Backup quarterback Jason Maas helped the Eskimos recover from being down 23–12. Starting quarterback Ricky Ray did not throw a touchdown pass, extending his dubious streak to six games. The Eskimos will face the BC Lions next Sunday in the Western Division Final in Vancouver.
- Soccer
  - MLS Cup Final at Pizza Hut Park, Frisco, Texas: Los Angeles Galaxy 1, New England Revolution 0 (aet): Guillermo Ramírez scores the match's only goal in the third minute of stoppage time during the first half of extra time. For the Galaxy, it's their second MLS cup title, both of which came against the Revs, and both of which came with the match's only goal scored in extra time.
- Auto racing
  - NASCAR 2005 Chase for the NEXTEL Cup: Checker Auto Parts 500: Chase driver Kurt Busch is suspended for the final two races of the season by Roush Racing after being arrested on charges of reckless driving. (ESPN.com) Ironically, Kurt's younger brother, Kyle, wins the race, his second win of the season. (NASCAR.com)
  - Grand Prix Masters: 1992 Formula One World Drivers Champion Nigel Mansell wins the GP Masters' inaugural race in Kyalami.
- NFL Week 10
  - Detroit Lions 29, Arizona Cardinals 21: Roy Williams catches three touchdown passes for the Lions, who outgain Arizona 157 yards to 38 on the ground.
  - Jacksonville Jaguars 30, Baltimore Ravens 3: The Ravens manage only 53 rushing yards and eight first downs. Greg Jones rushes for 106 yards and a touchdown.
  - Indianapolis Colts 31, Houston Texans 17: The Texans put up a fight after falling behind 21–0 but cannot answer a 297-yard, three-touchdown performance from Peyton Manning.
  - Buffalo Bills 14, Kansas City Chiefs 3: Trent Green throws three interceptions, while J. P. Losman, who lost his starting job to Kelly Holcomb three weeks ago, came off the bench for an injured Holcomb and hits Lee Evans for both Buffalo touchdowns.
  - Minnesota Vikings 24, New York Giants 21: It wasn't technically Christmas, but the Vikings had many happy returns, becoming the first team to return a kickoff (Koren Robonson's 86-yard second half kickoff return), punt (Mewelde Moore's 71 yard punt return) and interception (Darren Sharper's 92-yard pickoff return) for touchdowns in the same game. Paul Edinger hits a 46-yard field goal with 19 seconds left to win the game.
  - New England Patriots 23, Miami Dolphins 16: Gus Frerotte throws for 360 yards, but Miami stalls after getting first and goal with 1:30 left.
  - Chicago Bears 17, San Francisco 49ers 9: The longest play in NFL history, Nathan Vasher's 108-yard return of a missed field goal, puts the Bears ahead to stay. The embarrassing 49ers offense completed the grand total of one pass on a very windy day.
  - Denver Broncos 31, Oakland Raiders 17: The Raiders' bid to come back from a 23–0 deficit falters when Darrent Williams picks off a Kerry Collins pass and returns it 80 yards for a score.
  - Carolina Panthers 30, New York Jets 3: The struggling Jets turn the ball over six times, including four Brooks Bollinger interceptions, two picked off by Ken Lucas, and a third by Will Weatherspoon was returned for 35 yards for a touchdown. As for the Panthers' cheerleaders after last week's incident in a Tampa bar, insert your own joke here.
  - Green Bay Packers 33, Atlanta Falcons 25: Samkon Gado, a Nigerian who was the Packers' practice-squad running back when the season started, rushes for 103 yards and two touchdowns and catches a touchdown pass as the Pack upset the Falcons in the Georgia Dome.
  - Seattle Seahawks 31, St. Louis Rams 16: Shaun Alexander rushes for three touchdowns, bringing his total to 17 this season, in Seattle's fifth straight win.
  - Tampa Bay Buccaneers 36, Washington Redskins 35: With 58 seconds left, Jon Gruden opts to attempt a two-point conversion after a blocked PAT kick was nullified by a Redskins offside penalty following Chris Simms' 36-yard touchdown pass to Edell Shepherd. Mike Alstott blasts through the logjam at the goal line for the winning points.
  - Pittsburgh Steelers 34, Cleveland Browns 21: Hines Ward becomes the Steelers' all-time leader in pass receptions, passing John Stallworth in the blowout at Heinz Field. The Browns' Leigh Bodden returns a blocked field goal 59 yards for a touchdown, marking the first time in NFL history that an interception, a punt, a kickoff, a missed field goal attempt and a blocked field goal attempt were returned for touchdowns in the same day.

Bye Week: Cincinnati Bengals, New Orleans Saints, San Diego Chargers, Tennessee Titans.
(NOTE: This the final week for byes this season.)

- Speed skating: Chad Hedrick sets a new world record for the 5000 metres at the ISU World Cup in Calgary, Alberta, Canada with the time 6:09.68, beating the previous record by nearly five seconds. Four athletes skated under the previous world record of 6:14.66 by Jochem Uytdehaage during the 2002 Winter Olympics in Salt Lake City, Utah. (Nu.nl report – in Dutch)

== 12 November 2005 (Saturday) ==
- Football:
  - 2006 FIFA World Cup qualification.
    - Intercontinental playoffs, first leg:
      - Trinidad and Tobago 1 – 1 Bahrain
      - Uruguay 1 – 0 Australia
    - European playoffs, first leg:
      - Spain 5 – 1 Slovakia
      - Switzerland 2 – 0 Turkey
      - Norway 0 – 1 Czech Republic
    - Second legs: 16 November.
  - 2005 CAF Champions League Final:
    - Al Ahly of Egypt defeat Étoile Sahel of Tunisia 3–0 in the second leg of the final before their home fans in Cairo, and win 3–0 on aggregate. (BBC)
- Rugby union, November Tests:
  - England 26–16 Australia Tries from Ben Cohen and Mark Cueto, plus a strong performance by the English forwards, send the Wallabies to their seventh consecutive Test defeat.
  - France 50–6 Canada
  - Ireland 7–45 New Zealand The All Blacks dominate the Irish. Both Sitiveni Sivivatu and Doug Howlett score two tries.
  - Italy 48–0 Tonga Il Azzurri shut out the Tongans.
  - Scotland 19–23 Argentina Los Pumas come back from a 16–6 second-half deficit at Murrayfield, winning thanks to a converted penalty try in the 70th minute.
- Canadian Interuniversity Sport football – conference championships
  - Jewett Trophy: (10) Acadia Axemen 69, St. Francis Xavier X-Men 6: The Axemen break the record for the largest score and the largest winning margin in Jewett Trophy history as Chris Judd and Eric Nielsen connected for four touchdowns.
  - Hardy Trophy: (2) Saskatchewan Huskies 30, Alberta Golden Bears 17: Hec Crighton Trophy nominee David Stevens rushed for 193 yards and two touchdowns.
  - Dunsmore Cup: (1) Laval Rouge et Or 19, (5) University of Montreal Carabins 13: Pierre-Luc Yao leads Laval to two touchdowns to extend Laval's winning streak to 20 games, including the regular season.
  - Yates Cup: (3) Laurier Golden Hawks 29, (8) Western Ontario Mustangs 11: Nick Cameron scores three touchdowns for Laurier in the victory.
  - Laval will meet Saskatchewan next week in the Mitchell Bowl, while Laurier meets Acadia in the Uteck Bowl.
- NCAA College Football AP Top 25
  - (1) Southern California 35, Cal 10: LenDale White rushes for three touchdowns in the Trojans' 32nd-straight win, avenging their last loss two years ago at Berkeley.
  - (2) Texas 66, Kansas 14: The 'Horns score 28 first-quarter points and rock chalk the Jayhawks in Austin.
  - (3) Miami (FL) 47, Wake Forest 17: Kyle Wright throwns five touchdown passes, tying the Hurricanes' school record.
  - (5) LSU 16, (4) Alabama 13 (OT): JaMarcus Russell hits Dwayne Bowe with an 11-yard touchdown in overtime to end the Crimson Tide's bid for a perfect season. The Bayou Bengals now control their own destiny in the SEC's Western Division with games against Ole Miss and Arkansas left.
  - (7) Notre Dame 42, Navy 21: Irish quarterback Brady Quinn throws for 288 yards and four touchdowns.
  - (15) Auburn 31, (9) Georgia 30: After the Tigers complete a pass for 62 yards on fourth and ten, John Vaughn hits a 20-yard field goal with six seconds left.
  - (10) Ohio State 48, (25) Northwestern 7: The Buckeyes pile up 322 rushing yards prepping for next week's showdown against Michigan.
  - (11) Oregon 34, Washington State 31: Dennis Dixon and Brady Leaf (Ryan Leaf's brother) combine for 296 passing yards for the Ducks, who win on a last-second, 19-yard field goal from Paul Martinez.
  - South Carolina 30, (12) Florida 22: Steve Spurrier upsets the team he coached for twelve seasons. This is also the Gamecocks' first win over the Gators since 1939.
  - Oklahoma State 24, (13) Texas Tech 17: Al Peña scores on a quarterback sneak with 23 seconds left to complete the Cowboys' upset.
  - (14) UCLA 45, Arizona State 35: The Bruins bounce back from last week's humiliation with the help of 510 yards and five touchdown passes from Drew Olson.
  - Clemson 35, (17) Florida State 14: The "Bowden Bowl" sees son Tommy's Tigers squad defeat his father Bobby's Seminoles team thanks to a 269-yard, three-touchdown performance by Charlie Whitehurst.
  - (18) TCU 51, UNLV 3: The Horned Frogs go 8–0 in their first Mountain West Conference season, holding the Rebels to five yards rushing in their regular-season finale.
  - Iowa 20, (19) Wisconsin 10: The Hawkeyes spoil Barry Alvarez' final regular season home game as Wisconsin coach as the Badgers muster only nineteen rushing yards.
  - (21) Michigan 41, Indiana 14: The Wolverines run up all their points in the first half, warming up for next week's big home game against The Ohio State University.
  - Iowa State 30, (22) Colorado 16: In a game delayed due to a real tornado warning, the Cyclones scored two defensive touchdowns and kept their Big 12 North hopes alive.
  - Virginia 27, (24) Georgia Tech 17: The Cavaliers blow a 17-point lead but hold on to win and knock the Yellow Jackets out of the ACC Coastal Division race.

== 11 November 2005 (Friday) ==
- Rugby union, November Tests:
  - Wales 11–10 Fiji
- NCAA College Football AP Top 25
  - (23) Louisville 56, Rutgers 5: Brian Brohm passed for three touchdowns and ran for another as the Cardinals extended their home winning streak at Papa John's Cardinal Stadium to eleven games.

== 10 November 2005 (Thursday) ==
- Major League Baseball Postseason Awards: Chris Carpenter of the St. Louis Cardinals edges out Dontrelle Willis of the Florida Marlins to win the National League Cy Young Award, becoming the first Redbird since Bob Gibson to win the award back in 1970.
- NCAA College Football AP Top 25
  - (20) Fresno State 27, Boise State 7: Boise State loses its first WAC game since joining the conference in 2001.

== 9 November 2005 (Wednesday) ==
- Major League Baseball Postseason Awards: Ozzie Guillén of the Chicago White Sox wins American League Manager of the Year honors, while Bobby Cox of the Atlanta Braves earns the National League honors.
- Poker: Mike "The Mouth" Matusow wins the 2005 World Series of Poker Tournament of Champions at Caesars Palace in Las Vegas, Nevada defeating "Cowboy" Hoyt Corkins in the final hand. (WSOP official web site)
- Boxing: WBC heavyweight champion Vitali Klitschko announces his retirement due to a knee injury. As a result, the federation named Hasim Rahman as their new champion. AP/Yahoo!
- NCAA football AP Top 25
  - (16) West Virginia 38, Cincinnati 0: Steve Slaton rushes for four touchdowns as the Mountaineers rout the homestanding Bearcats.
- Cricket: Sri Lankan tour of India: India (197 for 3, Yuvraj 79*) beat Sri Lanka (196, Dilshan 59; R. P. Singh 4–35) by seven wickets. (Cricinfo)

== 8 November 2005 (Tuesday) ==
- Major League Baseball Post Season Awards: Bartolo Colón of the Los Angeles Angels of Anaheim wins the American League Cy Young Award, the first for the Cherubs since Dean Chance won in 1964.
- Tennis: Lleyton Hewitt pulls out of the Masters Cup Tournament in Shanghai, citing the impending birth of his first child with wife Bec Cartwright. His place will be taken by Gastón Gaudio. (ESPN.com)
- Football: German club F.C. Hansa Rostock successfully sue three streakers who invaded their pitch during a match in 2003. The German FA fined Hansa €20,000 for failing to keep their fans under control, but the club has now recouped its losses. The streakers intend to appeal. (Reuters)

== 7 November 2005 (Monday) ==
- Major League Baseball Postseason Awards: First baseman Ryan Howard of the Philadelphia Phillies and pitcher Huston Street of the Oakland Athletics are the winners of the National League and American League Rookies of the Year.
- NFL:
  - Monday Night Football
    - Indianapolis Colts 40, New England Patriots 21: Peyton Manning finally leads the Colts to victory at Gillette Stadium with three touchdown passes, two to Marvin Harrison. Edgerrin James adds 104 yards and one touchdown on the ground for the Colts.
  - The Philadelphia Eagles, who had suspended Terrell Owens without pay for the previous night's game against the Washington Redskins, announce that they will suspend him for three additional games without pay, and then deactivate him once the suspension ends. The NFL Players' Association will file a grievance and ask for a prompt hearing. (AP/Yahoo!)

== 6 November 2005 (Sunday) ==
- Auto racing
  - NASCAR 2005 Chase for the NEXTEL Cup: Carl Edwards edges Roush Racing teammate Mark Martin to win the Dickies 500. Tony Stewart's points lead over Jimmie Johnson narrowed to 35 points. (NASCAR.com)
  - Champ Car: Justin Wilson wins the season-ending El Gran Premio de Mexico City. (Champ Car Web Site)
  - A1 Grand Prix: A1 Team France wins both the sprint and feature races of the Australian round of the 2005–06 championship. (Pitpass)
- Canadian Football League, Week 20 – Calgary Stampeders quarterback Henry Burris carries to team to a 43–23 victory over archrivals Edmonton Eskimos, giving both teams identical 11–7 records. The two teams will meet again at McMahon Stadium in the Western Division semifinal next week. (TSN)
- NFL Week 9
  - Atlanta Falcons 17, Miami Dolphins 10: The Falcons make eleven third-down conversions, while the Dolphins go 0-for-9 on third.
  - Carolina Panthers 34, Tampa Bay Buccaneers 14: Steve Smith has his sixth 100-yard receiving game and Chris Gamble returns one of two Chris Simms pass interceptions for a 61-yard touchdown.
  - Cincinnati Bengals 21, Baltimore Ravens 9: Carson Palmer throws for 248 yards and two touchdowns to keep the Bengals in first place in the AFC North.
  - Minnesota Vikings 27, Detroit Lions 14: Michael Bennett, who enters the game when Mewelde Moore sprains his wrist, runs for 106 yards on 18 carries.
  - Jacksonville Jaguars 21, Houston Texans 14: Greg Jones' 12-yard touchdown run with 2:53 to go turns out to be the winning score.
  - Kansas City Chiefs 27, Oakland Raiders 23: Starting on his own 28-yard line with 1:45 to go, Trent Green leads Kansas City on a game-winning drive that ends with a one-yard Larry Johnson touchdown run with one second left in the game.
  - San Diego Chargers 31, New York Jets 26: LaDainian Tomlinson scores a career-high four touchdowns, and the Chargers hold off a furious comeback attempt by Brooks Bollinger and the Jets.
  - Cleveland Browns 20, Tennessee Titans 14: Reuben Droughns gains 116 yards rushing and 73 receiving as the Browns break a three-game losing streak.
  - At LSU Tiger Stadium in Baton Rouge, Louisiana: Chicago Bears 20, New Orleans Saints 17: "Da Bears" win on a 28-yard field goal by Robbie Gould with ten seconds left.
  - New York Giants 24, San Francisco 49ers 6: The Giants hold the 49ers to 138 total yards and five first downs. Brandon Jacobs scored two fourth-quarter touchdowns to seal the win.
  - Seattle Seahawks 33, Arizona Cardinals 19: Shaun Alexander rushes for 173 yards and two touchdowns, including an 88-yard touchdown to open the second half.
  - Pittsburgh Steelers 20, Green Bay Packers 10: No Ben Roethlisberger, no Jerome Bettis and no Willie Parker? No problem for the Steelers, who fail to make a third-down conversion and throw for only 59 yards. They still win thanks to a stingy defense that forces three turnovers, including a Troy Polamalu touchdown on a 77-yard return of a Brett Favre fumble.
  - Washington Redskins 17, Philadelphia Eagles 10: Donovan McNabb throws for 304 yards but is picked off by Ryan Clark at Washington's three-yard line with 1:30 left.

Bye Week: Buffalo Bills, Dallas Cowboys, Denver Broncos, St. Louis Rams.

- Cricket:
  - Australia (435 & 289–2d) complete a four-day victory over the West Indies (210 & 129) by 379 runs in the first Test of the 3-Test series. Ricky Ponting scores centuries in both innings, while Shane Warne and Brett Lee gets five-fors in the first and second innings respectively. Nathan Bracken takes career-best figures in the second innings, with four for 48, while only one West Indies batsman passes 50 in any innings – Devon Smith, with 88 in the first. West Indies captain Shivnarine Chanderpaul states that this was "probably the worst we've had so far." (Cricinfo) (Cricinfo interview)
  - Sri Lanka (286 for 5) break India's (285 for 8) four-match winning streak with a five-wicket victory in the fifth ODI at Ahmedabad. India bats first, and after scores of 103 from Gautam Gambhir and Rahul Dravid they make 285, despite Farveez Maharoof getting a bowling analysis of 5–0–20–4. Maharoof is subbed on for Nuwan Zoysa (5–0–29–2) in the 14th over. After two wickets from Ajit Agarkar, Sri Lanka are 155 for 5, but Tillakaratne Dilshan makes 81 to guide them to their first win on tour – but they're still 1–4 down in the 7-match series. (Cricinfo)
- Soccer: MLS Cup 2005 Playoffs: Conference Finals
  - Eastern Conference Final: New England Revolution 1, Chicago Fire 0: Clint Dempsey scores the match's only goal in the fourth minute. A controversial moment occurred near the end of the game when Chicago thought they had leveled the score by Gonzalo Segaras, but referee Terry Vaughn disallowed it as assistant referee George Gerner rules Segaras was offside, leading to the sending off of Fire player Andy Herron for abusive language and a scuffle after the final whistle blew at midfield. The Revs will now face the Galaxy in the MLS Cup final on November 13 in Frisco, Texas in a rematch of the 2002 final, which the Galaxy won in extra time 1–0.
- Football: English Premiership
  - Chelsea's 40-match unbeaten run in the FA Premier League is ended by a 1–0 defeat by CManchester United.

World Middleweight Armwrestling Champion Chris Coletti will suffer a massive stroke in 2 days at his home.

== 5 November 2005 (Saturday) ==
- NFL: The Philadelphia Eagles suspend their superstar wide receiver Terrell Owens indefinitely for "conduct detrimental to the team." This came after an Owens interview with ESPN in which he criticized the Eagles for not publicly recognizing his 100th career receiving touchdown two weeks ago, and also said the Eagles would be undefeated if Brett Favre were their quarterback instead of Donovan McNabb. (AP/Yahoo!) For an update, see listing for 7 November.
- NCAA football AP Top 25:
  - (1) Southern California 51, Stanford 21 The Trojans score on each of their first seven possessions in the first half, with Matt Leinart throwing for four touchdowns.
  - (2) Texas 62, Baylor 0 Ramonce Taylor rushes for three touchdowns and catches a TD pass, and Vince Young has 351 yards of total offense in a Longhorns rout.
  - (5) Miami (Florida) 27, (3) Virginia Tech 7 The Hurricanes defense forced Marcus Vick into throwing two interceptions and forced a total of six turnovers in an easy win in Blacksburg, taking the lead in the ACC Coastal Division. The loss drops the Hokies to 8–1 and leaves Southern California, Texas and Alabama as the only undefeated teams in Division I-A.
  - (4) Alabama 17, Mississippi State 0 The Tide return a fumbled kickoff and an interception for TDs, and their defense holds the Bulldogs to 103 total yards.
  - (6) LSU 24, Appalachian State 0: JaMarcus Russell threw for 208 yards and two touchdowns to lead the Bayou Bengals past the Division I-AA Mountaineers.
  - Arizona 52, (7) UCLA 14: The Bruins are humiliated in Tucson by the Wildcats, who score the first 28 points and never look back. Arizona rushed for 320 yards, with Mike Bell and Gilbert Harris combining to rush for 269 yards.
  - (8) Notre Dame 41, Tennessee 21 The Fighting Irish become bowl-eligible thanks to three Brady Quinn TD passes and two Tom Zbikowski return TDs (a punt and an interception).
  - NC State 20, (9) Florida State 15 The Wolfpack are paced to the road upset by Andre Brown's 179 rushing yards and a defense that intercepts three FSU passes. Nonetheless, the Seminoles clinch the ACC Atlantic Division due to Boston College's loss to North Carolina, and will play in the conference championship on December 3 in Jacksonville, Florida.
  - (10) Penn State 35, (14) Wisconsin 14: The Nittany Lions all but clinch the Big Ten Conference BCS bowl bid, routing the Badgers in University Park as Badgers' QB John Stocco was sacked nine times by the Penn State defense. The reason that it is the "BCS" berth is because the Rose Bowl serves as the BCS National Championship game this year.
  - (12) Ohio State 40, Illinois 2: Troy Smith threw for three touchdowns and Antonio Pittman ran for the other two n a rout of the Fighting Illini.
  - (13) Florida 49, Vanderbilt 42 (2 OT) Although Vandy quarterback Jay Cutler made a fourth-quarter comeback to tie the game at 35–35, he was intercepted by Reggie Lewis in the second overtime as the Gators pulled one out at home.
  - (15) Oregon 27, (23) Cal Berkeley 20 (OT): Brady Leaf's four-yard TD pass to James Finley in overtime was the difference for the Ducks.
  - (16) Texas Tech 52, Texas A&M 17 Cody Hodges passes for 409 yards as the Red Raiders and their run-and-shoot offense dominate the Aggies at home.
  - (17) Auburn 49, Kentucky 27 The Tigers rush for 384 yards and five TDs in a rout of the homestanding Wildcats.
  - North Carolina 16, (19) Boston College 14: Wallace Wright returned the opening kickoff 90 yards for a TD and Connor Barth kicked three field goals, propelling the home team to an upset of the Eagles.
  - (20) TCU 33, Colorado State 6: The Horned Frogs wrapped up their first outright conference championship since 1958 as a member of the late Southwest Conference with the Mountain West Conference title in a thrashing of the Rams.
  - (21) Fresno State 45, San Jose State 7 The Bulldogs roll thanks to a great performance from quarterback Paul Pinegar who threw for 374 yards and 3 TD passes.
  - (25) Colorado 41, Missouri 12 Lawrence Vickers rushed for four TDs as the Buffaloes and Mason Crosby kicked a pair of field goals including a 56 yarder. They have all but clinched the Big 12 North.
- Rugby union November Tests:
  - Argentina 23–34 South Africa
  - France 26–16 Australia Les Bleus send the Wallabies crashing to their sixth consecutive Test defeat, their worst streak since 1969. Wallabies captain George Gregan takes sole possession of the all-time lead for national team caps in the sport's history with his 115th appearance. (BBC)
  - Wales 3–41 New Zealand Rico Gear scores a hat trick of tries; Dan Carter scores all the other points, including two tries of his own; and a stifling All Blacks defence frustrates the Welsh. (BBC)
- Soccer: MLS Cup 2005 Playoffs: Conference Finals
  - Western Conference Final: Los Angeles Galaxy 2, Colorado Rapids 0: The Galaxy, fourth in the West at the start of this postseason, reaches their fifth MLS Cup Final in franchise history, winning once in 2002. Landon Donovan scores both of L.A.'s goals. What would've been Colorado's only goal of the match in the 34th minute was taken away after referee Brian Hall blew the whistle while the ball was in the air to deal with pushing and shoving in the box.

== 4 November 2005 (Friday) ==
- Major League Baseball: Two homecomings were announced by MLB teams. The New York Yankees announced Ron Guidry would be their new pitching coach, and the Milwaukee Brewers named Hall of Famer Robin Yount would return to be their bench coach, both for the 2006 season.
- Cricket: At Kingsmead, rain forces a no result between South Africa and New Zealand in Nathan Astle's 200th One Day International. South Africa make 79 for 2 before rain stopped play. (Cricinfo)

== 3 November 2005 (Thursday) ==
- New York New York Yankees outfielder Matt Lawton tested positive for boldenone, in violation of Major League Baseball drug policy, and will be suspended for the first ten games of the 2006 season.
- NCAA College Football AP Top 25
  - (24) Louisville 42, Pittsburgh 20 Michael Bush runs for 113 yards and two touchdowns to lead the Cardinals to the win. Louisville defensive end Elvis Dumervil sets an NCAA record by forcing his ninth fumble of the season.
- NBA Premiere Week
  - Indiana Pacers 105, Miami Heat 102: Shaquille O'Neal sprained his ankle in the home opener loss for the Floridians and will be out for two to four weeks.
  - Phoenix Suns 122, Los Angeles Lakers 112
- Cricket: Sri Lanka tour of India: A team effort, with five men making above 35 and Rahul Dravid top-scoring with 63, sees India chase 262 to win against Sri Lanka. Ajit Agarkar takes five wickets for 44 runs, his second best bowling figures of his ODI career, and 87 from Marvan Atapattu was not enough to help his team avoid the loss. India takes an unassailable 4–0 lead in the 7-match series. (Cricinfo)
- Football: 2005–06 UEFA Cup: Group stage, matchday 2
  - Group A: Hamburg 2–0 Viking Stavanger
  - Group A: Slavia Prague 4–2 CSKA Sofia
  - Group B: Brøndby 2–0 Maccabi Petach Tikva
  - Group B: Palermo 0–0 Lokomotiv Moscow
  - Group C: Lens 5–0 Halmstad
  - Group C: Sampdoria 0–0 Steaua Bucharest
  - Group D: Middlesbrough 3–0 Dnipro Dnipropetrovsk
  - Group D: Litex Lovech 2–1 Grasshoppers
  - Group E: Red Star Belgrade 1–2 FC Basel
  - Group E: Strasbourg 2–0 Tromsø
  - Group F: Levski Sofia 1–0 Dinamo Bucharest
  - Group F: Heerenveen 0–0 CSKA Moscow
  - Group G: Rapid București 2–0 Rennes
  - Group G: VfB Stuttgart 0–2 Shakhtar Donetsk
  - Group H: Bolton Wanderers 1–0 Zenit St. Petersburg
  - Group H: Sevilla 3–0 Beşiktaş
  - See also 2005–06 UEFA Cup.

== 2 November 2005 (Wednesday) ==
- NCAA College Football AP Top 25
  - (23) West Virginia 45, UConn 13
- NBA Premiere Week
  - Cleveland Cavaliers 109, New Orleans/Oklahoma City Hornets 87
  - Washington Wizards 99, Toronto Raptors 96
  - Indiana Pacers 90, Orlando Magic 78
  - Milwaukee Bucks 110, New Jersey Nets 96
  - Boston Celtics 114, New York Knicks 100 (OT)
  - Detroit Pistons 108, Philadelphia 76ers 88
  - Minnesota Timberwolves 90, Portland Trail Blazers 86
  - Miami Heat 97, Memphis Grizzlies 78
  - Chicago Bulls 109, Charlotte Bobcats 105 (OT)
  - Houston Rockets 98, Sacramento Kings 89
  - Utah Jazz 93, Dallas Mavericks 82
  - Los Angeles Clippers 101, Seattle SuperSonics 93
  - Los Angeles Lakers 99, Denver Nuggets 97
  - Golden State Warriors 122, Atlanta Hawks 97
- Football: 2005–06 UEFA Champions League: Group stage, matchday 4
  - Group A: Club Brugge 3–2 Rapid Vienna
    - Rapid are now assured of last place in the group, eliminating them from any further European competition this season.
  - Group A: Juventus 2–1 Bayern Munich
  - Group B: Arsenal 3–0 Sparta Prague
    - Arsenal have clinched a spot in the final 16.
  - Group B: FC Thun 2–4 Ajax
  - Group C: Barcelona 5–0 Panathinaikos
  - Group C: Werder Bremen 4–3 Udinese
  - Group D: Lille 1–0 Manchester United
  - Group D: Benfica 0–1 Villarreal
  - See also 2005–06 UEFA Champions League.

== 1 November 2005 (Tuesday) ==
- Football: 2005–06 UEFA Champions League: Group stage, matchday 4
  - Group E: Schalke 04 2–0 Fenerbahçe
  - Group E: PSV 1–0 A.C. Milan
  - Group F: Rosenborg 0–2 Real Madrid
  - Group F: Olympiakos 1–4 Lyon
    - Both Lyon and Real Madrid have clinched spots in the final 16.
  - Group G: Liverpool 3–0 Anderlecht
  - Group G: Real Betis 1–0 Chelsea
  - Group H: Internazionale 2–1 Porto
  - Group H: Artmedia Bratislava 2–2 Rangers
  - See also 2005–06 UEFA Champions League.
- NBA Premiere Week
  - Milwaukee Bucks 117, Philadelphia 76ers 108 (OT)
  - New Orleans/Oklahoma City Hornets 91, Sacramento Kings 67
  - San Antonio Spurs 102, Denver Nuggets 91
  - Dallas Mavericks 111, Phoenix Suns 108 (2 OT)
- Horse Racing:
  - The Melbourne Cup was won by Makybe Diva for the third straight year, becoming the first horse to do so. Melbourne Herald Sun
  - Best Mate, three-times winner of the Cheltenham Gold Cup (2002–2004) collapses and dies of a suspected heart attack following a race at Exeter. (BBC)
