= October 2005 in sports =

<<	October 2005					>>
Su	Mo	Tu	We	Th	Fr	Sa
						1
2	3	4	5	6	7	8
9	10	11	12	13	14	15
16	17	18	19	20	21	22
23	24	25	26	27	28	29
30	31
Sports

This list shows notable sports-related deaths, events, and notable outcomes that occurred in October of 2005.

== Deaths ==
- 30 – Al López
- 28 – Bob Broeg
- 23 – Harry Dalton
- 25 – Wellington Mara
- 18 – Bill King
- 18 – Johnny Haynes
- 15 – Al Widmar
- 15 – Jason Collier
- 9 – Tom Cheek
- 2 – Pat Kelly

== Ongoing events ==
- 2005 in NASCAR
- 2005–06 FA Premiership
- 2005–06 in English football
- 2005–06 in Scottish football
- 2005 in Swedish football
- 2005–06 in Ligue 1
- 2005–06 Hyundai A-League (Australia)
- 2005–06 UEFA Champions League
- 2005 NFL season
- 2005 CFL season
- 2005–06 NHL season
- 2005–06 Heineken Cup
- 2005–06 NBA season
- 21 October-6 November: Cricket: New Zealand tour of South Africa
- 25 October-12 November: Cricket: Sri Lanka tour of India

== 31 October 2005 (Monday) ==
- MLB: A day after he was offered a $4.5 million, 3-year contract extension, Theo Epstein resigns as the general manager of the Boston Red Sox, only one year after he built the team that won the 2004 World Series.
- NFL Monday Night Football:
  - Pittsburgh Steelers 20, Baltimore Ravens 19: In only the fifth Halloween game in the history of MNF, Jeff Reed's 37-yard field goal with 1:37 left gives the Steelers the win over their divisional rivals.
- Cricket: India (303 for 4, Dhoni 183 not out; Muralitharan 2–46) beat Sri Lanka (298 for 4, Sangakkara 138 not out, Jayawardene 71; Agarkar 2–62) by six wickets at Jaipur in the third ODI of the seven-match series to take a 3–0 lead. Dhoni's 183 not out is the sixth-highest score of all time in ODIs, the highest by a number three batsman, the highest by a batsman in a chasing side in a 50-over game, and the highest by a wicket-keeper. (ODI Career Highest Individual Scores from Cricinfo), (Cricinfo bulletin)

== 30 October 2005 (Sunday) ==
- Soccer: MLS Cup 2005 Playoffs: Conference semifinals
  - Chicago Fire 4, D.C. United 0
    - Game 2's score is also the series' final aggregate. The Fire stun over 20,000 raucous fans at RFK Stadium to knock out the defending MLS Cup champions. Iván Guerrero scores two for Chicago, both in the first half, including a highlight reel-making, one-timer blast in the fifth minute of stoppage time from outside the box, eliciting a loud "Oh my!" from ESPN2's Rob Stone that Dick Enberg would have been proud of. In the 55th minute, the United's Christian Gómez is sent off for spitting on the Fire's C.J. Brown after the two tangle while fighting for the ball. The Fire will take on the New England Revolution in next Sunday's Eastern Conference Final.
- Major League Baseball: Al López, who led two American League teams – the Cleveland Indians in 1954 and the Chicago White Sox in 1959 – to pennants, died of a heart attack at the age of 97.
- NASCAR 2005 Chase for the NEXTEL Cup: Carl Edwards wins the Bass Pro Shops MBNA 500 at Atlanta Motor Speedway. NASCAR.com
- NFL Week 8
  - Dallas Cowboys 34, Arizona Cardinals 13: Rookie Marion Barber rushes for 127 yards and two touchdowns for the Cowboys, who win their 14th straight home game against Arizona.
  - Chicago Bears 19, Detroit Lions 13 (OT): Charles Tillman returns an interception of Jeff Garcia 22 yards for the winning score.
  - Houston Texans 19, Cleveland Browns 16: Two key sacks by Gary Walker and 177 return yards from Jerome Mathis help the Texans get their first win of the season.
  - Cincinnati Bengals 21, Green Bay Packers 14: Brett Favre throws five interceptions as the Packers fall to 1–6.
  - St. Louis Rams 24, Jacksonville Jaguars 21: Steven Jackson runs for 179 yards and catches a touchdown pass for the Rams.
  - Carolina Panthers 38, Minnesota Vikings 13: Jake Delhomme throws for 341 yards — 201 of them to Steve Smith — and three touchdowns for Carolina, which has won four straight games. The Vikings lost quarterback Daunte Culpepper for the season with a knee injury.
  - Oakland Raiders 34, Tennessee Titans 25: Kerry Collins throws three touchdowns and Warren Sapp records 2.5 sacks for the Raiders.
  - New York Giants 36, Washington Redskins 0: Tiki Barber rushes for 206 yards, while the Redskins muster only 125 yards from scrimmage... as a team.
  - San Diego Chargers 28, Kansas City Chiefs 20: The Chargers complete three touchdown passes — one by LaDainian Tomlinson.
  - At Louisiana State University Tiger Stadium, Baton Rouge, Louisiana: Miami Dolphins 21, New Orleans Saints 6: Nick Saban's homecoming to the stadium where he coached LSU from 1999 through 2004, including a shared national title in 2003, was successful, while the Saints' Louisiana homecoming was not as successful.
  - Denver Broncos 49, Philadelphia Eagles 21: Jake Plummer throws four touchdown passes; three come before Donovan McNabb completes his first pass.
  - San Francisco 49ers 15, Tampa Bay Buccaneers 10: Ken Dorsey throws for only 40 yards against his old team, but the 49ers win thanks to three takeaways, five sacks and five Joe Nedney field goals.
  - New England Patriots 21, Buffalo Bills 16: Tedy Bruschi makes his emotional comeback to Gillette Stadium, and Corey Dillon scores two touchdowns in the last 8 minutes to bring the Pats back from a 16–7 deficit.

Bye Week: Atlanta Falcons, Indianapolis Colts, New York Jets, Seattle Seahawks.

- Cricket: South Africa (245 for 6, Gibbs 81, Kemp 30 (19b); Adams 2–40) beat New Zealand (243 for 9, Styris 78, Fleming 54; Ntini 3–37, Shaun Pollock 0–23 (10 ovs)) in the third ODI at St George's Park, Port Elizabeth. The victory leaves South Africa 3–0 up with two matches to play, thus clinching the series victory. (Cricinfo)

== 29 October 2005 (Saturday) ==
- Soccer: MLS Cup 2005 Playoffs: Conference semifinals
  - New England Revolution 3, MetroStars 1
    - The Revs win the series 3–2 on aggregate. The MetroStars score a second-half goal, but the Revolution score three unanswered goals, the winner from Khano Smith, to take the 2-game set. For the Revolution, it's their third straight trip to the Eastern Conference final. They've lost the previous two visits.
  - F.C. Dallas 2, Colorado Rapids 2 (After regulation)
    - The Rapids take the series by winning a penalty kick shootout 5–4. Dallas' Carlos Ruiz scores both of the team's regulation goals, but he had a chance for a hat trick; in the 112th minute, Ruiz has a penalty kick deflect off the left post. Jeff Cunningham and Ritchie Kotschau score the Rapids' regulation goals.
  - San Jose Earthquakes 1, Los Angeles Galaxy 1
    - The Galaxy take the series 4–2 on aggregate. Brian Ching scores early for the Quakes, but it's Ned Grabavoy who clinches the 2-game set by tying the game in the 67th minute. The Galaxy will go to Denver for this Saturday's Western Conference Final.
- Major League Baseball: Paul DePodesta was fired as the general manager of the Los Angeles Dodgers.
- Cricket: Ireland defeats Kenya to win the 2005 ICC Intercontinental Cup.
- NCAA college football AP Top 25:
  - (1) USC 55, Washington State 13 The Trojans score touchdowns on their first 4 possessions in a romp over the Cougars.
  - (2) Texas 47, Oklahoma State 28 Vince Young leads the Longhorns back from a 28–9 second-quarter deficit to win in Stillwater.
  - (16) Florida 14, (4) Georgia 10 Chris Leak leads his Gators over the D. J. Shockley-less Bulldogs to win the Florida vs. Georgia Football Classic in Jacksonville. This loss is UGA's first of the year and will see them drop in the polls.
  - (5) Alabama 35, Utah State 3
  - (6) Miami (Florida) 34, North Carolina 16
  - (7) LSU 56, North Texas 3
  - (8) UCLA 30, Stanford 27 (OT) Drew Olson leads the Bruins back from 24 points down in the 4th quarter to see them win in overtime. This is the Bruins' 3rd comeback win in 4 games.
  - (10) Florida State 35, Maryland 27
  - (11) Penn State 33, Purdue 15
  - (12) Ohio State 45, Minnesota 31 Ted Ginn Jr. runs a kick back for a touchdown and Antonio Pittman gets two rushing touchdowns as the Buckeyes beat the Gophers at the Hubert H. Humphrey Metrodome.
  - (15) Wisconsin 41, Illinois 24 Freshman running back Brian Calhoun scores four TDs as the Badgers win easily.
  - (17) Texas Tech 28, Baylor 0 Tech scores 22 points in the fourth quarter as what looked to be a defensive struggle quickly turned into a rout.
  - (19) Auburn 27, Mississippi 3
  - (20) TCU 23, San Diego State 20
  - (25) Michigan 33, (21) Northwestern 17
  - (22) Fresno State 27, Hawaii 13 Running back Wendell Mathis rushed for three TDs as the Bulldogs stay undefeated in the WAC.
  - South Carolina 16, (23) Tennessee 15 The Gamecocks snap a 12-game losing streak at Neyland Stadium with a field goal from Josh Brown with 2:45 left in the game. The Vols drop to 3–4 as a result of this game.
- NFL: The New England Patriots activate linebacker Tedy Bruschi, who suffered a mild stroke in February 2005, from the "physically unable to perform" list, making him eligible to play tomorrow against the Buffalo Bills. (AP/Yahoo!)
- Horse Racing: Breeders' Cup World Championship at Belmont Park. Winners of the races were:
  - Juvenile Fillies (Two-year-old females): Folklore.
  - Juvenile (Two-year-old males): Stevie Wonderboy.
  - Filly & Mare Turf (Females): Intercontinental.
  - Sprint: Silver Train.
  - Mile: Artie Schiller.
  - Distaff (Older females): Pleasant Home.
  - Turf: Shirocco.
  - Classic: Saint Liam.

NTRA Breeders' Cup website

== 28 October 2005 (Friday) ==
- Major League Baseball: In an attempt to cut down the number of home runs being hit there, the Philadelphia Phillies announced that the fences in left field at Citizens Bank Park will be moved back in time for the 2006 season. Phillies web site
- Cricket:
  - South Africa (201 for 9, Kallis 51, Boucher 40; Mills 4–44, Styris 2–29, Bond 2–42) beat New Zealand (182, Vincent 90; Ntini 3–29, Langeveldt 3–35, Boje 2–26) by 19 runs in the second ODI of the 5-match series. They lead the series 2–0. (Cricinfo)
  - India (123 for 2, Tendulkar 67 not out, Sehwag 38) chase down a low target set by Sri Lanka (122; Pathan 4–37, Harbhajan 2–19, Yadav 2–32) to win the ODI at Mohali and go 2–0 up in the 7-match series. (Cricinfo)

== 27 October 2005 (Thursday) ==
- NCAA College Football AP Top 25
  - (3) Virginia Tech 30, (13) Boston College 10

== 26 October 2005 (Wednesday) ==
- Major League Baseball 2005 World Series Game 4
  - Chicago White Sox 1, Houston Astros 0
    - WP: Freddy García. LP: Brad Lidge. SV: Bobby Jenks. The deciding game of the 2005 World Series was a pitcher's duel, with White Sox starter García allowing four hits and Astors starter Brandon Backe giving up five hits as both pitched seven shutout innings with seven strikeouts apiece, including a stretch where Backe struck out six consecutive batters. The string of scoreless innings was the longest since Game Seven of the 1991 World Series. World Series MVP Jermaine Dye's RBI single in the eighth inning scoring pinch-hitter Willie Harris proved to be the difference. This is the first World Series win for the South Siders since 1917. It was the first 1–0 Series clinching game since Game Six of the 1995 World Series, which saw the Atlanta Braves defeat the Cleveland Indians and the first 1–0 game in any World Series game since Game Five of the 1996 World Series when the New York Yankees beat Atlanta. It is also the third year in a row where the home team (here, the Astros) did not win the deciding game of a World Series. White Sox win series, 4–0.
- Japan Series: The Chiba Lotte Marines, managed by Bobby Valentine, sweep the Hanshin Tigers in four games, winning Game Four by a 3–2 score. The win gives the former Lotte Orions their first Japan Series title in thirty-one years and makes Valentine the first non-Japanese-born manager to win the Japanese baseball championship.
- WNBA: Sheryl Swoopes, in an interview with ESPN The Magazine, says that she is a lesbian.

== 25 October 2005 (Tuesday) ==
- Major League Baseball 2005 World Series Game 3
  - Chicago White Sox 7, Houston Astros 5 (14 innings)
    - WP: Dámaso Marte. LP: Ezequiel Astacio. SV: Mark Buehrle. HRs: ChW – Joe Crede, Geoff Blum; Hou – Jason Lane. In the longest Series game played by time (five hours and forty-one minutes) and by the number of innings (a record-tying fourteen), Geoff Blum hit a home run off his former teammates to bring the White Sox one step away from their first World Championship in eighty-eight years. After the Astros had built a 4–0 lead, the White Sox sent 11 men to the plate in a 5-run 5th inning off Roy Oswalt; the Astros tied the game on Jason Lane's double in the 8th, their only hit after the 4th inning. White Sox lead series, 3–0.
- Atlanta Braves pitcher John Smoltz was named the 2005 winner of the Roberto Clemente Award by Major League Baseball for community service.
- NFL: Wellington Mara, long time owner of the New York Giants football club, dies from cancer at the age of 89.
- Football: Swedish club IF Elfsborg announce that they will repay the admission fee and transport costs of fans who went to see their 8–1 thrashing by league champions Djurgårdens IF on the last day of the Allsvenskan season. "We wish that we had been able to say that it depended on external factors, but there are no excuses, no explanations. We were just bad", the club said in a statement. (Reuters)
- Cricket: India (350 for 6, Tendulkar 93, Dravid 85, Pathan 83) beat the second-placed team in the ICC ODI Championship, Sri Lanka (198 ao in 35.4 overs, Sangakkara 43 – Harbhajan 3–35, Kartik 3–48), by 152 runs at Nagpur in the first ODI in the 7-match series. (Cricinfo)

== 24 October 2005 (Monday) ==
- Formula One: The 2006 Formula One season will feature a new qualifying format, and, after a year's absence, tire changes. The new qualifying session will be done in knockout form – all 20 cars will go out. After 15 minutes, the 5 slowest cars will be kicked off the track; after another 15 minutes, 5 more cars will be kicked off, leaving 10 cars to duke it out for 20 more minutes. (Yahoo!)
- NFL
  - Monday Night Football
    - Atlanta Falcons 27, New York Jets 14: The Falcons score 17 points off of three Vinny Testaverde fumbles in the first 17+ minutes of the game, as they easily defeat the injury-plagued Jets. (Yahoo! Sports/AP)
  - St. Louis Rams coach Mike Martz will miss the remainder of the 2005 season with the heart valve disease he suffered earlier this month.
  - Ahman Green, the Green Bay Packers' leading rusher, was lost for the season with a broken leg.
- Football: Celtic manager Gordon Strachan is named Scotland's FIFA SOS Ambassador for next year's World Cup, joining Wayne Rooney from Manchester United and England's national squad.

== 23 October 2005 (Sunday) ==
- Major League Baseball 2005 World Series Game 2
  - Chicago White Sox 7, Houston Astros 6
    - WP: Neal Cotts. LP: Brad Lidge. HRs: Hou – Morgan Ensberg; ChW – Paul Konerko (Grand slam), Scott Podsednik (Walk-off). The White Sox lived up to their motto for 2005 "Win. Or Die Trying" by fighting back twice. Down 4–2, after Jermaine Dye was ruled by home plate umpire Jeff Nelson to have been hit by a pitch, Paul Konerko hit a grand slam to put the White Sox ahead. However, when closer Bobby Jenks gave up a game-tying two-run pinch hit single by José Vizcaíno in the top half of the ninth, Scott Podsednik hit a one-out walk-off homer off Brad Lidge in the bottom half to give the South Siders the win. Konerko's slam was the eighteenth in Fall Classic history, while Podsednik's game-ending homer was the fourteenth in Series annals. White Sox lead series, 2–0.
- NFL Week 7
  - Detroit Lions 13, Cleveland Browns 10: Jeff Garcia, in his first start for the Lions, beat the team that released him during the off-season in Cleveland.
  - Minnesota Vikings 23, Green Bay Packers 20: Paul Edinger's 56-yard field goal with no time on the clock was the margin of victory for the embattled Vikings squad.
  - Indianapolis Colts 38, Houston Texans 20: Coach Tony Dungy won his 100th game as an NFL head coach between Tampa Bay and Indianapolis, the 34th in league history to reach that mark.
  - St. Louis Rams 28, New Orleans Saints 17
  - Pittsburgh Steelers 27, Cincinnati Bengals 13: A record crowd of 66,104 Cincinnatians were disappointed to see the Bengals lose to their divisional rivals.
  - Philadelphia Eagles 20, San Diego Chargers 17: Rookie Matt Ware's 65-yard return of blocked field goal by San Diego's Nate Kaeding and Darwin Walker's late fumble recovery allowed the Eagles to escape at home. LaDainian Tomlinson was held to seven yards on seventeen carries and did not score, ending his NFL record-tying 18-game streak of scoring at least one touchdown. Terrell Owens caught his 100th touchdown pass, the sixth player in NFL history to do so.
  - Washington Redskins 52, San Francisco 49ers 17: The Redskins scored the most points since a 1991 game against the Atlanta Falcons in routing the hapless Niners in Landover, Maryland.
  - Seattle Seahawks 13, Dallas Cowboys 10:Ryan Hannan's eight-yard TD catch from Matt Hasselbeck, and Josh Brown's 50-yard field goal after a Jordan Babineaux interception gave the Seahawks a comeback win against America's Team.
  - Chicago Bears 10, Baltimore Ravens 6
  - Oakland Raiders 38, Buffalo Bills 17
  - New York Giants 24, Denver Broncos 23: Amani Toomer's two yard TD catch from Eli Manning was the difference with five seconds left and the G-Men ended the Broncos' winning streak at five games.
  - Arizona Cardinals 20, Tennessee Titans 10

Bye Week: Carolina Panthers, Jacksonville Jaguars, New England Patriots, Tampa Bay Buccaneers.

- NASCAR 2005 Chase for the NEXTEL Cup: Jeff Gordon sweeps the 2005 races at Martinsville Speedway by winning the Subway 500. NASCAR.com
- Champ Car World Series: Sébastien Bourdais wins the Lexmark Indy 300 in Surfers Paradise, Queensland. By just starting the race, Bourdais clinches his second-straight Champ Car title, the first time Newman-Haas Racing has ever won two straight Champ Car titles.
- Soccer: MLS Cup 2005 Playoffs: Conference semifinals
  - Los Angeles Galaxy 3, San Jose Earthquakes 1
    - The Galaxy's Landon Donovan scores twice – both goals coming late in each half – and Herculez Gomez adds another goal for the rout. For the Supporters' Shield-winning Quakes, it's just their second loss in all competitions since mid-July, both to the Galaxy. In July, L.A. beat San Jose in the quarters of the U.S. Open Cup.
- Cricket: South Africa fight back to chase down New Zealand's total of 249 for 8 in the first ODI of the 5-match series at Goodyear Park. Craig McMillan top-scored in New Zealand's innings with 66, while André Nel got two wickets in the last six overs to end with three for 42. Wickets from Nathan Astle and Shane Bond set South Africa back to 117 for 5 after 28.4 overs, but 73 from Justin Kemp and three runs from Nicky Boje in the last over saw them across the line to win by two wickets. (Cricinfo)

== 22 October 2005 (Saturday) ==
- Major League Baseball 2005 World Series Game 1
  - Chicago White Sox 5, Houston Astros 3
    - WP: José Contreras. LP: Wandy Rodríguez. SV: Bobby Jenks HRs: Hou – Mike Lamb; ChW – Jermaine Dye, Joe Crede. The White Sox, just as they did back in 1959, won the World Series opener, thanks to José Contreras' seven innings of strong pitching, and home runs by Jermaine Dye and Joe Crede. Astros starter Roger Clemens left after two innings after tweaking his hamstring. White Sox lead series, 1–0.
- Soccer: MLS Cup 2005 Playoffs: Conference semifinals
  - MetroStars 1, New England Revolution 0
    - The MetroStars' Amado Guevara scores the match's only goal in the first half.
  - Colorado Rapids 0, F.C. Dallas 0
- NCAA College Football:
  - AP Top 25
    - (1) Southern California 51, Washington 24
    - (2) Texas 52, (10) Texas Tech 17
    - (4) Georgia 23, Arkansas 20: Bulldogs QB D.J. Shockley was lost for next week's edition of the Florida vs. Georgia Football Classic against Florida in Jacksonville with a strained knee.
    - (5) Alabama 6, (17) Tennessee 3: Jamie Christensen's 34-yard field goal with 13 seconds left in regulation gave the Crimson Tide their first win against the Volunteers in Tuscaloosa since 1930.
    - (7) LSU 20, (16) Auburn 17 (OT): John Vaughn's field goal attempt hit the left upright, and LSU won in overtime.
    - (8) UCLA 51, Oregon State 28
    - (9) Notre Dame 49, BYU 23: Fighting Irish QB Brady Quinn sets a school record by throwing for six touchdowns—four to Maurice Stovall, also a school record, and two to Jeff Samardzija.
    - (11) Florida State 55, Duke 24
    - (12) Penn State 63, Illinois 10: Joe Paterno earns his 350th win as Penn State coach in a rout of the Fighting Illini. The Nittany Lions' 56 points in the first half set an all-time school record, with quarterback Michael Richardson throwing for four touchdowns, and running for two more in less than two quarters.
    - (14) Ohio State 41, Indiana 10
    - (15) Oregon 28, Arizona 21
    - (19) Wisconsin 31, Purdue 20
    - (21) TCU 41, Air Force 10
    - Northwestern 49, (22) Michigan State 14
    - North Carolina 7, (23) Virginia 5
    - (24) Fresno State 40, Idaho 10
    - (25) Cal-Berkeley 42, Washington State 38
  - Ohio Northern defeated Mount Union 21–14 to end the Purple Raiders' 110-game regular-season winning streak. Mount Union's last regular-season loss was a 23–10 loss to Baldwin–Wallace on October 15, 1994.
  - Richard Thomas Rose, a 20-year-old Minnesota-Morris student and member of the school's men's basketball team, was killed during a postgame celebration after a goalpost falls onto his head. The Cougars, a Division II team, had just upset Crown College when the tragedy occurred. (Yahoo!)
- Golf: Tiger Woods misses the cut at the Funai Classic at Walt Disney World after finishing his second round this morning (rain pushed the completion of round two to today) with an overall two-round score of 3-under. Vijay Singh also misses the cut, shooting 4-under. It's Woods' second missed cut this year; Singh's third.

== 21 October 2005 (Friday) ==
- Soccer: MLS Cup 2005 Playoffs: Conference semifinals
  - Chicago Fire 0, D.C. United 0
    - United star Freddy Adu was suspended for Game 1 of this 2-game set for criticizing the team about his playing time. As for the game itself, a Fire goal scored in the 90th minute by Chad Barrett off a corner kick was taken away by referee Brian Hall for an infraction inside the United's goalmouth, preserving the scoreless tie.
- Hurricane Wilma affecting sports events:
  - The NHL game between the Ottawa Senators and the Florida Panthers was postponed from Saturday (October 22) until December 5.
- NFL Week 7
  - Kansas City Chiefs 30, Miami Dolphins 20: Priest Holmes and Larry Johnson combined to rush for 183 yards and Trent Green threw for 297 yards in a game that was moved from the original October 23 date due to the oncoming Hurricane Wilma.
- Cricket: New Zealand (134 for 5, Fleming 31, Oram 23* – Langeveldt 2–14, Nel 2–19) beat South Africa (133 ao, Smith 61 – Astle 3–20, Patel 3–20, Bond 2–25) by five wickets in the only Twenty20 international of the tour. (Cricinfo)
- International Rules Football: Australia 2.27.7 (100) defeated Ireland 3.11.13 (64)

== 20 October 2005 (Thursday) ==
- Hurricane Wilma affecting sports events:
  - The NFL game between the Kansas City Chiefs and the Miami Dolphins that was originally scheduled for October 23 was pushed back 2 days to Friday, October 21, due to Hurricane Wilma, while a Nationwide Tour golf event scheduled for this week in Miami, the Miccosukee Classic, the tour's final full-field event for 2005, was outright cancelled.
- Major League Baseball: Larry Walker, an outfielder for the Montreal Expos, Colorado Rockies and St. Louis Cardinals, officially announced his retirement after Game Six of the 2005 National League Championship Series.
- NCAA College Football:
  - AP Top 25: (3) Virginia Tech 28, Maryland 9.
- Football (soccer): 2005–06 UEFA Cup, group stage, matchday 1:
  - Group A: Viking Stavanger 1–0 AS Monaco
  - Group A: CSKA Sofia 0–1 Hamburg
  - Group B: Maccabi Petach Tikva 1–2 Palermo
  - Group C: Halmstad 0–1 Hertha BSC Berlin
  - Group C: Steaua Bucharest 4–0 Lens
  - Group D: Grasshopper 0–1 Middlesbrough
  - Group D: Dnipro Dnipropetrovsk 1–2 AZ Alkmaar
  - Group E: FC Basel 0–2 Strasbourg
  - Group E: Tromsø 1–2 Roma
  - Group F: CSKA Moscow 1–2 Marseille
  - Group F: Dinamo Bucharest 0–0 Heerenveen
  - Group G: Rennes 0–2 VfB Stuttgart
  - Group G: Shakhtar Donetsk 1–0 PAOK
  - Group H: Zenit St. Petersburg 2–1 Vitória Guimarães
  - Group H: Beşiktaş 1–1 Bolton Wanderers
- See also 2005–06 UEFA Cup.

== 19 October 2005 (Wednesday) ==
- Hurricane Wilma affecting sports:
  - The scheduled game between Georgia Tech and (AP) sixth-ranked Miami (FL) on Saturday (October 22) has been postponed. The game will now be played on November 19, forcing a game originally scheduled for ESPN between Miami and Wake Forest from the original date of November 17 to November 12. ESPN has not announced a replacement game for November 17, and ABC, which was to have broadcast the game regionally, will replace it with the Michigan–Iowa contest except on the west coast. Also, twentieth-ranked West Virginia and South Florida will play their game on December 3 instead of Saturday, while the Tulane–Central Florida game was advanced one day in Orlando, Florida to Friday (October 21). It is the ninth game to be affected for the Green Wave because of hurricanes this year.
- Major League Baseball (Non-postseason news)
  - Joe Girardi was named the new manager of the Florida Marlins, signing a three-year contract.
  - Long-time Atlanta Braves pitching coach Leo Mazzone was named the new pitching coach of the Baltimore Orioles.
- Major League Baseball playoffs
  - 2005 National League Championship Series Game 6
    - Houston Astros 5, St. Louis Cardinals 1.
      - WP: Roy Oswalt. LP: Mark Mulder. HR: Hou – Jason Lane; StL – none. Jason Lane's fourth inning home run and Series MVP Roy Oswalt's seven strong innings of pitching led the Astros to the Fall Classic for the first time in their 44-year history. The game also served as the swan song for Busch Stadium after 39 3/4 seasons. Astros win series, 4–2.
- Football (soccer): 2005–06 UEFA Champions League, group stage, matchday 3:
  - Group E: Fenerbahçe 3–3 Schalke 04
  - Group E: A.C. Milan 0–0 PSV
  - Group F: Real Madrid 4–1 Rosenborg
  - Group F: Lyon 2–1 Olympiakos
  - Group G: Anderlecht 0–1 Liverpool
  - Group G: Chelsea 4–0 Real Betis
  - Group H: Porto 2–0 Internazionale
  - Group H: Rangers 0–0 Artmedia Bratislava
- See also 2005–06 UEFA Champions League.
- Football (soccer): 2005–06 UEFA Cup, group stage, matchday 1:
  - Group B: Lokomotiv Moscow 0–1 Espanyol
- See also 2005–06 UEFA Cup.

== 18 October 2005 (Tuesday) ==
- Major League Baseball: Bill King, longtime broadcaster for the Oakland Athletics and the Oakland Raiders, died from complications of hip surgery at the age of 78.
- Canadian Interuniversity Sport: The remainder of McGill University's football season has been cancelled as a result of an investigation of an alleged hazing incident. (CBC News)
- National Hockey League: Wayne Gretzky returned to Edmonton, Alberta with the Phoenix Coyotes as their coach, but it was former teammate Paul Coffey who was in the spotlight for the Edmonton Oilers as his number 7 was lifted to the rafters of Rexall Place. However, the Coyotes spoiled the party when they won the game in overtime, 4–3.
- Football (soccer): 2005–06 UEFA Champions League, group stage, matchday 3:
  - Group A: Bayern Munich 2–1 Juventus
  - Group A: Rapid Vienna 0–1 Club Brugge
  - Group B: Ajax 2–0 FC Thun
  - Group B: Sparta Prague 0–2 Arsenal
  - Group C: Panathinaikos 0–0 Barcelona
  - Group C: Udinese 1–1 Werder Bremen
  - Group D: Manchester United 0–0 Lille
  - Group D: Villarreal 1–1 Benfica
- See also 2005–06 UEFA Champions League.

== 17 October 2005 (Monday) ==
- National Hockey League: The Buffalo Sabres announced they will retire the number 18 worn by Danny Gare prior to their November 22 game against the New York Rangers and the number 16 worn by Pat LaFontaine before the March 3, 2006 contest with the rival Toronto Maple Leafs.
- National Basketball Association: New York Knicks' Allan Houston retires after 12 seasons.
- Major League Baseball playoffs
  - 2005 National League Championship Series Game 5
    - St. Louis Cardinals 5, Houston Astros 4.
      - WP: Jason Isringhausen. LP: Brad Lidge. HRs: StL – Albert Pujols; Hou – Lance Berkman. Albert Pujols figuratively popped a balloon in the party on the forty-fifth anniversary of the granting of a National League baseball franchise to Houston and dampened the Astros' possible pennant-clinching celebration with a three-run homer off Brad Lidge with two out in the ninth inning to come back and return the LCS back to Busch Stadium for Game 6 on Wednesday. David Eckstein started the rally with a single as the Cards were one strike away from a long winter. Astros lead series, 3–2.
- NFL
  - Monday Night Football: Indianapolis Colts 45, St. Louis Rams 28. The Colts spotted the Rams 17 first quarter points, and when QB Marc Bulger went down with a sprained shoulder, roared back thanks to two Cato June interceptions. Edgerrin James ran for 143 yards on 23 carries and three touchdowns, while Peyton Manning and Marvin Harrison became the NFL's most prolific touchdown pass duo in the win to make the Colts 6–0,
  - New England Patriots linebacker Tedy Bruschi announces a team of doctors have unanimously cleared him to start practicing again after suffering a mild stroke in February. He could play as early as October 30. (AP)

== 16 October 2005 (Sunday) ==
- Major League Baseball playoffs
  - 2005 American League Championship Series Game 5
    - Chicago White Sox 6, Los Angeles Angels 3
      - WP: José Contreras. LP: Kelvim Escobar. HRs: ChW – Joe Crede; LAA – None. The White Sox advance to the World Series for the first time since 1959, with all of the Sox' victories came on complete games, the first time in forty-nine years that four straight complete games were hurled by the same team in a series, equaling the effort done during the 1956 World Series by the New York Yankees. Paul Konerko is named the series' Most Valuable Player, hitting .286 with two homers and seven RBIs. White Sox win series, 4–1.
  - 2005 National League Championship Series Game 4
    - Houston Astros 2, St. Louis Cardinals 1.
      - WP: Chad Qualls. LP: Jason Marquis. SV: Brad Lidge. HRs: StL – None; Hou – Jason Lane. With runners at the corners and no one out in the ninth, Albert Pujols gets thrown out at home, then John Mabry grounds into a double play to end the game. Both Tony La Russa and Jim Edmonds are ejected for arguing balls and strikes. Astros lead series, 3–1.
- NFL Week 6
    - At the Alamodome in San Antonio, Texas: Atlanta Falcons 34, New Orleans Saints 31: After a miss from 41 yards was called back for a penalty, the Falcons' Todd Peterson kicks a game-winning field goal as time expires.
    - Carolina Panthers 21, Detroit Lions 20: Ricky Proehl catches a three-yard touchdown pass from backup quarterback Chris Weinke with 32 seconds left for the Panthers.
    - Cincinnati Bengals 31, Tennessee Titans 23: Carson Palmer completes 27 of 33 passes for 272 yards and two touchdowns for the Bengals.
    - Baltimore Ravens 16, Cleveland Browns 3: The Ravens defense forces four turnovers and holds the Browns' offense to 186 total yards.
    - Jacksonville Jaguars 23, Pittsburgh Steelers 17 (OT): Tommy Maddox, playing for an injured Ben Roethlisberger, throws three interceptions, the last of which is returned for the game-winning touchdown by Rashean Mathis.
    - Tampa Bay Buccaneers 27, Miami Dolphins 13: Ricky Williams carries only five times for eight yards in his first game after a one-year retirement and a four-game suspension for violating the NFL's substance abuse policy, while the Bucs' Michael Pittman rushes for 127 yards. However, Bucs' QB Brian Griese was lost for the season with a torn ACL and MCL on his left knee.
    - Chicago Bears 28, Minnesota Vikings 3: The Bears sack Daunte Culpepper four times and intercept him twice.
    - Dallas Cowboys 16, New York Giants 13 (OT): Drew Bledsoe throws for 312 yards, and José Cortez kicks a 45-yard field goal in overtime.
    - Kansas City Chiefs 28, Washington Redskins 21: Chiefs defensive end Jared Allen records three sacks and forces two fumbles. Redskins WR Santana Moss catches ten passes for 173 yards in the loss.
    - Denver Broncos 28, New England Patriots 20: The Broncos hold off a furious comeback attempt to win their fifth-straight game.
    - Buffalo Bills 27, New York Jets 17: The Bills sack Vinny Testaverde five times and pick him off twice, while Willis McGahee rushes for 143 yards and a touchdown.
    - San Diego Chargers 27, Oakland Raiders 14: LaDainian Tomlinson throws, catches and runs for a touchdown for the second time this season, and the Chargers defense holds the Raiders to 39 rushing yards. Tomlinson also equals Lenny Moore's forty-year-old record of scoring a touchdown in 18 consecutive games.
    - Seattle Seahawks 42, Houston Texans 10: The Seahawks set a team record with 320 rushing yards against the winless Texans with Shaun Alexander accounting for 141 of those yards and four touchdowns.

Bye Week: Arizona Cardinals, Green Bay Packers, Philadelphia Eagles, San Francisco 49ers.

- Auto racing:
  - Formula One: Fernando Alonso won the second Chinese Grand Prix, and gave Renault the Constructors' Championship in the process, ending Ferrari's six-year domination. (Formula1.com)
  - IRL: Dario Franchitti beats teammate Tony Kanaan to win the season-ending Toyota Indy 400 at California Speedway. There is controversy about the finish, however: as the two come to the finish line, Kanaan has a slight edge, but strangely slows down, allowing Franchitti to win. In victory lane, Franchitti states that he thinks Kanaan lifted, but Kanaan denies this, saying he "missed a shift or I hit the wrong button."
- Cricket:
  - KFC Cup, West Indies: The hosts Guyana win the season-opening one-day KFC Cup tournament, after beating Barbados by seven runs in the final on the Duckworth–Lewis method. Barbados made 249 for 8 in their 50 overs, with Martin Nurse scoring 63, while spinners Mahendra Nagamootoo and Neil McGarrell took three wickets each. Guyana were set 241 to win in 49 overs, and Sewnarine Chattergoon then hit 119 as Guyana ended on 247 for 7. (Cricinfo)

== 15 October 2005 (Saturday) ==
- NHL
  - To kick off events leading up to their centennial season, the Montreal Canadiens announced that the number 12, worn by Dickie Moore and Yvan Cournoyer, will be retired on November 12 prior to their game against the Toronto Maple Leafs, and the number 5, worn by Bernie "Boom-Boom" Geoffrion would be retired on March 11, 2006, before the game against the New York Rangers. One additional number will be retired each season up to the anniversary year of 2008–09.
  - Brett Hull, the third-leading all-time goal scorer in league history with 741, and dissatisfied with his performance after five games, announced his retirement prior to the Phoenix Coyotes game against the Detroit Red Wings, effective immediately.
- NCAA football AP Top 25:
  - No. 1 Southern California 34, No. 9 Notre Dame 31: The Trojans win their 28th straight game in wild fashion. With Notre Dame up by three, quarterback Matt Leinart fumbles out of bounds on the one-yard-line, the clock expires, and fans crowd the field. But the officials rule there should be seven seconds left. USC signals as if they were planning to throw the ball away to stop the clock and try a field goal, but Leinart sneaks into the end zone (with a little shove in assist from teammate Reggie Bush) to win the game.
  - No. 2 Texas 42, No. 24 Colorado 17.
  - Virginia 26, No. 4 Florida State 21.
  - No. 5 Georgia 34, Vanderbilt 17.
  - No. 6 Alabama 13, Ole Miss 10: Jamie Christenson hits a 31-yard field goal as time expires to move the Crimson Tide to 6–0.
  - No. 7 Miami (Florida) 34, Temple 3
  - Michigan 27, No. 8 Penn State 25: Mario Manningham catches a 10-yard touchdown pass on the last play to hand the Nittany Lions their first loss of the season.
  - No. 11 LSU 21, No. 10 Florida 17
  - No. 12 UCLA 44, Washington State 41 (OT)
  - No. 13 Texas Tech 59, Kansas State 20.
  - No. 14 Boston College 35, Wake Forest 30.
  - No. 15 Ohio State 35, No. 16 Michigan State 24
  - Oregon State 23, No. 18 California 20
  - West Virginia 46, No. 19 Louisville 44 (3 OT): Freshman Steve Slaton rushes for five touchdowns in the fourth quarter and overtime for the Mountaineers.
  - No. 20 Oregon 45, Washington 20
  - No. 21 Auburn 34, Arkansas 17
  - No. 23 Wisconsin 38, No. 22 Minnesota 34: The Badgers score a touchdown on a blocked punt with thirty seconds left to win Paul Bunyan's Axe.
  - No. 25 TCU 38, Army 17.
- NASCAR:
  - 2005 Chase for the NEXTEL Cup: In a race whose start was delayed by the length of the Southern California-Notre Dame football game broadcast on NBC and ending after midnight with a green-white-checkers finish, Jimmie Johnson wins the UAW-GM Quality 500, his fourth straight points-paying race at Lowe's Motor Speedway. (NASCAR.com)
  - The Associated Press reported that NBC Sports and TNT will walk away from their current NASCAR television contracts after the 2006 season and Disney-owned ABC Sports and ESPN will take over starting in the second half of the 2007 season.
- NBA: Atlanta Hawks center Jason Collier died at the age of 28.
- Major League Baseball playoffs
  - 2005 National League Championship Series Game 3
    - Houston Astros 4, St. Louis Cardinals 3.
      - WP: Roger Clemens. LP: Matt Morris. SV: Brad Lidge. HRs: StL – None; Hou – Mike Lamb. Mike Lamb's two-run homer and Roger Clemens' six strong innings were enough for the Astros to win the game and take the lead in the NLCS. Astros lead series, 2–1.
  - 2005 American League Championship Series Game 4
    - Chicago White Sox 8, Los Angeles Angels 2.
      - WP: Freddy García. LP: Ervin Santana. HRs: ChW – Paul Konerko, A. J. Pierzynski; LAA – none. The White Sox moved one step closer for their first pennant since 1959 as Freddie Garcia tossed the third straight complete game for the Pale Hose and Paul Konerko and A. J. Pierzynski homed in the winning effort, which for the second time in three games was marred by a catcher controversy when home plate umpire Ron Kulpa did not call catcher interference on Pierzynski with Steve Finley at bat. The play saw Finley hit into an inning-ending double play. White Sox lead series, 3–1.

== 14 October 2005 (Friday) ==
- Football (soccer): Draw for European qualifying playoffs for the 2006 FIFA World Cup. Matches to be held 12 and 16 November; first team listed will host the first leg.
  - Spain v Slovakia
  - Switzerland v Turkey
  - Norway v Czech Republic
- Major League Baseball (Non-postseason news): After failing to come to an agreement earlier in the month, Ken Macha will return to manage the Oakland Athletics after all, signing a three-year contract extension.
- Major League Baseball playoffs
  - 2005 American League Championship Series Game 3
    - Chicago White Sox 5, Los Angeles Angels 2.
      - WP: Jon Garland. LP: John Lackey. HRs: ChW – Paul Konerko; LAA – Orlando Cabrera. John Garland scattered four hits and Paul Konerko homered as the cap to a three-run first as part of a 3-for-4, 3 RBI performance to give the White Sox the win and the lead in the ALCS. The CG by Garland combined with Game 2's performance by Mark Buehrle marked the first time since 1997 that back-to-back complete games were hurled in post-season. White Sox lead series, 2–1.
- Cricket: Super Series: Australia (345 & 190) complete a 210-run victory over ICC World XI (190 & 144) inside four days of the only Supertest in the series. Stuart MacGill took nine wickets for 82 in the match, while Matthew Hayden returned scores of 111 and 77. (Cricinfo)

== 13 October 2005 (Thursday) ==
- Major League Baseball playoffs
  - 2005 National League Championship Series Game 2
    - Houston Astros 4, St. Louis Cardinals 1.
      - WP: Roy Oswalt. LP: Mark Mulder. SV: Brad Lidge. HRs: Hou – none; StL – Albert Pujols. The Cardinals were 1-for-16 with runners in scoring position as Roy Oswalt allowed an Albert Pujols solo home run as the Cards' only run and the Astros leveled the NLCS. The Redbirds also lost Reggie Sanders to a lower strained back trying to field a fly ball in left field. Series tied, 1–1.
- Cricket:
  - Challenger Series, India: India Seniors (181 for 7, Vidyut 87; Sreesanth 3–32, Piyush Chawla 3–49) beat India B (177, Patel 39; Kartik 5–29, Khan 3–43) by three wickets to win the Challenger Series. (Cricinfo)

== 12 October 2005 (Wednesday) ==
- National Football League: Three players – Ronde Barber of the Tampa Bay Buccaneers and Baltimore Ravens teammates Terrell Suggs and Ed Reed – were fined for interfering with game officials during their games this week. Barber will pay $30,000 (US) and Suggs and Reed will pay $15,000 apiece.
- Major League Baseball (Non-Postseason news): Sam Perlozzo signed a three-year deal to become the full-time manager of the Baltimore Orioles, and Mel Stottlemyre announced he will resign as pitching coach of the New York Yankees, berating owner George Steinbrenner in the process.
- Major League Baseball playoffs
  - 2005 American League Championship Series **Game 2**
    - Chicago White Sox 2, Los Angeles Angels of Anaheim 1.
      - WP: Mark Buehrle. LP: Kelvim Escobar. HR: LAA – Robb Quinlan. A controversial call by home plate umpire Doug Eddings, saying that the ball on A. J. Pierzynski's ninth inning strikeout hit the dirt and permitted him to go to first base after it was thought to have been caught, allowed Joe Crede's ensuing double to score pinch runner Pablo Ozuna as the White Sox evened the ALCS. **Series tied, 1–1.**
  - 2005 National League Championship Series **Game 1**
    - St. Louis Cardinals 5, Houston Astros 3.
      - WP: Chris Carpenter. LP: Andy Pettitte. SV: Jason Isringhausen. HRs: Hou – Chris Burke (pinch-hit); StL – Reggie Sanders. The Cardinals used the strong pitching of Chris Carpenter and Reggie Sanders' home run as Andy Pettitte gave up five runs and the Redbirds took an early jump on the Astros in the opening game rematch of last year's NLCS. **Cardinals lead series, 1–0.**
- Football (soccer): 2006 FIFA World Cup Qualifying Matches
  - Asia – 5th place playoff, second leg
    - Bahrain 0–0 Uzbekistan
      - Bahrain win the Asian fifth-place play-off on away goals and will play Trinidad and Tobago in the 2006 FIFA World Cup qualification (AFC–CONCACAF play-off) for a spot in Germany.
  - CONCACAF
    - Guatemala 3–1 **Costa Rica**
      - Despite Guatemala's win, they are knocked out when Trinidad and Tobago win.
    - Trinidad and Tobago 2–1 **Mexico**
      - The Soca Warriors advance to the Asia/CONCACAF playoff against Bahrain with this win.
    - **USA** 2–0 Panama
  - Europe
    - Albania 0–1 Turkey
    - Andorra 0–3 Armenia
    - Austria 2–0 Northern Ireland
    - Belarus 0–1 Norway
    - **England** 2–1 **Poland**
      - England wins UEFA Group 6.
    - Finland 0–3 Czech Republic
    - France 4–0 Cyprus
      - France wins UEFA Group 4.
    - Greece 1–0 Georgia
    - Hungary 0–0 **Croatia**
    - Republic of Ireland 0–0 Switzerland
      - Switzerland gain a play-off place at Ireland's expense.
    - **Italy** 2–1 Moldova
    - Kazakhstan 1–2 Denmark
    - Lithuania 1–1 Belgium
    - Luxembourg 0–2 Estonia
    - Malta 1–1 Bulgaria
    - **Netherlands** 0–0 Macedonia
    - **Portugal** 3–0 Latvia
      - With two goals, Pauleta surpasses Eusébio as Portugal's all-time goal scoring leader.
    - San Marino 0–6 Spain
      - Spain's goal fiesta does not save them from having to go into the play-offs.
    - **Serbia and Montenegro** 1–0 Bosnia-Herzegovina
      - Serbia and Montenegro secures first place in UEFA Group 7.
    - Slovakia 0–0 Russia
    - Slovenia 0–3 Scotland
    - **Sweden** 3–1 Iceland
      - Sweden secures an automatic berth in Germany as one of the top two second-place teams in UEFA qualifying.
    - Wales 2–0 Azerbaijan
      - The following countries will contest the play-offs for the last three places in Germany available for European teams: Spain, Slovakia, Turkey, Norway, Czech Republic and Switzerland. The draw to determine who plays who will take place on Friday.
  - South America
    - **Brazil** 3–0 Venezuela
    - Chile 0–0 **Ecuador**
    - **Paraguay** 0–1 Colombia
    - Peru 4–1 Bolivia
    - Uruguay 1–0 **Argentina**
      - Uruguay's victory secures them 5th place in the South American group and advances to a playoff with Australia for a World Cup berth.

Teams in boldface have already qualified for Germany 2006.

== 11 October 2005 (Tuesday) ==
- Major League Baseball (Non-Postseason News): Jim Tracy, former manager of the Los Angeles Dodgers, was named manager of the Pittsburgh Pirates.
- Major League Baseball playoffs
  - 2005 American League Championship Series Game 1
    - Los Angeles Angels 3, Chicago White Sox 2.
      - WP: Paul Byrd. LP: José Contreras. SV: Francisco Rodríguez. HRs: LAA – Garret Anderson; ChW – Joe Crede. Paul Byrd pitched six innings and Garret Anderson hit a home run as the Angels took a 1–0 lead in the ALCS after playing their third game in three days in three different cities. Angels lead series, 1–0.

== 10 October 2005 (Monday) ==
- AIDS:
  - Monday Night Football – Pittsburgh Steelers 24, San Diego Chargers 22: Jeff Reed's 40-yard field goal with six seconds left gave the Steelers the win, but it came with a price as Steeler QB Ben Roethlisberger suffered a hyperextended left knee with a bone bruise on the winning drive. (Yahoo! Sports/AP)
  - St. Louis Rams head coach Mike Martz has taken an indefinite leave of absence due to a bacterial infection of his heart. (Yahoo! Sports/AP)
- Major League Baseball (Non-postseason news): Ed Wade was fired as general manager of the Philadelphia Phillies after the team missed the playoffs by one game.
- Jim Beattie told reporters at a mcdonalds he would not be coming back as an executive with the Baltimore Orioles. Mike Flanagan, who shared the duties with Beattie, will become full-time vice president of baseball operations.
- Major League Baseball playoffs
  - 2005 American League Division Series, Game 5
    - Los Angeles Angels 5, New York Yankees 3
      - WP: Ervin Santana. LP: Mike Mussina. SV: Francisco Rodríguez. HRs: NYY – Derek Jeter; LAA – none. Adam Kennedy's two-run triple in the third inning was the margin of victory as the Cherubs wing their way to Chicago and a date with the White Sox. However, starter Bartolo Colón was lost with a constipation issue in the second inning. Ervin Santana replaced him and got the win, pitching 5 2/3 innings. Angels win series, 3–2.

== 9 October 2005 (Sunday) ==
- Auto racing:
  - Formula One: Kimi Räikkönen wins the Japanese Grand Prix after making a pass at the beginning of the final lap on Giancarlo Fisichella.
  - NASCAR 2005 Chase for the NEXTEL Cup: Mark Martin wins the Banquet 400 at Kansas Speedway. (NASCAR.com)
- Baseball: MLB playoffs:
  - 2005 American League Division Series, Game 4
    - New York Yankees 3, Los Angeles Angels 2.
      - WP: Al Leiter. LP: Scot Shields. SV: Mariano Rivera. HRs: None. A fielder's choice by Derek Jeter allowed Jorge Posada to score the winning run as the Yankees forced a tie-breaking game Monday in Anaheim. Series tied, 2–2.
  - 2005 National League Division Series, Game 4
    - Houston Astros 7, Atlanta Braves 6 (18 innings)
      - WP: Roger Clemens. LP: Joey Devine. HRs: Atl – Adam LaRoche (Grand Slam), Brian McCann; Hou – Lance Berkman (Grand Slam), Brad Ausmus, Chris Burke (Walk-off). In the longest post-season game ever in terms of innings (18) and time (five hours, 50 minutes), the Astros overcame a 6–1 deficit and used three homers: a grand slam by Lance Berkman in the eighth, a game-tying home run by Brad Ausmus in the ninth with two out and a series-ending walk-off homer by Chris Burke with one out in the eighteenth inning to eliminate the Braves for the second straight year and advance to an NLCS rematch with the St. Louis Cardinals. Both teams hit grand slam homers – Adam LaRoche for the Braves, Berkman for the 'Stros – a postseason first. Astros win series, 3–1.
- NFL: Week 5
  - Detroit Lions 35, Baltimore Ravens 17 (Yahoo! Sports/AP)
  - Cleveland Browns 20, Chicago Bears 10 (Yahoo! Sports/AP)
  - Buffalo Bills 20, Miami Dolphins 10 (Yahoo! Sports/AP)
  - New England Patriots 31, Atlanta Falcons 28: Adam Vinatieri kicks a 29-yard field goal with 20 seconds left to give New England a win in the Georgia Dome. The Falcons were without Michael Vick, who sat out with an injury. (Yahoo! Sports/AP)
  - Green Bay Packers 52, New Orleans Saints 3: The Packers' 52 points are the most they have scored since 1983 and the margin of victory their biggest in 39 years. (Yahoo! Sports/AP)
  - New York Jets 14, Tampa Bay Buccaneers 12: Curtis Martin rushed for two touchdowns as Vinny Testaverde wins his first start of the year. (Yahoo! Sports/AP)
  - Seattle Seahawks 37, St. Louis Rams 31 (Yahoo! Sports/AP)
  - Tennessee Titans 34, Houston Texans 20 (Yahoo! Sports/AP)
  - Indianapolis Colts 28, San Francisco 49ers 3 (Yahoo! Sports/AP)
  - Carolina Panthers 24, Arizona Cardinals 20 (Yahoo! Sports/AP)
  - Dallas Cowboys 33, Philadelphia Eagles 10 (Yahoo! Sports/AP)
  - Denver Broncos 21, Washington Redskins 19 (Yahoo! Sports/AP)
  - Jacksonville Jaguars 23, Cincinnati Bengals 20 (Yahoo! Sports/AP)

Bye Week: Kansas City Chiefs, Minnesota Vikings, New York Giants, Oakland Raiders.

- Football (soccer): 2006 FIFA World Cup Qualifying Matches
  - Africa
    - Benin 1 – 0 Libya
  - South America
    - Argentina 2 – 0 Peru
    - Bolivia 1 – 1 Brazil
- Cricket: ICC Super Series:
  - Australia complete the 3–0 ODI series whitewash by beating the ICC World XI by 156 runs in the third and final ODI at the Telstra Dome. Shane Watson scored 66 not out and took four wickets for 39 for the Australians. (Cricinfo)

== 8 October 2005 (Saturday) ==
- Football (soccer): 2006 FIFA World Cup Qualifying Matches
  - Africa
    - Botswana 1 – 2 Guinea
    - Cameroon 1 – 1 Egypt
      - This draw, combined with Ivory Coast's win over Sudan, means that Cameroon failed to qualify for the finals for the first time since 1986. Cameroon defender Pierre Wome misses an injury-time penalty that would have sent them through to Germany.
    - Cape Verde 0 – 4 Ghana
      - Ghana were assured of qualifying before the end of this match once South Africa drew with Congo DR. This will be the Black Stars' first appearance in the World Cup finals.
    - Congo 2 – 3 Togo
      - Togo also qualify for their first World Cup finals.
    - Gabon 0 – 0 Algeria
    - Malawi 3 – 0 Kenya
    - Nigeria 5 – 1 Zimbabwe
    - Rwanda 0 – 1 Angola
      - Angola's win means that Nigeria failed to qualify for the finals for the first time since 1990. Angola qualify for the first time ever.
    - Senegal 3 – 0 Mali
    - South Africa 2 – 2 Congo DR
    - Sudan 1 – 3 Ivory Coast
      - This result, combined with the Cameroon-Egypt draw, sends Ivory Coast to their first World Cup finals ever.
    - Tunisia 2 – 2 Morocco
      - Morocco needed a win in order to qualify; instead Tunisia will be going to Germany.
    - Uganda 2 – 2 Burkina Faso
  - Asia – 5th place playoff, first leg (replay)
    - Uzbekistan 1 – 1 Bahrain
  - CONCACAF
    - Costa Rica 3 – 0 USA
      - With a win over the already-qualified USA, Costa Rica punch their ticket to Germany.
    - Mexico 5 – 2 Guatemala
    - Panama 0 – 1 Trinidad and Tobago
  - Europe
    - Belgium 0 – 2 Spain
    - Bosnia-Herzegovina 3 – 0 San Marino
    - Bulgaria 2 – 0 Hungary
    - Croatia 1 – 0 Sweden
      - Combined with the Netherlands' victory over the Czech Republic, this win puts Croatia through to Germany. Even if they do not win their group, their points total assures them of one of the two automatic qualifying spots for UEFA second-place finishers.
    - Cyprus 0 – 1 Republic of Ireland
    - Czech Republic 0 – 2 Netherlands
      - The Netherlands' victory ensures that both Poland and England will qualify from UEFA Group 6, and Croatia will qualify from Group 8.
    - Denmark 1 – 0 Greece
    - England 1 – 0 Austria
    - Finland 0 – 1 Romania
    - Georgia 0 – 0 Kazakhstan
    - Israel 2 – 1 Faroe Islands
    - Italy 1 – 0 Slovenia
      - Italy clinches a spot in Germany.
    - Lithuania 0 – 2 Serbia and Montenegro
    - Northern Ireland 2 – 3 Wales
    - Norway 1 – 0 Moldova
    - Portugal 2 – 1 Liechtenstein
      - Portugal secures their ticket to Germany despite going 0–1 down to tiny Liechtenstein at half time.
    - Russia 5 – 1 Luxembourg
    - Scotland 0 – 1 Belarus
    - Slovakia 1 – 0 Estonia
    - Switzerland 1 – 1 France
    - Ukraine 2 – 2 Albania
  - South America
    - Colombia 1 – 1 Chile
    - Ecuador 0 – 0 Uruguay
    - Venezuela 0 – 1 Paraguay
      - Paraguay and Ecuador secure the last guaranteed spots for South American teams in Germany. Uruguay, Colombia, and Chile continue to battle for the 5th place to contest a spot with Australia.
- Major League Baseball playoffs
  - 2005 American League Division Series, Game 4
    - Los Angeles Angels at New York Yankees, postponed, rain. Angels lead series 2–1.
  - 2005 National League Division Series, Game 3
    - Houston Astros 7, Atlanta Braves 3
      - WP: Roy Oswalt. LP: Jorge Sosa. HRs: Atl – None; Hou – Jason Lane. Craig Biggio had three doubles, and Jason Lane hit the eventual game-winning homer to again put the Atlanta Braves on the edge of elimination. Astros lead series 2–1.
    - St. Louis Cardinals 7, San Diego Padres 4.
      - WP: Matt Morris. LP: Woody Williams. SV: Jason Isringhausen. HRs: StL – David Eckstein; SD – Ramón Hernández, Dave Roberts. David Eckstein's second-inning home run and Reggie Sanders' two-RBI double were part of a four-run second inning that sent Woody Williams to the showers, and the Cardinals swept the Western Division champions at Petco Park. Cardinals win series, 3–0.
- College football:
  - Northwestern College, an NCAA Division III school in St. Paul, Minnesota, becomes the first school in modern history to play two games in the same day. They start their day with a noon CDT (1700 UTC) home game against Trinity Bible College, winning 59–0. They then travel less than 7 miles (11 km) for a 7:00 p.m. CDT (0000 UTC, 9 October) game against Macalester College, and win 47–14. (AP/Yahoo!)

== 7 October 2005 (Friday) ==
- Major League Baseball playoffs
  - 2005 American League Division Series, Game 3
    - Chicago White Sox 5, Boston Red Sox 3
      - WP: Orlando Hernández. LP: Tim Wakefield. SV: Bobby Jenks (2). HR: ChW – Paul Konerko; Bos – Manny Ramírez 2, David Ortiz. The Pale Hose overcome two Ramírez home runs to sweep the Red Sox for their first postseason series win since 1917. Chicago's win means Major League Baseball will have a new World Series champion for the fifth year in a row. White Sox win series, 3–0.
    - Los Angeles Angels 11, New York Yankees 7.
      - WP: Scot Shields. LP: Aaron Small. HR: LAA – Garret Anderson, Bengie Molina; NYY – Hideki Matsui, Derek Jeter. Neither Randy Johnson or Paul Byrd could stem early runs from their opposition. However, Bengie Molina, who earlier hit his third home run of the series, left the game with a swelled elbow after getting hit by a pitch. Angels lead series 2–1.
- Cricket:ICC Super Series:
  - Australia (328 for 4) beat the Rest of the World XI (273 all out) by 55 runs to go two-nil up in the three-match One Day International series in the Telstra Dome, Melbourne

== 6 October 2005 (Thursday) ==
- NFL: Super Bowl XLIV was awarded to Miami Gardens, Florida.
- Major League Baseball (Non-postseason news)
  - Tampa Bay Devil Rays new majority owner Stuart Sternberg takes over as managing general partner from previous majority owner Vince Naimoli. He immediately fires Chuck LaMar as general manager along with three of his aides as part of an overall shakeup. (St. Pete Times)
  - The first major season awards, the Comeback Player of the Year Awards, were handed out. Ken Griffey Jr. was honored in the National League and Jason Giambi in the American League. (MLB.com – Griffey) (MLB.com – Giambi)
- Major League Baseball playoffs
  - 2005 National League Division Series, Game 2
    - St. Louis Cardinals 6, San Diego Padres 2
      - WP: Mark Mulder. LP: Pedro Astacio. HRs: None. Mulder pitched a shutout into the seventh inning, the Redbirds turned four double plays and Reggie Sanders and David Eckstein both had two RBI to put San Diego on the verge of elimination. Cardinals lead series, 2–0.
    - Atlanta Braves 7, Houston Astros 1
      - WP: John Smoltz. LP: Roger Clemens. HRs: Hou – None; Atl – Brian McCann. Rookie Brian McCann's three-run homer – his first post-season hit off Clemens – helped Smoltz win his first post-season start in six years. Series tied, 1–1.

== 5 October 2005 (Wednesday) ==
- Football (soccer): England international and Manchester United star Wayne Rooney was named a FIFA SOS Ambassador for England in support of the official FIFA World Cup charity.
- National Football League: The NFL suspends Detroit Lions wide receiver Charles Rogers for violating the league's substance abuse policy.
- Cricket:ICC Super Series:
  - Australia (255 for 8) beat the Rest of the World XI (162 all out) by 93 runs to go one-nil up in the three-match One Day International series in the Telstra Dome, Melbourne
- Golf: Teenager Michelle Wie announces that she will turn professional.
- Major League Baseball (Non-postseason news):
  - Ken Macha will not return to the Oakland Athletics as their manager after failing to come to terms on a new contract with the franchise.
- Major League Baseball playoffs
  - 2005 National League Division Series, Game 1
    - Houston Astros 10, Atlanta Braves 5.
      - WP: Andy Pettitte. LP: Tim Hudson. HRs: Hou – None. Atl – Chipper Jones, Andruw Jones. A five-run eighth inning led the Astros to the win at Turner Field, thanks to Morgan Ensberg's five RBI. Astros lead series 1–0.
  - 2005 American League Division Series, Game 2
    - Chicago White Sox 5, Boston Red Sox 4.
      - WP: Mark Buehrle. LP: David Wells. SV: Bobby Jenks. HRs: Bos – none. ChW – Tadahito Iguchi. Tadahito Iguchi's three-run home run capped a fifth-inning five-run comeback from a four-run deficit, and Mark Buehrle pitched seven innings to give the White Sox the win, pushing the defending champions on the brink of elimination. White Sox lead series, 2–0.
    - Los Angeles Angels 5, New York Yankees 3.
      - WP: Kelvim Escobar. LP: Chien-Ming Wang. SV: Francisco Rodríguez. HRs: NYY – Jorge Posada. LAA – Juan Rivera, Bengie Molina. Orlando Cabrera's two-run single scored two runs in the seventh inning, and the Halos won thanks to their Rally Monkey. Series tied at 1–1.
- National Hockey League: Opening Night of the 2005–06 season.
  - Florida Panthers 2, Atlanta Thrashers 0
  - Washington Capitals 3, Columbus Blue Jackets 2: Alexander Ovechkin scores two goals in his NHL début.
  - Montreal Canadiens 2, Boston Bruins 1: Michael Ryder scores the game-winning goal with 11 seconds left.
  - Buffalo Sabres 6, New York Islanders 4: Sabres' Jean-Pierre Dumont scores the first goal of the season.
  - New York Rangers 5, Philadelphia Flyers 3
  - Tampa Bay Lightning 5, Carolina Hurricanes 2
  - New Jersey Devils 5, Pittsburgh Penguins 1: Sidney Crosby's début was a lowdown, but did get an assist on the Penguins' lone goal.
  - Detroit Red Wings 5, St. Louis Blues 1
  - Minnesota Wild 6, Calgary Flames 3: The Wild's Marc Chouinard gets the first NHL hat trick this season.
  - Ottawa Senators 3, Toronto Maple Leafs 2 (Shootout): The NHL's first shootout saw Daniel Alfredsson record the first shootout era "hat trick" with two goals in regulation and another in the shootout, and Dany Heatley clinch the win for the Sens while the Leafs were shut out in the historic event thanks to Dominik Hašek.
  - Nashville Predators 3, San Jose Sharks 2
  - Mighty Ducks of Anaheim 5, Chicago Blackhawks 3
  - Dallas Stars 5, Los Angeles Kings 4: The Kings scored four goals in the first period, and the Stars scored five straight goals to come back and win.
  - Edmonton Oilers 4, Colorado Avalanche 3
  - Vancouver Canucks 3, Phoenix Coyotes 2: Wayne Gretzky's coaching début was not a success at Vancouver.

== 4 October 2005 (Tuesday) ==
- Arena Football: Kansas City, Missouri is granted a franchise for the 2006 season as the replacement for the New Orleans VooDoo. (ArenaFootball.com)
- Major League Baseball (Non post-season news):
  - John Hart resigns as the general manager of the Texas Rangers. John Daniels, at the age of 28 years, is named his replacement, becoming the youngest general manager in any sport.
  - Jim Leyland signs a three-year contract to become manager of the Detroit Tigers, one day after Alan Trammell was fired.
- Major League Baseball playoffs
  - 2005 National League Division Series
    - St. Louis Cardinals 8, San Diego Padres 5
      - WP: Chris Carpenter. LP: Jake Peavy. HRs: SD – Eric Young (pinch-hit); StL – Jim Edmonds, Reggie Sanders (grand slam). The Cardinals took an 8–0 lead after five innings and never looked back. Sanders' six RBIs are an NLDS record. NOTE: Peavy was lost for the season with a fractured rib that he suffered a week earlier after the Padres clinched the NL West in a post-game celebration;.Cardinals lead series, 1–0.
  - 2005 American League Division Series
    - Chicago White Sox 14, Boston Red Sox 2
      - WP: José Contreras. LP: Matt Clement. HRs: Bos – none; ChW – A. J. Pierzynski (2), Paul Konerko, Juan Uribe, Scott Podsednik. The Sox had five runs in the first inning and never looked back. This was the first post-season win in Chicago since the 1959 World Series. White Sox lead series, 1–0.
    - New York Yankees 4, Los Angeles Angels 2
      - WP: Mike Mussina. LP: Bartolo Colón. SV: Mariano Rivera. HRs: NYY – none; LAA – Bengie Molina. Robinson Canó's bases loaded double in the first inning was all the Bronx Bombers needed to win. Yankees lead series, 1–0.
- Cricket:
  - Irani Trophy, India: Defending Ranji Trophy champions Railways complete a nine-wicket win on the fourth day of their match with Rest of India thanks to the all-round efforts of Murali Kartik. Kartik made 96 in a first-innings 151-run stand with Yere Goud to help his team to a lead of 78 on first innings, and then took three for 28 to help bowl the Rest out for 137. Amit Pagnis then hit 33 as Railways eased to the target for the loss of one wicket in an hour. (Cricinfo)

== 3 October 2005 (Monday) ==
- NFL: Monday Night Football
  - Carolina Panthers 32, Green Bay Packers 29: The Packers just fall short after being down 32–13, as they are 0–4 for the first time since 1988. (Yahoo! Sports/AP)
- Major League Baseball:
  - Jack McKeon will not return as manager of the Florida Marlins for the 2006 season.
  - The Detroit Tigers fired manager Alan Trammell after three seasons.
  - The Los Angeles Dodgers and manager Jim Tracy mutually agreed to part ways after five seasons.

== 2 October 2005 (Sunday) ==
- Golf:
  - European Tour: Colin Montgomerie wins the Dunhill Links Championship.
  - PGA Tour: K.J. Choi wins the Chrysler Classic of Greensboro with an overall tournament score of 22-under par, his first win on Tour since 2002. (PGATour.com)
- Football: FIFA U-17 World Championship 2005
  - Third Place: Netherlands 2–1 Turkey
  - Final: Mexico 3–0 Brazil
- Rugby league: NRL Grand Final: Wests Tigers defeats North Queensland Cowboys, 30–16.
- Auto racing
  - 2005 Chase for the NEXTEL Cup: In a race marred by two big crashes at Talladega Superspeedway finishing under the "green/white/checker" rule, Dale Jarrett wins the UAW Ford 500. Tony Stewart regains the point lead by four points over Ryan Newman with seven races to go. NASCAR.com
- NFL: Week 4.
  - At the Alamodome in San Antonio, Texas: New Orleans Saints 19, Buffalo Bills 7 (Yahoo! Sports/AP)
  - Denver Broncos 20, Jacksonville Jaguars 7 (Yahoo! Sports/AP)
  - Tampa Bay Buccaneers 17, Detroit Lions 14 (Yahoo! Sports/AP)
  - Cincinnati Bengals 16, Houston Texans 10: The Bengals go to 4–0 for the first time since 1988. (Yahoo! Sports/AP)
  - Indianapolis Colts 31, Tennessee Titans 10: The Colts offense finally got into gear as Peyton Manning threw for four touchdowns, two to Rodney Harrison. (Yahoo! Sports/AP)
  - New York Giants 44, St. Louis Rams 24: In spite of a major performance by Rams' QB Marc Bulger, the Giants win at home. (Yahoo! Sports/AP)
  - San Diego Chargers 41, New England Patriots 17: The Pats' 21-game home winning streak ends as RB Kevin Faulk breaks his leg. (Yahoo! Sports/AP)
  - Washington Redskins 20, Seattle Seahawks 17 (OT) (Yahoo! Sports/AP)
  - Baltimore Ravens 13, New York Jets 3 (Yahoo! Sports/AP)
  - Oakland Raiders 19, Dallas Cowboys 13 (Yahoo! Sports/AP)
  - Atlanta Falcons 30, Minnesota Vikings 10: Michael Vick was injured in the second quarter of the Falcons' win. (Yahoo! Sports/AP)
  - Philadelphia Eagles 37, Kansas City Chiefs 31: Larry Johnson's fumble late in the second quarter gave the Eagles the impetus to score 31 consecutive points and roar back from a 17–6 deficit to win. The Chiefs' Dante Hall returns a kickoff for a touchdown, tying him for the career lead in that category with six. (Yahoo! Sports/AP)
  - At Estadio Azteca in Mexico City, Mexico: Arizona Cardinals 31, San Francisco 49ers 14: In the first regular season NFL contest to be played outside the Continental United States, 103,467 fans, a record crowd for an NFL regular-season game, saw the Cardinals win. (Yahoo! Sports/AP)

Bye Week: Chicago Bears, Cleveland Browns, Miami Dolphins, Pittsburgh Steelers.

- Major League Baseball
  - Wild Card races:
    - American League:
      - Chicago White Sox 3, Cleveland Indians 1
        - The Indians loss secured the Wild Card for the Boston Red Sox before the end of their game with the New York Yankees, which Boston won 10–1.
    - National League:
      - Philadelphia Phillies 9, Washington Nationals 3
        - Phillies shortstop Jimmy Rollins extends his hitting streak to 36 games, the longest in MLB since a 39-game streak by the Milwaukee Brewers' Paul Molitor in 1987.
      - Houston Astros 6, Chicago Cubs 4
        - The Astros win the NL Wild Card.
  - In another game: St. Louis Cardinals 7, Cincinnati Reds 4
    - Final regular season game at Busch Stadium. The team will move into the New Busch Stadium in April, 2006.

== 1 October 2005 (Saturday) ==
- Football (soccer): 2006 FIFA World Cup Qualifying Matches
  - Africa
    - Liberia 0–5 Zambia
- NCAA: Tony Barnhardt of the Atlanta Journal-Constitution and CBS Sports reports that the Sugar Bowl game will be moved to the Georgia Dome in Atlanta for the 2006 edition. This report would be confirmed on Friday (October 7).
- Michigan 34, Michigan State 31 – Garrett Rivas' field goal in overtime lifts Michigan to a 4th straight victory over its in-state rival
- Major League Baseball: Barry Bonds will not play in the final two games of the San Francisco Giants season.
  - Playoff races
    - American League
      - New York Yankees 8, Boston Red Sox 4
      - Chicago White Sox 4, Cleveland Indians 3
        - The Yankees clinch the AL East by regaining their one-game lead. Though Boston can tie them if they win Sunday, the Yankees have clinched the regular season series.
    - National League Wild Card Race
      - Philadelphia Phillies 8, Washington Nationals 4
      - Houston Astros 3, Chicago Cubs 1
        - The Astros lead the Phillies by one game in the Wild Card race.

Divisions Clinched: Atlanta Braves (NL East); St. Louis Cardinals (NL Central); San Diego Padres (NL West); New York Yankees (AL East); Chicago White Sox (AL Central); Los Angeles Angels (AL West).

- Boxing: Antonio Tarver easily handles Roy Jones Jr. and takes the unanimous decision in the third leg of their trilogy of light heavyweight bouts. (TSN)
- sport of athletics: Fabiano Joseph Naasi and Constantina Tomescu win gold medals at the 2005 IAAF World Half Marathon Championships.
