= September 2005 in sports =

<<	September 2005					>>
Su	Mo	Tu	We	Th	Fr	Sa
				1	2	3
4	5	6	7	8	9	10
11	12	13	14	15	16	17
18	19	20	21	22	23	24
25	26	27	28	29	30
India; Sports

This list shows notable sports-related deaths, events, and notable outcomes that occurred in September of 2005.

== 30 September 2005 (Friday) ==
- Major League Baseball playoff races
  - American League
    - Boston Red Sox 5, New York Yankees 3
      - The Red Sox and Yankees are now tied for the AL East lead.
    - Chicago White Sox 3, Cleveland Indians 2 (13 innings)
      - The White Sox clinch home-field advantage throughout the playoffs. The Indians are now one game behind the Red Sox and Yankees for the AL Wild Card.
        - Clinched: Chicago White Sox (AL Central), Los Angeles Angels (AL West).
  - National League Wild Card:
    - Philadelphia Phillies 4, Washington Nationals 3
    - Chicago Cubs 4, Houston Astros 3
      - The wild card gap now stands at one game between the Phillies and the Astros. A combination of two Astros wins and/or Phillies losses will clinch the Wild Card for Houston.
        - All three NL Divisions have been clinched: Atlanta Braves (East), St. Louis Cardinals (Central) and San Diego Padres (West).

== 29 September 2005 (Thursday) ==
- Major League Baseball playoff races
  - American League
    - Chicago White Sox 4, Detroit Tigers 2
      - White Sox clinch the AL Central title, their first since 2000.
    - New York Yankees 8, Baltimore Orioles 4
    - Boston Red Sox 5, Toronto Blue Jays 4
      - Yankees lead in AL East remains one game with a magic number of 4.
    - Cleveland Indians 6, Tampa Bay Devil Rays 0
      - Indians, Red Sox still tied for AL Wild Card lead.
      - Clinched: Los Angeles Angels (AL West)
  - National League Wild Card
    - Philadelphia Phillies: idle
    - Chicago Cubs 3, Houston Astros 2
      - The Astros' magic number to clinch the NL wild card remains at 2.
      - Clinched: Atlanta Braves (NL East); St. Louis Cardinals (NL Central); San Diego Padres (NL West).
  - World Baseball Classic: Major League Baseball announces San Diego's Petco Park will host the event's semifinals and championship game next March.
- Football (soccer): 2005–06 UEFA Cup, first round, second leg. Teams progressing to the group stage shown in bold:
  - Xanthi 0 – 0 **Middlesbrough**
  - Metalurh Donetsk 2 – 2 **PAOK** (PAOK win on away goals)
  - KRC Genk 0 – 1 **Litex Lovech**
  - Mainz 0 – 2 **Sevilla**
  - **Marseille** 0 – 0 Germinal Beerschot (After extra time; Marseille win 4–1 on penalties)
  - Austria Vienna 2 – 1 **Viking Stavanger** (Viking win on away goals)
  - Wisła Kraków 0 – 1 **Vitória Guimarães**
  - Široki Brijeg 0 – 1 **FC Basel**
  - Lokomotiv Plovdiv 1 – 2 **Bolton Wanderers**
  - **Strasbourg** 5 – 0 Grazer AK
  - Partizan Belgrade 2 – 5 **Maccabi Petach Tikva**
  - **Lokomotiv Moscow** 3 – 2 Brann
  - Everton 1 – 0 **Dinamo Bucharest**
  - **Heerenveen** 5 – 0 Baník Ostrava
  - **CSKA Sofia** 1 – 0 Bayer Leverkusen
  - FC Zürich 2 – 1 **Brøndby**
  - **Hertha BSC Berlin** 3 – 1 APOEL
  - **Rapid București** 1 – 0 Feyenoord
  - **Levski Sofia** 1 – 0 Auxerre (Levski win on away goals)
  - Debrecen 0 – 2 **Shakhtar Donetsk**
  - **AZ Alkmaar** 3 – 1 Krylya Sovetov Samara (AZ win on away goals)
  - MyPa 0 – 3 **Grasshopper**
  - Anorthosis 0 – 4 **Palermo**
  - Aris 0 – 0 **Roma**
  - FC Midtjylland 1 – 3 **CSKA Moscow**
  - **Dnipro Dnipropetrovsk** 5 – 1 Hibernian
  - **Espanyol** 2 – 0 Teplice
  - FC København 0 – 1 **Hamburg**
  - AEK 0 – 1 **Zenit St. Petersburg**
  - Dyskobolia Grodzisk 2 – 4 **Lens**
  - Domžale 1 – 0 **VfB Stuttgart**
  - Sporting Lisbon 2 – 3 **Halmstads BK** (After extra time; Halmstads win on away goals)
  - Braga 1 – 1 **Red Star Belgrade** (Red Star win on away goals)
  - **Sampdoria** 1 – 0 Vitória Setúbal
  - Malmö 1 – 4 **Beşiktaş**
  - Osasuna 0 – 0 **Rennes**
  - Willem II 1 – 3 **AS Monaco**
  - **Steaua Bucharest** 3 – 1 Vålerenga
  - Cork City 1 – 2 **Slavia Prague**
  - Galatasaray 1 – 1 **Tromsø**
- See also 2005–06 UEFA Cup.

== 28 September 2005 (Wednesday) ==
- Major League Baseball playoff races:
  - American League
    - Toronto Blue Jays 7, Boston Red Sox 2
    - New York Yankees 2, Baltimore Orioles 1
      - The Yankees lead by one game over the Red Sox.
    - Chicago White Sox 8, Detroit Tigers 2
    - Tampa Bay Devil Rays 1, Cleveland Indians 0
      - The ChiSox' magic number is now one as the White Sox won the season series over the Indians.
      - The Indians and Red Sox are now tied for the AL wild card.
        - Clinched: Los Angeles Angels (AL West)
  - National League
    - Philadelphia Phillies 16, New York Mets 6
    - Houston Astros 7, St. Louis Cardinals 6
      - Astros magic number to clinch NL Wild Card is two.
    - San Diego Padres 9, San Francisco Giants 1
      - Padres clinch the NL West title.
        - Clinched: Atlanta Braves (NL East); St. Louis Cardinals (NL Central).
- Football (soccer)
  - 2005–06 UEFA Champions League, group stage, matchday 2:
    - Group E: Schalke 04 2 – 2 A.C. Milan
    - Group E: Fenerbahçe 3 – 0 PSV
    - Group F: Rosenborg 0 – 1 Lyon
    - Group F: Real Madrid 2 – 1 Olympiakos
      - Real Madrid star Raúl becomes the first player to score 50 goals in European Cup/Champions League play.
    - Group G: Liverpool 0 – 0 Chelsea
    - Group G: RSC Anderlecht 0 – 1 Real Betis
    - Group H: Internazionale 1 – 0 Rangers
    - Group H: Porto 2 – 3 Artmedia Bratislava
      - Champions League newcomers Artmedia come back from 2–0 down.
- See also 2005–06 UEFA Champions League.
  - Lamar Hunt U.S. Open Cup Final
    - Los Angeles Galaxy 1 — 0 FC Dallas

== 27 September 2005 (Tuesday) ==
- Major League Baseball playoff races:
  - American League
    - Boston Red Sox 3, Toronto Blue Jays 1 (Game one of a day-night doubleheader)
    - Toronto Blue Jays 7, Boston Red Sox 5 (Game two of day-night doubleheader)
    - Baltimore Orioles 17, New York Yankees 9
      - Red Sox, Yankees tied again for AL East lead.
    - Detroit Tigers 3, Chicago White Sox 2
    - Tampa Bay Devil Rays 5, Cleveland Indians 4
      - Neither the Chisox or the Tribe gained ground in the AL Central.
    - Los Angeles Angels 4, Oakland Athletics 3
      - Angels clinch the AL West championship.
  - National League
    - Washington Nationals 11, Florida Marlins 1
      - Marlins eliminated from post-season with loss.
    - New York Mets 3, Philadelphia Phillies 2
      - The Phillies' loss gives the NL East to the Atlanta Braves, their 14th straight division title. The Braves defeated the Colorado Rockies, 12–3.
    - Houston Astros 3, St. Louis Cardinals 1
      - Astros extend NL Wild Card lead to 2.5 games over Philadelphia; their magic number to clinch the NL Wild Card is three.
    - San Diego Padres 9, San Francisco Giants 6
      - Padres reduce their magic number for clinching the NL West to two; Barry Bonds hits his 708th career home run in the first inning.
- Football (soccer): 2005–06 UEFA Champions League, group stage, matchday 2:
  - Group A: Bayern Munich 1 – 0 Club Brugge
  - Group A: Juventus 3 – 0 Rapid Vienna
  - Group B: Ajax 1 – 2 Arsenal
  - Group B: FC Thun 1 – 0 Sparta Prague
    - The Swiss underdogs win with an 89th-minute goal
  - Group C: Barcelona 4 – 1 Udinese
    - A hat trick by Ronaldinho
  - Group C: Panathinaikos 2 – 1 Werder Bremen
  - Group D: Lille 0 – 0 Villarreal
  - Group D: Manchester United 2 – 1 Benfica
    - Ruud van Nistelrooy's 47th Champions League goal takes him to 3rd place in the all-time list, behind Alfredo Di Stéfano and Raúl.
- See also 2005–06 UEFA Champions League.
- NFL:
  - The New York Jets sign 41-year-old quarterback Vinny Testaverde after they announce both of their top two QBs, Chad Pennington and Jay Fiedler, will miss the rest of the season with shoulder injuries. (SI/AP)
  - The New England Patriots place safety Rodney Harrison on the injured reserve list, ending his season. Harrison tore three ligaments in his left knee during Sunday's game against the Pittsburgh Steelers. (SI/AP)

== 26 September 2005 (Monday) ==
- College football: Tennessee 30, LSU 27 (OT): Gerald Riggs Jr. completed a comeback by scoring on a one-yard run in overtime to give the 10th-ranked Volunteers a stunning upset over the 4th-ranked Tigers in the first game played after Hurricane Katrina in Baton Rouge which was postponed from Saturday due to Hurricane Rita.
- Major League Baseball playoff races:
  - American League:
    - New York Yankees 11, Baltimore Orioles 3
    - Toronto Blue Jays at Boston Red Sox, rained out
      - The Yankees now lead the AL East by a half-game over the Red Sox, who are now a half-game behind the Cleveland Indians in the AL wild-card race. The rainout will be made up as part of a doubleheader Tuesday.
    - Detroit Tigers 4, Chicago White Sox 3
      - The White Sox' lead over the Indians drops to 2 games.
    - Los Angeles Angels 4, Oakland Athletics 3
      - This result reduces the Angels' magic number in the AL West to 2
  - National League:
    - New York Mets 6, Philadelphia Phillies 5
      - The Mets stay mathematically alive for the NL wild card. The Phillies fall 1.5 games behind the idle Houston Astros for the NL wild card.
    - Washington Nationals 4, Florida Marlins 0
      - The Marlins are now all but eliminated from the wild card race.
    - Colorado Rockies 6, Atlanta Braves 5
      - The Braves' loss prevented them from clinching their 14th consecutive division title. However, one Braves win or one Phillies loss will clinch the NL East for the Braves.
    - San Francisco Giants 3, San Diego Padres 2
      - The Padres' lead over the Giants in the NL West drops to 3 games.
- NFL
  - Monday Night Football: Denver Broncos 30, Kansas City Chiefs 10: The Broncos hold the Chiefs' normally potent running game to 74 yards, and the Chiefs hurt themselves with 118 yards in penalties. Denver wide receiver Rod Smith becomes the first undrafted player to reach 10,000 yards in career receiving. (AP/Yahoo!)
  - Tennessee Titans running back Travis Henry was suspended for four games for violating the NFL's steroid abuse policy.

== 25 September 2005 (Sunday) ==
- Major League Baseball playoff races:
  - American League
    - New York Yankees 8, Toronto Blue Jays 4
    - Boston Red Sox 9, Baltimore Orioles 3
      - New York and Boston remain tied in the AL East with seven games to play.
    - Chicago White Sox 4, Minnesota Twins 1
    - Kansas City Royals 5, Cleveland Indians 4
      - The White Sox move 2.5 games up on the Indians, whose lead over New York and Boston in the wild-card race drops to half a game.
    - Tampa Bay Devil Rays 8, Los Angeles Angels 4
    - Texas Rangers 6, Oakland Athletics 2
      - Oakland's loss reduces the Angels' magic number in the AL West to 4.
  - National League
    - Atlanta Braves 5, Florida Marlins 3
      - Atlanta's magic number in the NL East drops to 2.
    - Philadelphia Phillies 6, Cincinnati Reds 3
    - Chicago Cubs 3 Houston Astros 2
      - Houston's lead in the NL wild-card race falls to one game.
    - San Francisco Giants 6, Colorado Rockies 2
    - Arizona Diamondbacks 4, San Diego Padres 3
      - San Diego's magic number in the NL West remains at 4.
- Motorcycle sport:
  - Valentino Rossi wins his seventh World Championship when he secures the MotoGP championship for the fourth successive year by finishing second in the Malaysian GP. (Superwheels)
- Auto racing:
  - Champ Car World Series: In a race that ends near 2 am US EDT (0600 UTC) on the East Coast, Sébastien Bourdais wins the Las Vegas Hurricane Relief 400 at the Las Vegas Motor Speedway. The only caution of the race occurs late when Bourdais makes contact with then-leader Paul Tracy, who then crashes into the wall in Turn 4. (ChampCar.ws)
  - NASCAR: 2005 Chase for the NEXTEL Cup: Jimmie Johnson wins the MBNA RacePoints 400 at Dover. (NASCAR.com)
  - IndyCar: Scott Dixon wins the Watkins Glen Indy Grand Prix, but Dan Wheldon finished fifth, and clinches the 2005 IRL series championship. (IndyCar.com)
  - Formula 1: Juan Pablo Montoya and Kimi Räikkönen give Team McLaren a 1–2 finish at the 2005 Brazilian Grand Prix at São Paulo.
    - Fernando Alonso, who finishes third, wins the Formula 1 World Championship, becoming its youngest ever champion at 24 years and 58 days.
  - A1 Grand Prix: Nelson Piquet Jr., for A1 Team Brazil wins both the sprint race and feature race of the first ever A1 Grand Prix event, the 2005–06 A1 Grand Prix of Nations, Great Britain at Brands Hatch.
- Basketball:
  - In the final of EuroBasket 2005, Greece defeats Germany 78–62, in a result that to many Greek fans brings back memories of their football team's stunning victory at Euro 2004. Germany and Dallas Mavericks superstar Dirk Nowitzki is named tournament MVP. (Yahoo!)
- NFL Week Three:
  - New England Patriots 23, Pittsburgh Steelers 20: In a rematch of last year's AFC Championship game at Heinz Field, Adam Vinatieri kicks a game-winning 43-yard field goal with one second left after Pittsburgh's Hines Ward scored the tying touchdown on the previous drive. Ben Roethlisberger is sacked four times, while Corey Dillon runs for two touchdowns and Tom Brady completes all twelve of his fourth quarter passes for 163 yards. Patriots safety Rodney Harrison was injured in the first quarter and will miss the rest of the season with a torn ACL, MCL and PCL in his knee and starting offensive lineman Matt Light will be out the rest of the season as well. (Yahoo!/AP)
  - Philadelphia Eagles 23, Oakland Raiders 20: At "The Linc", David Akers, fighting a hamstring injury, kicks the game-winning field goal from 23 yards with nine seconds remaining. Kerry Collins has 345 yards passing and two touchdowns, and Terrell Owens catches a touchdown pass from Donovan McNabb. (Yahoo!/AP)
  - Jacksonville Jaguars 26, New York Jets 20 (OT): Byron Leftwich outdueled fellow Marshall University quarterback Chad Pennington in The Meadowlands and throws a 36-yard touchdown pass to Jimmy Smith 5:12 into overtime to win it for Jacksonville. Pennington and Jets' backup QB Jay Fiedler both suffered injuries, with Pennington likely out for the season due to a torn rotator cuff. (Yahoo!/AP)
  - Indianapolis Colts 13, Cleveland Browns 6: Edgerrin James runs for 100 yards for the first time this season, and the vastly improved Colts defense held their third consecutive team to under 10 points at the RCA Dome. Marvin Harrison and Peyton Manning also break the record for most yardage passing between two teammates with 9,568 yards between them, passing Jim Kelly and Andre Reed, who combined for 9,538 yards with the Buffalo Bills. Manning passes the 30,000 yards passing mark for his career in his 155th contest becoming the second fastest to do so. Only Dan Marino threw for 30,000 yards in his career faster, doing so in 154 games. (Yahoo!/AP)
  - Tampa Bay Buccaneers 17, Green Bay Packers 16: "Cadillac" Williams runs for 158 yards, while Brett Favre throws three interceptions (two to Will Allen) as Tampa Bay wins for the first time at Lambeau Field since 1989. The difference comes when Ryan Longwell misses a point after touchdown, ending his streak at 157 straight PATs made. (Yahoo!/AP)
  - Dallas Cowboys 34, San Francisco 49ers 31: The Cowboys come back from a 12-point deficit at Monster Park in the fourth quarter to win as Keyshawn Johnson catches the go-ahead touchdown with 1:51 remaining from Drew Bledsoe. (Yahoo!/AP)
  - Seattle Seahawks 37, Arizona Cardinals 12: Shaun Alexander runs for four touchdowns, two of which were thirty seconds apart at Qwest Field. Cardinals quarterback Kurt Warner suffers a groin injury and is replaced with Josh McCown. (Yahoo!/AP)
  - Miami Dolphins 27, Carolina Panthers 24: Lance Schulters intercepts Jake Delhomme late in the fourth quarter at Miami to set up Olindo Mare's game-winning 32-yard field goal with four seconds left. Steve Smith catches three touchdown passes for Carolina, while Ronnie Brown of the Dolphins had 132 rushing yards. (Yahoo!/AP)
  - St. Louis Rams 31, Tennessee Titans 27: In their first meeting since Super Bowl XXXIV, Marc Bulger throws three touchdown passes, while Adam Archuleta returns an interception by Steve McNair 85 yards for a score. Both teams combine for seven turnovers. (Yahoo!/AP)
  - Atlanta Falcons 24, Buffalo Bills 16: Falcons QB Michael Vick has two touchdown passes and run for 236 yards as a team. Buffalo's Willis McGahee runs for 160 yards and a touchdown, but the Bills lose linebacker Takeo Spikes with a torn Achilles tendon for the rest of the season. (Yahoo!/AP)
  - Minnesota Vikings 33, New Orleans Saints 16: Daunte Culpepper throws for 300 yards and three touchdowns, one of them on their first play of the game, as the Vikings get their first win of the season against a Saints team that committed fourteen penalties and four turnovers. (Yahoo!/AP)
  - Cincinnati Bengals 24, Chicago Bears 7: The Bengals improve to 3–0 for the first time since 1990 at Soldier Field by intercepting Kyle Orton five times, while Carson Palmer throws for three touchdowns. The five INTs mark the first time since 1971 that an NFL team had five interceptions in three straight games. (Yahoo!/AP)
  - San Diego Chargers 45, New York Giants 23: LaDainian Tomlinson runs for 192 yards and three touchdowns and throws another touchdown to Keenan McCardell as the "Lightning Bolts" win at Qualcomm Stadium. This was Eli Manning's first game in San Diego since the 2004 NFL draft, where he was selected first overall by the Chargers and, unhappy with the team, was immediately traded to the Giants. (Yahoo!/AP)

Bye Week: Baltimore Ravens, Detroit Lions, Houston Texans, Washington Redskins.

== 24 September 2005 (Saturday) ==
- Boxing:
  - Wladimir Klitschko outpoints Samuel Peter over twelve rounds in Atlantic City. aol.com
  - Miguel Cotto comes off the canvas in the second and knocks out Ricardo Torres in round seven to retain his WBO world Jr. Welterweight title, as part of the Klitschko-Peter undercard. aol.com
- Football (soccer): German brewer Bitburg offers 10,000 litres of beer to the supporters of the first team to defeat Bayern Munich in the Bundesliga. The offer will increase by 1,000 litres per match until Bayern lose. Bayern are currently on a fifteen match winning streak. (CNN/SI)
  - Hamburger SV defeats Bayern 2–0. (BBC)
- Australian rules football:
  - The Sydney Swans defeated the West Coast Eagles in a nailbiting AFL Grand Final 8.10 (58) to 7.12 (54), ending the Swans' (both South Melbourne and Sydney incarnations) record 72-year premiership drought. The Eagles' Chris Judd was awarded the Norm Smith Medal for best-on-ground, becoming only the fourth player on the losing team ever to receive that award.

== 22 September 2005 (Thursday) ==
- Cricket:
  - Bangladeshis in Sri Lanka: Sri Lanka (457 for 9 declared) beat Bangladesh (191 & 197) by an innings and 69 runs on the third morning of the second and final Test of the series, giving Bangladesh their fourth successive innings defeat in Test cricket. Sri Lanka thus win the Test series 2–0. (Cricinfo)
  - Indians in Zimbabwe: India (366 & 20/0) beat Zimbabwe (161 & 223) with Irfan Pathan taking 12 for 124 in the match and Gautam Gambhir and Rahul Dravid narrowly missing out on hundreds. For Zimbabwe, Heath Streak took six for 73 in the first innings, while Hamilton Masakadza and Andy Blignaut made half-centuries. This was Zimbabwe's sixth successive Test defeat, but after five innings defeats it was their best result since a draw in Bangladesh in 2004–05. (Cricinfo)

== 21 September 2005 (Wednesday) ==
- NBA:
  - NBA Commissioner David Stern announces that the New Orleans Hornets, displaced by Hurricane Katrina, will play 35 of their 41 regular-season home games in 2005–06, plus any home playoff games, at the Ford Center in Oklahoma City. The remaining six home games will be played at the Pete Maravich Assembly Center on the LSU campus in Baton Rouge. (NBA.com)

== 20 September 2005 (Tuesday) ==
- Golf: Golf World Magazine reports that Michelle Wie will turn pro on October 5.
- WNBA:
  - The Sacramento Monarchs win Game 4 of the WNBA Finals over the Connecticut Sun 62–59 to win their first WNBA title 3–1. Yolanda Griffith is named series MVP. (WNBA.com)
  - Chicago's WNBA franchise, which will begin play in 2006, will be known as the Sky. (Yahoo!)
- Auto racing:
  - Formula One: Jenson Button will stay at BAR–Honda in 2006. The British racer will have to pay £25 million to be released from his Williams contract. Williams is expected to announce its agreement with Button's management within the next week.

== 19 September 2005 (Monday) ==
- NFL: Monday Night Football
  - New York Giants 27, New Orleans Saints 10: The Giants dominate a sloppy Saints team that commits 13 penalties, 11 in the first half, and turns the ball over six times. The Giants' Tiki Barber runs for 83 yards and a touchdown, and catches an Eli Manning TD pass. Saints quarterback Aaron Brooks throws for 375 yards, but is intercepted three times. This game was supposed to have been played in New Orleans, Louisiana at the Louisiana Superdome, but was moved to Giants Stadium in The Meadowlands due to Hurricane Katrina. (AP/Yahoo!)
  - Washington Redskins 14, Dallas Cowboys 13: Trailing 13–0 with four minutes left in the game, the Redskins storm back with Mark Brunell TD passes of 39 and 70 yards to Santana Moss in a span of little more than a minute. The Skins defense holds off the Cowboys to give them their first win at Texas Stadium since 1995. (AP/Yahoo!)
- During this doubleheader, more than $5 million (US) was raised by a telethon on both ESPN and ABC for the efforts of those devastated by Hurricane Katrina.

== 18 September 2005 (Sunday) ==
- Golf
  - HSBC World Match Play Championship : Kiwi Michael Campbell, the 2005 U.S. Open champion, wins the world's richest golf prize of £1,000,000 when defeating Paul McGinley of Ireland 2 and 1 in the final at Wentworth in England.
  - Jason Gore wins his first event on the PGA Tour, the 84 LUMBER Classic. Gore, who had received a "battlefield promotion" from the Nationwide Tour as a reward for winning three tournaments on that tour in 2005, shot a 2-under 70 en route to a 14-under-par final score, one shot ahead of Carlos Franco. (PGATOUR.com)
- Auto racing:
  - NASCAR 2005 Chase for the NEXTEL Cup: Ryan Newman passes Tony Stewart with two laps to go, winning the Sylvania 300, his first win of the season. (NASCAR.com)
  - World Rally Championship – the Wales Rally Great Britain is ended after stage 15 due to the death of co-driver Michael Park. Championship leader Sébastien Loeb deliberately incurs a two-minute penalty to avoid winning the title under the circumstances.
- NFL: Week Two (Designated by the NFL as "Hurricane Relief Weekend" for the benefit of the victims of Hurricane Katrina. Contributions can be made at https://www.bushclintonkatrinafund.org.)
  - Carolina Panthers 27, New England Patriots 17: The Patriots commit three turnovers and Stephen Davis scores three touchdowns in a rematch of Super Bowl XXXVIII. Tom Brady throws his 100th career touchdown pass. (AP/Yahoo!)
  - Indianapolis Colts 10, Jacksonville Jaguars 3: Edgerrin James runs for 128 yards but Rae Carthon scored the game-winning touchdown. Jaguars quarterback Byron Leftwich was injured late in the game, while Peyton Manning failed to throw for a touchdown. (AP/Yahoo!)
  - Philadelphia Eagles 42, San Francisco 49ers 3: Donovan McNabb was 22-for-29 for 356 yards and five touchdowns — two of them to Terrell Owens — in a rout of the 49ers. Top draft pick Alex Smith made his NFL debut in this game and was 0-for-1 in the passing department. (AP/Yahoo!)
  - Pittsburgh Steelers 27, Houston Texans 7: Willie Parker runs for 111 yards while Texans quarterback David Carr is sacked eight times. (AP/Yahoo!)
  - Cincinnati Bengals 37, Minnesota Vikings 8: Chad Johnson catches a 70-yard touchdown on the second play of the game; one of three touchdown passes by Carson Palmer. Daunte Culpepper throws five interceptions. (AP/Yahoo!)
  - Chicago Bears 38, Detroit Lions 6: Lions quarterback Joey Harrington throws five interceptions, one of which was returned for a touchdown by Mike Brown, while Thomas Jones scores two touchdowns for Chicago. (AP/Yahoo!)
  - Tennessee Titans 25, Baltimore Ravens 10: The Titans sack Anthony Wright six times, force two turnovers, and block a punt for a safety. (AP/Yahoo!)
  - Tampa Bay Buccaneers 19, Buffalo Bills 3: Rookie "Cadillac" Williams runs for 128 yards and a touchdown. (AP/Yahoo!)
  - Seattle Seahawks 21, Atlanta Falcons 18: Matt Hasselbeck throws two TD passes and Shaun Alexander runs for a TD to stake the Seahawks to a 21–0 halftime lead. The Seahawks nearly blow the lead, but their defense stops the Falcons late in the fourth quarter to preserve the win. (AP/Yahoo!)
  - St. Louis Rams 17, Arizona Cardinals 12: The Rams' Marc Bulger throws two TD passes, and their defense keeps the Cardinals out of the end zone all four times they advanced inside the Rams 12. Cardinals quarterback Kurt Warner goes 28-for-41 with 307 yards passing against his former team. (AP/Yahoo!)
  - Cleveland Browns 26, Green Bay Packers 24: Both quarterbacks, the Browns' Trent Dilfer and the Packers' Brett Favre, throw for over 300 yards and three TDs apiece, but Favre also throws two interceptions in a closely fought game. Favre becomes the third NFL quarterback, behind Dan Marino and John Elway, to throw for more than 50,000 passing yards. The uniform number 92 of late Packers great Reggie White was retired during halftime ceremonies. (AP/Yahoo!)
  - New York Jets 17, Miami Dolphins 7: The Jets defense holds the Dolphins to 66 yards rushing, and Chad Pennington leads the offense on a fourth-quarter TD drive that seals the win. (AP/Yahoo!)
  - Denver Broncos 20, San Diego Chargers 17: The Broncos come back from a 14–3 halftime deficit, sparked by a Champ Bailey interception return for a TD and a defense that holds the Chargers to 41 yards of offense in the second half. Jason Elam kicks the winning field goal with 5 seconds left. Chargers running back LaDainian Tomlinson scores both Chargers TDs, giving him a rushing TD in 14 consecutive games, an NFL record. (AP/Yahoo!)
  - Kansas City Chiefs 23, Oakland Raiders 17: Trent Green was 18-for-28 for 238 yards, and Priest Holmes carried the ball 19 times for 75 yards and a touchdown, and the rebuilt Chiefs' defense withstood a late game drive by the Raiders in Oakland's home opener. Randy Moss made his official home debut with 5 catches for 127 yards and a touchdown, while Kerry Collins was 21-for-35 and 263 yards along with the Moss touchdown. (AP/Yahoo!)
- College football:
  - The USC Trojans are ranked Number 1 by the AP for the 22nd consecutive poll, breaking the previous record set by the Miami Hurricanes during 2001 and 2002. The streak began with the poll of December 7, 2003. (AP/Yahoo!)

== 17 September 2005 (Saturday) ==
- Major League Baseball:
  - The St. Louis Cardinals clinch the National League Central Division with a 5–1 victory over the Chicago Cubs. St. Louis is the first team to clinch a playoff appearance this year. (AP).
- Boxing:
  - Marco Antonio Barrera unifies his WBC world Jr. Lightweight title with the IBF one by defeating IBF world champion Robbie Peden of Australia by a twelve-round decision; Shane Mosley returns to the ring with a ten-round points victory over Jose Luis Cruz of Mexico and Jesús Chávez wins the IBF world Lightweight title by knocking out Leavander Johnson in eleven rounds, at Las Vegas, Nevada. Johnson later collapses and would die on 22 September in a hospital in Las Vegas. aol.com
  - Julio César Chávez tells promoter Bob Arum he is done with boxing after losing by a fifth-round knockout against Grover Wiley; his son, Julio Jr. beats Corey Alarcon by a second-round knockout, and Jesús González is beaten for the first time, knocked out in round eight by Jose Luis Zertuche, in Phoenix, Arizona. msnbc.com
- Cricket:
  - 2005 English cricket season: Nottinghamshire win the 2005 County Championship with a 204-run win over Kent, their first Championship win since 1987. (Cricinfo)
  - International 20:20 Club Championship: Faisalabad Wolves defeat Chilaw Marians by five wickets to win the first international club tournament in the history of cricket. (Cricinfo)

== 16 September 2005 (Friday) ==
- Baseball: Barry Bonds hits his first home run in 2005 — number 704 in his career — as the San Francisco Giants defeat the Los Angeles Dodgers, 5–4. MLB.com
- Football (soccer): FIFA U-17 World Championship 2005 – Group Stage (FIFA)
  - Group A: China PR 1 – 1 Costa Rica
  - Group A: Peru 1 – 1 Ghana
  - Group B: Uruguay 0 – 2 Mexico
  - Group B: Turkey 1 – 0 Australia
- Basketball: EuroBasket 2005, the 30th continental championships, starts in Belgrade, Serbia and Montenegro.
- Auto racing:
  - Formula One: BMW and Nick Heidfeld will embark on a joint future in the FIA Formula 1 World Championship in 2006. The Munich automobile manufacturer has concluded a three-year contract with the racing driver from Mönchengladbach (28). This fills the first cockpit in the new team run by BMW.
- Cricket:
  - Indian tour of Zimbabwe: India (554) beat Zimbabwe (279 & 185) by an innings and 90 runs. Irfan Pathan is Man of the Match after taking nine wickets for 111 runs and also scoring 52 with the bat. (Cricinfo)
- Ice hockey: The Montreal Canadiens announce that former Montreal Expos mascot Youppi will be their new team mascot, becoming the first mascot in North American professional sports employed in different sports. (TSN)

== 15 September 2005 (Thursday) ==
- Football (soccer): UEFA Cup – First round – first leg (UEFA.com)
  - Middlesbrough 2 – 0 Xanthi
  - PAOK 1 – 1 Metalurh Donetsk
  - Litex Lovech 2 – 2 KRC Genk
  - Sevilla 0 – 0 Mainz
  - Germinal Beerschot 0– 0 Marseille
  - Viking FK 1 – 0 Austria Vienna
  - Vitória Guimarães 3 – 0 Wisła Kraków
  - FC Basel 5 – 0 Široki Brijeg
  - Bolton Wanderers 2 – 1 Lokomotiv Plovdiv
  - Grazer AK 0 – 2 Strasbourg
  - Maccabi Petach Tikva 0 – 2 Partizan Belgrade
  - Brann 1 – 2 Lokomotiv Moscow
  - Dinamo București 5 – 1 Everton
  - Baník Ostrava 2 – 0 Heerenveen
  - Bayer Leverkusen 0 – 1 CSKA Sofia
  - Brøndby 2 – 0 FC Zürich
  - APOEL 0 – 1 Hertha BSC Berlin
  - Feyenoord 1 – 1 Rapid București
  - Auxerre 2 – 1 Levski Sofia
  - Shakhtar Donetsk 4 – 1 Debrecen
  - Krylya Sovetov Samara 5 – 3 AZ Alkmaar
  - Grasshopper 1 – 1 MyPa
  - Palermo 2 – 1 Anorthosis
  - Roma 5 – 1 Aris
  - CSKA Moskva 3 – 1 Midtjylland
  - Hibernian 0 – 0 Dnipro Dnipropetrovsk
  - Teplice 1 – 1 Espanyol
  - Hamburg 1 – 1 FC København
  - Zenit St. Petersburg 0 – 0 AEK
  - Lens 1 – 1 Dyskobolia Grodzisk
  - VfB Stuttgart 2 – 0 Domžale
  - Halmstads BK 1 – 2 Sporting Lisbon
  - Red Star Belgrade 0 – 0 Braga
  - Vitória Setúbal 1 – 1 Sampdoria
  - Beşiktaş 0 – 1 Malmö
  - Rennes 3 – 1 Osasuna
  - AS Monaco 2 – 0 Willem II
  - Vålerenga 0 – 3 Steaua Bucharest
  - Slavia Praha 2 – 0 Cork City
  - Tromsø 1 – 0 Galatasaray
- Cycling:
  - After hinting that he may come out of retirement, seven-time Tour de France champion Lance Armstrong announces that he will remain retired, indicating that he is now preoccupied with addressing recent allegations that he used EPO during his first Tour win in 1999. (AP/Yahoo!)
- Rugby union: Frank Hadden is appointed as the new coach of the Scotland national team.
- NFL: Nine players, five from the Atlanta Falcons and four from the Philadelphia Eagles, are fined amounts between US $2,500 and $5,000 for their roles in a fight before the team's Monday night game on September 12. The Falcons' Chad Lavalais is fined US$7,500 for a helmet-first hit on Eagles quarterback Donovan McNabb, who suffered a bruised sternum on the play. (NFL.com)

== 14 September 2005 (Wednesday) ==
- Football (soccer): 2005–06 UEFA Champions League – Group stage – Matchday 1 (UEFA.com)
  - Group A: Club Brugge 1 – 2 Juventus
  - Group A: Rapid Vienna 0 – 1 Bayern Munich
  - Group B: Arsenal 2 – 1 FC Thun
  - Group B: Sparta Prague 1 – 1 Ajax
  - Group C: Udinese 3 – 0 Panathinaikos
  - Group C: Werder Bremen 0 – 2 Barcelona
  - Group D: Villarreal 0 – 0 Manchester United
  - Group D: Benfica 1 – 0 Lille
    - See also 2005–06 UEFA Champions League.
- Ice hockey: Canadian Governor General Adrienne Clarkson announces the creation of the Clarkson Cup, which seeks to be the women's equivalent of the Stanley Cup. No details, however, were announced as to how the trophy will be presented. (TSN)

== 13 September 2005 (Tuesday) ==
- Football (soccer): 2005–06 UEFA Champions League – Group stage – Matchday 1 (UEFA.com)
  - Group E: A.C. Milan 3–1 (1–0) Fenerbahçe
  - Group E: PSV 1–0 (1–0) Schalke 04
  - Group F: Lyon 3–0 (3–0) Real Madrid
  - Group F: Olympiakos 1–3 (1–1) Rosenborg
  - Group G: Chelsea 1–0 (1–0) Anderlecht
  - Group G: Real Betis 1–2 (0–2) Liverpool
  - Group H: Rangers 3–2 (1–0) Porto
  - Group H: Artmedia Bratislava 0–1 (0–1) Internazionale
    - See also 2005–06 UEFA Champions League.

== 12 September 2005 (Monday) ==
- Baseball: Barry Bonds went 1-for-4 with a ground rule double in his first game of the 2005 season as the San Francisco Giants beat the San Diego Padres by a 4–3 score at SBC Park.
- Cricket:
  - The 2005 Ashes: England draw the fifth and final Test in the series against Australia to secure a 2–1 victory in the series overall. Michael Vaughan thus becomes the first England captain to lead his team to an Ashes victory for 18 years. (Cricinfo)
- NFL:
  - The NFL will have the New Orleans Saints play four home games in Baton Rouge, Louisiana at Louisiana State University's Tiger Stadium on the school's main campus and three games at the Alamodome in San Antonio, Texas.
  - Monday Night Football:
    - Atlanta Falcons 14, Philadelphia Eagles 10: The Falcons got a measure of revenge in their NFC Championship Game rematch at the Georgia Dome. Eagles linebacker Jeremiah Trotter and Falcons cornerback Kevin Mathis were ejected before the game after getting into a fight. Another fight almost breaks out after the Falcons get upset with the Eagles for gathering on their Falcons logo at midfield. (Yahoo!) (NFL.com)
- Ice hockey: Mark Messier announces his retirement from the National Hockey League. The 25-year veteran is the only player to captain two different teams to Stanley Cups. His jersey number (11) will be retired by the New York Rangers. (TSN)

== 11 September 2005 (Sunday) ==
- Tennis: Roger Federer wins the US Open men's singles title with a 6–3, 2–6, 7–6(1), 6–1 victory over Andre Agassi. (Yahoo!/AP)
- Golf: The United States Solheim Cup team, captained by legend Nancy Lopez, wins the event at the Crooked Stick Golf Club in Carmel, Indiana, defeating Europe 15½ points to 12½ points. The U.S. has won all Solheim Cups contested on home soil. Meg Mallon sinks the Cup-clinching putt to defeat England's Karen Stupples in their singles match 3&1. In other news regarding the LPGA, outgoing commissioner Ty Votaw steps down after the event, to be succeeded by Carolyn Bivens. (LPGA.com)
- Auto racing:
  - IRL: Dan Wheldon wins his sixth race of the season, setting a new record for victories in an IRL season, also all but clinching the series title.
  - Formula One: Kimi Räikkönen wins the Belgian Grand Prix at Spa-Francorchamps, his sixth this year, tying him with Fernando Alonso for the most this season. The win means Alonso wait at least one more race before he can clinch the World Drivers' Championship with Alonso's lead 25 points. If the margin number stays between 20 and 30 after São Paulo two weeks from now, the title will be his. (Formula1.com)
- NFL Week 1:
  - New Orleans Saints 23, Carolina Panthers 20: A last-second field goal by John Carney wins it for the Hurricane Katrina displaced Saints at Bank of America Stadium in Charlotte, North Carolina. (Yahoo!/AP)
  - Dallas Cowboys 28, San Diego Chargers 24: Drew Bledsoe goes 18-for-24 with three touchdowns in his Cowboys debut, Keyshawn Johnson scores the go-ahaead touchdown with 3:10 remaining, and Aaron Glenn intercepts Chargers QB Drew Brees in the end zone with 30 seconds left. (Yahoo!/AP)
  - Kansas City Chiefs 27, New York Jets 7: The Chiefs force seven fumbles, two of which were recovered by the defense, in a rout of the Jets. (Yahoo!/AP)
  - Miami Dolphins 34, Denver Broncos 10: Nick Saban gets his first victory as an NFL head coach. (Yahoo!/AP)
  - Detroit Lions 17, Green Bay Packers 3: The Lions intercept Brett Favre twice and hold the Packers to 56 rushing yards. Packers wide receiver Javon Walker tears his right knee and will miss the rest of the season. (Yahoo!/AP)
  - Pittsburgh Steelers 34, Tennessee Titans 7: Rookie Willie Parker rushes for 161 yards and Ben Roethlisberger threw for two touchdowns. (Yahoo!/AP)
  - Buffalo Bills 22, Houston Texans 7: Bills quarterback J. P. Losman throws a touchdown pass to offensive tackle Jason Peters in his first NFL start. (Yahoo!/AP)
  - Tampa Bay Buccaneers 24, Minnesota Vikings 13: Rookie Alex Smith scored two touchdowns, "Cadillac" Williams ran 71 yards for a third, and the Bucs' defense intercepts Daunte Culpepper three times at the Metrodome. (Yahoo!/AP)
  - New York Giants 42, Arizona Cardinals 19: The Giants score five touchdowns in the second half, one of them on a 95-yard kickoff return by Willie Ponder. (Yahoo!/AP)
  - Cincinnati Bengals 27, Cleveland Browns 13: Carson Palmer throws for 280 yards and two touchdowns in spoiling new Browns head coach Romeo Crennel's debut. (Yahoo!/AP)
  - Jacksonville Jaguars 26, Seattle Seahawks 14: Matt Hasselbeck throws three interceptions as the Jaguars win their season opener. (Yahoo!/AP)
  - San Francisco 49ers 28, St. Louis Rams 25: The 49ers hold off a late comeback attempt to win Mike Nolan's head coaching debut. Rookie Otis Amey returns a punt for a touchdown. (Yahoo!/AP)
  - Washington Redskins 9, Chicago Bears 7: Running back Clinton Portis runs for 121 yards. (Yahoo!/AP)
  - Indianapolis Colts 24, Baltimore Ravens 7: Colts quarterback Peyton Manning was 21 for 35 for 254 yards and two touchdowns as the Colts spoiled the Ravens' season opener at M&T Bank Stadium.

== 10 September 2005 (Saturday) ==
- Auto racing: NASCAR Nextel Cup
  - Chevy Rock and Roll 400: Kurt Busch took the green flag and clinched a spot in the 2005 Chase for the NEXTEL Cup and proceeded to win the race in Richmond, Virginia. Four of his Roush Racing teammates — Matt Kenseth, Carl Edwards, Mark Martin and Greg Biffle — are all in the final ten-race playoff for the championship. The remaining five are Ryan Newman, Jimmie Johnson, Tony Stewart, Jeremy Mayfield and Rusty Wallace. Jamie McMurray, who entered the race one point ahead of Newman in the final spot, crashed in an incident with Mike Garvey after they accidentally wrecked Ricky Rudd during Lap 362. Both Elliott Sadler and Jeff Gordon, who participated in the inaugural chase last year, missed the chase this year, as did arguably the circuit's most popular driver, Dale Earnhardt Jr. (NASCAR.com)
- Baseball: The San Francisco Giants announce that star outfielder Barry Bonds will play his first game of the season on September 12 against the San Diego Padres after recuperating from operations on his right knee over the winter. (Yahoo!/AP)
- College football:
  - Charlie Weis becomes the first Notre Dame head coach to begin his career with back-to-back wins on the road since Knute Rockne in 1918, with a 17–10 win over #3-ranked Michigan in Ann Arbor. (Yahoo!/AP)
  - In the first meeting ever between the two teams, #2 Texas, inspired by some 4th-quarter heroics from Heisman Trophy candidate Vince Young, beat #4 Ohio State 25–22 before an estimated crowd of 110,000 at Ohio Stadium in Columbus.
- Tennis: At the US Open, Kim Clijsters defeats Mary Pierce 6–3, 6–1 in the women's singles final to capture her first Grand Slam title. (Yahoo!/AP)

== 8 September 2005 (Thursday) ==
- NFL: 2005 Kickoff Game
  - New England Patriots 30, Oakland Raiders 20: Tom Brady threw for 306 yards and a pair of touchdowns, and Corey Dillon added two touchdown runs in the win for the defending champs. Randy Moss made his Raiders' debut special with a 73-yard touchdown reception from Kerry Collins, who threw for two more TDs in the loss. (ESPN)

== 7 September 2005 (Wednesday) ==
- 2006 FIFA World Cup Qualifying Matches (FIFAWorldCup.com)
  - Europe
    - Netherlands 4–0 (3–0) Andorra
    - Denmark 6–1 (3–1) Georgia
    - Lithuania 0–1 (0–0) Bosnia-Herzegovina
    - Belgium 8–0 (3–0) San Marino
    - Belarus 1–4 (1–3) Italy
    - Hungary 0–1 (0–0) Sweden
    - Moldova 1–2 (1–0) Slovenia
    - Spain 1–1 (1–0) Serbia and Montenegro
    - Cyprus 1–3 (1–1) Switzerland
    - Azerbaijan 0–0 Austria
    - Republic of Ireland 0–1 (0–0) France
    - Poland 1–0 (0–0) Wales
    - Liechtenstein 3–0 (1–0) Luxembourg
    - Kazakhstan 1–2 (0–0) Greece
    - Malta 1–1 (0–1) Croatia 103 Croatian fans were arrested for rioting after the shock result.
    - Faroe Islands 0–2 (0–0) Israel
    - Czech Republic 4–1 (0–0) Armenia
    - Norway 1–2 (0–2) Scotland
    - Latvia 1–1 (0–1) Slovakia
    - Ukraine 0–1 (0–0) Turkey
    - Finland 5–1 (3–0) Macedonia
    - Russia 0–0 Portugal
    - Bulgaria 3–2 (1–2) Iceland
    - Northern Ireland 1–0 (0–0) England Northern Ireland's first victory over England since 1972, and their first at home since 1927.
  - CONCACAF
    - Costa Rica 2–0 (1–0) Trinidad and Tobago
    - Mexico 5–0 (1–0) Panama Mexico secures their World Cup place.
    - Guatemala 0–0 USA
- NHL: The San Jose Sharks' Vincent Damphousse retires after 18 years in the league. (Yahoo!)

== 6 September 2005 (Tuesday) ==
- 2006 FIFA World Cup Qualifying Matches (FIFAWorldCup.com)
  - Oceania
    - Solomon Islands 1–2 (0–1) Australia Australia, after winning 9–1 on aggregate, advances to play the 5th placed team in the South American qualification group for a place in the Finals in Germany next June.
  - Asia: FIFA annul the result of last Saturday's play-off match between Uzbekistan and Bahrain because of an error by referee Toshimitsu Yoshida, when an Uzbekistan penalty was disallowed and Bahrain was awarded a free kick. The tie will be replayed on 8 October with the leg in Bahrain on 12 October. (BBC)
- Cricket: Videocon Tri-Series final: New Zealand (278 for 4, Astle 115*, Fleming 61; Sehwag 3–44) beat India (276, Kaif 93*, Sehwag 75; Oram 4–58) by six wickets to win the Videocon Tri-Series. This was India's fifth successive final loss. (Cricinfo)
- NHL: New Jersey Devils defenseman and captain Scott Stevens retires after 22 years in the league. Stevens played on all three of the Devils' Stanley Cup-winning teams to date, and he played more games than any defenseman ever. (Yahoo!)

== 5 September 2005 (Monday) ==
- NFL: Jerry Rice announces his retirement from football. The 42-year-old declined a role with the Denver Broncos as only a fourth wide receiver. Rice retires holding most of the NFL's career records in receiving. (ESPN)
- PGA Tour: Olin Browne wins the Deutsche Bank Championship in Norton, Massachusetts with a final score of 14-under. It's Browne's first win on Tour since the 1999 Bank of America Colonial. (PGATour.com)
- Canadian football: Canadian Football League Labour Day Classic (Week 11):
  - A successful field goal by Hamilton kicker Jamie Boreham with two minutes remaining in the fourth quarter gives the Tiger-Cats victory over the Toronto Argonauts, 33–30. It is only Hamilton's second win of the season. TSN
  - The Edmonton Eskimos manage to build a 20–1 lead at the half, but had to hang on to win 25–23 over the Calgary Stampeders. TSN

== 4 September 2005 (Sunday) ==
- Canadian football: Canadian Football League Labour Day Classic (Week 11) – Despite Winnipeg's Milt Stegall breaking the CFL's all-time record for touchdown receptions that was formerly held by Allen Pitts, the Blue Bombers lose to the Saskatchewan Roughriders 45–26 in the traditional Sunday matchup. (TSN)
- Auto racing:
  - NASCAR: Kyle Busch becomes the youngest driver to win a NASCAR Nextel Cup race, at 20 years, 4 months and 2 days, winning the Sony HD 500 at California Speedway. (ESPN)
  - Formula One: Juan Pablo Montoya wins the Italian Grand Prix at the Autodromo Nazionale di Monza. The McLaren–Mercedes driver finished 2.479 and 17.9 seconds ahead of Renault drivers Fernando Alonso and Giancarlo Fisichella, respectively. Kimi Räikkönen who started 11th finished fourth. It was the first full-field race since 1961 in which no car retired due to mechanical failure. (Formula1.com) (Sky TV)
- 2006 FIFA World Cup Qualifying Matches (FIFAWorldCup.com)
  - Africa
    - Guinea 3–1 Malawi
    - Egypt 4–1 Benin
    - Algeria 2–5 Nigeria
    - Angola 3–0 Gabon
    - Ghana 2–0 Uganda
    - Zimbabwe 3–1 Rwanda
    - Ivory Coast 2–3 Cameroon
    - Togo 3–0 Liberia
    - Congo DR 2–1 Cape Verde
  - South America
    - Uruguay 3–2 Colombia
    - Brazil 5–0 Chile Brazil qualifies for the Finals.

== 3 September 2005 (Saturday) ==
- 2006 FIFA World Cup Qualifying Matches (FIFAWorldCup.com)
  - Africa
    - Zambia 0–1 Senegal
    - Morocco 1–0 Botswana
    - Mali 2–0 Congo
    - Kenya 0–2 Tunisia
    - Burkina Faso 3–1 South Africa
  - Asia
    - Uzbekistan 1–0 Bahrain
  - Europe
    - Romania 2–0 (1–0) Czech Republic
    - Armenia 0–1 (0–0) Netherlands
    - Andorra 0–0 Finland
    - Albania 2–1 (0–0) Kazakhstan
    - Turkey 2–2 (0–1) Denmark
    - Georgia 1–1 (0–1) Ukraine Ukraine assured its place as a World Cup qualifier.
    - Russia 2–0 (1–0) Liechtenstein
    - Portugal 6–0 (3–0) Luxembourg
    - Estonia 2–1 (1–0) Latvia
    - France 3–0 (2–0) Faroe Islands
    - Switzerland 1–1 (0–0) Israel
    - Scotland 1–1 (1–0) Italy
    - Slovenia 2–3 (1–2) Norway Morten Gamst Pedersen scored the winning goal in the 92nd minute, lobbing over the Slovenian keeper after the hosts had equalised 10 minutes earlier
    - Moldova 2–0 (1–0) Belarus
    - Wales 0–1 (0–0) England
    - Poland 3–2 (2–0) Austria
    - Northern Ireland 2–0 (0–0) Azerbaijan
    - Serbia and Montenegro 2–0 (1–0) Lithuania
    - Bosnia-Herzegovina 1–0 (0–0) Belgium
    - Hungary 4–0 (1–0) Malta
    - Iceland 1–3 (1–0) Croatia
    - Sweden 3–0 (0–0) Bulgaria
  - CONCACAF
    - USA 2–0 (0–0) Mexico The USA becomes the first CONCACAF team to assure its World Cup place.
    - Panama 1–3 (0–1) Costa Rica
    - Trinidad and Tobago 3–2 (0–1) Guatemala
  - Oceania
    - Australia 7–0 Solomon Islands
  - South America
    - Venezuela 4–1 Peru
    - Bolivia 1–2 Ecuador
    - Paraguay 1–0 Argentina
- Auto racing:
  - Formula One: Although Kimi Räikkönen was the fastest during the qualifying session of the 2005 Italian Grand Prix Juan Pablo Montoya tomorrow will start in the pole position ahead of Fernando Alonso and Jenson Button since the Finn pilot did have an engine change after the practice session. (Formula1.com)
- Rugby union: The New Zealand All Blacks defeat Australia's Wallabies 34–24 in the final match of the 2005 Tri Nations Series, and win the title for the sixth time. (SMH)
- Rowing: The New Zealand team wins four gold medals in the five events they entered in the World Rowing Championships in Gifu, Japan. (TVNZ)

== 2 September 2005 (Friday) ==
- 2006 FIFA World Cup Qualifying Matches (FIFAWorldCup.com)
  - Africa
    - Libya 0–0 Sudan
- Canadian football: Canadian Football League, Week 11: The Montreal Alouettes defeat the Ottawa Renegades 41–18 in the first game of the Labour Day matchups. TSN
- Australian rules football: 2005 AFL finals series (Australia)
  - West Coast Eagles 10.9 69 Sydney Swans 10.5 65
- Cricket:
  - Videocon Tri-Series India (279 for 4, Kaif 102*) beat New Zealand (278 for 9, Styris 56) by six wickets. (Cricinfo)
  - Bangladesh tour of Sri Lanka, 2nd ODI: Sri Lanka (295 for 5, Tharanga 105, Atapattu 53) beat Bangladesh (220 for 6, Shahriar Nafees 51; Dilshan 3–15) (Cricinfo)
  - Intercontinental Cup: Canada (340 for 9 declared & 151 for 6 declared) beat Cayman Islands (159 & 212) by 120 runs. However, the win is not big enough to see Canada into the semi-finals, as Bermuda qualify from the Americas. (Cricinfo)

== 1 September 2005 (Thursday) ==
- Basketball: The San Antonio Spurs sign Michael Finley.
