= 2005 Chase for the Nextel Cup =

NASCAR playoff series

The 2005 Chase for the Nextel Cup served as the ten-race playoff series among the top ten drivers in the 2005 NASCAR Nextel Cup Series. After the Chevy Rock and Roll 400 on September 10, 2005, the ten drivers atop the standings were locked into the playoff, with the participants as follows: (Note: Some NASCAR multiple car teams have owners other than the official listed owner. In the past, NASCAR limited one car owner to two teams, and teams found ways around it by having personnel other than the owner register the car in their name, such as employees and family members of car owners. That, plus Roush Racing having five of the ten cars in the 2005 Chase, has resulted in a NASCAR rule change limiting teams to four cars in 2006.) (Note: The most points that can be gained by a driver in a race is 156.)

1. Tony Stewart - Joe Gibbs Racing #20 (Joe Gibbs) — 5,050 points
2. Greg Biffle — Roush Racing #16 (Geoff Smith (Note: Geoff Smith, the official owner of the #16, is the president of Roush Racing.)) -5 points
3. Rusty Wallace — Penske Racing #2 (Roger Penske) -10 points
4. Jimmie Johnson — Hendrick Motorsports #48 (Jeff Gordon (Note: Jeff Gordon is the official owner of the #48, through his work in signing Johnson to Hendrick Motorsports, licensing of merchandising through Hendrick Gordon Licensing LLC, and holds minority interest in the team.)) -15 points
5. Kurt Busch — Roush Racing #97 (Georgetta Roush (Note: Georgetta Roush is Jack's mother, and the official owner of the #97.)) -20 points
6. Mark Martin — Roush Racing #6 (Jack Roush) -25 points
7. Jeremy Mayfield — Evernham Motorsports #19 (Ray Evernham) -30 points
8. Carl Edwards — Roush Racing #99 (Jack Roush) -35 points
9. Matt Kenseth — Roush Racing #17 (Mark Martin (Note: Mark Martin is the official owner of the #17 because of his work in signing Kenseth, and holds minority interest in that team.)) -35 points
10. Ryan Newman — Penske Racing #12 (Roger Penske) -45 points

== Sylvania 300 Running Order among Chase Drivers ==
Actual finish in parentheses:

1. Ryan Newman (1)
2. Tony Stewart (2)
3. Matt Kenseth (3)
4. Greg Biffle (5)
5. Rusty Wallace (6)
6. Mark Martin (7)
7. Jimmie Johnson (8)
8. Jeremy Mayfield (16)
9. Carl Edwards (19)
10. Kurt Busch (35)

Standings after race one:

1. Stewart 5,230 pts (leader)
2. Biffle -20 pts (unchanged)
3. Newman -40 pts (+7 places)×
4. Wallace -40 pts (-1 place)
5. Kenseth -50 pts (+4 places)
6. Johnson -53 pts (-3 places)
7. Martin -54 pts (-2 places)
8. Mayfield -95 pts (- 1 place)
9. Edwards -109 pts (-1 place)
10. Kurt Busch -142 pts (-5 places)

×-Holds tiebreaker with one win.

== MBNA RacePoints 400 Running Order among Chase Drivers ==
Actual finish in parentheses:

1. Jimmie Johnson (1)
2. Rusty Wallace (3)
3. Mark Martin (4)
4. Ryan Newman (5)
5. Jeremy Mayfield (7)
6. Carl Edwards (9)
7. Greg BIffle (13)
8. Tony Stewart (18)
9. Kurt Busch (23)
10. Matt Kenseth (35)

Standings after two races:

1. Johnson 5362 pts (+5 places)
2. R. Wallace -7 pts (+2 places)
3. Newman -12 pts (unchanged)
4. Martin -21 pts (+2 places)
5. Stewart -23 pts (-4 places)×
6. Biffle -23 pts (-3 places)
7. Mayfield -81 pts (+1 place)
8. Edwards -103 pts (+1 place)
9. Kenseth -124 pts (-4 places)
10. Kurt Busch -170 pts (unchanged)

×—Holds tiebreaker with more wins (5).

== UAW-Ford 500 Running Order among Chase Drivers ==
Actual finish in parentheses: (Note: Some media outlets reported that Newman was the new point leader by one point over Stewart after the race. NASCAR scoring freezes immediately upon a caution being signaled, and a caution was signaled on Lap 190 of 188 (the race was extended because of a late-race caution) midway through the lap after a crash. Under NASCAR rules for late-race situations, video of the race is used with the AMB timing system intermediates to determine final placings. Stewart was ahead of Newman by two places when the caution light was signaled.)

1. Tony Stewart (2)
2. Matt Kenseth (3)
3. Ryan Newman (4)
4. Carl Edwards (5)
5. Kurt Busch (8)
6. Jeremy Mayfield (12)
7. Rusty Wallace (25)
8. Greg Biffle (27)
9. Jimmie Johnson (31)
10. Mark Martin (41)

Standings after three races:

1. Stewart 5,515 pts (+4 places)
2. Newman -4 pts (+1)
3. R. Wallace -76 pts (-1)
4. Johnson -82 pts (-3)
5. Biffle -98 pts (+1)
6. Edwards -100 pts (-2)
7. Kenseth -111 pts (+2)
8. Mayfield -112 pts (-1)
9. Martin -138 (-5)
10. Kurt Busch -180 (unchanged)

== Banquet 400 Running Order among Chase Drivers ==
Actual finish in parentheses:

1. Mark Martin (1)
2. Greg Biffle (2)
3. Carl Edwards (3)
4. Tony Stewart (4)
5. Matt Kenseth (5)
6. Jimmie Johnson (6)
7. Rusty Wallace (7)
8. Kurt Busch (14)
9. Jeremy Mayfield (16)
10. Ryan Newman (23)

Standings after four races:

1. Stewart 5,684 pts (unchanged)
2. Newman -75 pts (unchanged)
3. Biffle -88 pts (+2 places)
4. R. Wallace -90 pts (-1)
5. Johnson -92 pts (-1)
6. Edwards -95 pts (unchanged)
7. Martin -113 pts (+2)
8. Kenseth -116 pts (-1)
9. Mayfield -157 pts (-1)
10. Kurt Busch -224 pts (unchanged)

== UAW-GM Quality 500 Running Order among Chase Drivers ==
Actual finish in parentheses:

1. Jimmie Johnson (1)
2. Kurt Busch (2)
3. Greg Biffle (3)
4. Mark Martin (5)
5. Ryan Newman (7)
6. Carl Edwards (10)
7. Jeremy Mayfield (11)
8. Rusty Wallace (24)
9. Tony Stewart (25)
10. Matt Kenseth (26)

Standings after five races:

1. Stewart 5,777 Points (unchanged)×
2. Johnson tied (+ 3 places)
3. Biffle -11 pts (unchanged)
4. Newman -17 pts (- 2)
5. Martin -51 pts (+2)
6. Edwards -54 pts (unchanged)
7. R. Wallace -92 pts (-3)
8. Mayfield -115 pts (+1)
9. Kenseth -124 pts (-1)
10. Kurt Busch -142 pts (unchanged)

× — Holds tiebreaker with more wins (5).

== Subway 500 Running Order among Chase Drivers ==
Actual finish in parentheses:

1. Tony Stewart (2)
2. Jimmie Johnson (3)
3. Kurt Busch (6)
4. Ryan Newman (10)
5. Matt Kenseth (12)
6. Rusty Wallace (19)
7. Greg Biffle (20)
8. Carl Edwards (26)
9. Jeremy Mayfield (28)
10. Mark Martin (34)

Standings after six races:

1. Stewart 5,957 pts (unchanged)
2. Johnson -15 pts (unchanged)
3. Newman - 63 pts (+1 place)
4. Biffle - 83 pts (-1)
5. Edwards -149 pts (+1)
6. R. Wallace -166 pts (+1)
7. Martin -170 pts (-2)
8. Kurt Busch -172 pts (+2)×
9. Kenseth -172 pts (unchanged)
10. Mayfield -216 pts (-2)

×—Holds tiebreaker with more wins (3).

== Bass Pro Shops MBNA Running Order among Chase Drivers ==
Actual finish in parentheses: (Note: Some media outlets said R. Wallace, Kurt Busch, and Mayfield were mathematically eliminated from the championship. That is not true. The most points a driver can make up in a race is 156 points, and in theory, all three drivers would have to have big points days when the leaders falter. However, no driver can be eliminated officially until a driver is behind the leader by 156 points multiplied by the number of races remaining. A driver is still in contention as long as the difference between the leader and such driver is no greater than 156 points (the difference between first and 43rd) multiplied by the number of races remaining, provided said drivers start all remaining races.)

1. Carl Edwards (1)
2. Mark Martin (3)
3. Matt Kenseth (5)
4. Greg Biffle (7)
5. Tont Stewart (9)
6. Jimmie Johnson (16)
7. Ryan Newman (23)
8. Kurt Busch (36)
9. Rusty Wallace (37)
10. Jeremy Mayfield (38)

Standings with three races to go:

1. Stewart 6,100 pts (unchanged)
2. Johnson -43 pts (unchanged)
3. Biffle -75 pts (+1 place)
4. Edwards -107 pts (+1)×
5. Newman -107 pts (-2)
6. Martin -143 pts (+1)
7. Kenseth -155 pts (+2)
8. R. Wallace -257 pts (-2)
9. Kurt Busch -260 pts (-1)
10. Mayfield -310 pts (unchanged)

×—Owns tiebreaker with more wins (3).

== Dickies 500 Running Order among Chase Drivers ==
Actual finish in parentheses:

1. Carl Edwards (1)
2. Mark Martin (2)
3. Matt Kenseth (3)
4. Jimmie Johnson (5)
5. Tony Stewart (6)
6. Kurt Busch (10)
7. Greg Biffle (20)
8. Rusty Wallace (22)
9. Ryan Newman (25)
10. Jeremy Mayfield (35)

Standings with two races to go:

1. Stewart 6,250 pts (unchanged)
2. Johnson -35 pts (unchanged)
3. Edwards -77 pts (+1 position)
4. Biffle -122 pts (-1)
5. Martin -123 pts (+1)
6. Kenseth -140 pts (+1)
7. Newman -169 pts (-2)
8. Kurt Busch -276 pts (+1)
9. R. Wallace -310 pts (-1)
10. Mayfield -402 pts (unchanged)§

§ — Mathematically eliminated from the chase.

== Checker Auto Parts 500 Running Order among Chase Drivers ==
On Sunday, November 13, Roush Racing suspended Kurt Busch prior to the running of the Checker Auto Parts 500 race at Phoenix International Raceway after being arrested for charges against him of reckless driving off the track. By NASCAR rules, the team remains in the Chase, although for the Owner's Championship only for teams. (Note: Kenny Wallace, who was replacing Kurt Busch because of his suspension by Roush Racing because of his arrest for reckless driving, will earn owners' points for the #97. By NASCAR rules, owner points are calculated as part of the Chase. K. Wallace finished 16th.)

Actual finish in parentheses (Drivers only):

1. Greg Biffle (2)
2. Tony Stewart (4)
3. Carl Edwards (6)
4. Jimmie Johnson (7)
5. Ryan Newman (12)
6. Mark Martin (14)
7. Jeremy Mayfield (19)
8. Rusty Wallace (29)
9. Matt Kenseth (32)

Standings with only the Ford 400 remaining (Drivers only):

1. Stewart 6,255 pts (unchanged)
2. Johnson -52 pts (unchanged)
3. Edwards -87 pts (unchanged)
4. Biffle -102 pts (unchanged)
5. Martin -162 pts (unchanged)§
6. Newman -207 pts (+1 position)§
7. Kenseth -288 pts (-1 position driver)§
8. R. Wallace -395 pts (+1 position driver)§
9. Kurt Busch -441 pts (-1 position)≈§
10. Mayfield -476 pts (unchanged)§

§ — Mathematically eliminated from championship competition (Being 190 points or back from the leader - 156 points once the final race starts).

≈ — Kurt Busch was suspended for the final two races by Roush Racing after his arrest because of reckless driving charges.

== Ford 400 Running Order among Chase Drivers ==
Jimmie Johnson was eliminated on Lap 127 when a tire blew and he crashed into Turn Three at Homestead-Miami Speedway, Carl Edwards led the most laps, and Greg Biffle won the race by .017 seconds over teammate Mark Martin leading a top four Roush Racing sweep, the team's third podium sweep (top three) in eleven races, but when Tony Stewart crossed the finish line in 15th place, he clinched the 2005 NEXTEL Cup championship.

Actual finish in parentheses (Drivers only):

1. Greg Biffle (1)
2. Mark Martin (2)
3. Matt Kenseth (3)
4. Carl Edwards (4)
5. Ryan Newman (7)
6. Jeremy Mayfield (10)
7. Rusty Wallace (13)
8. Tony Stewart (15)
9. Jimmie Johnson (40)

Kenny Wallace, driving for suspended driver Kurt Busch, finished 21st, and the #97 team finished eighth in owner points, 336 points behind the #20.

Final standings (Drivers only) - NASCAR Awards:

1. Tony Stewart 6,533 Points (Champion) - $6,173,633
2. Greg Biffle -35 points (Note: Biffle finishes second because he had more wins (six) than Edwards (four).) (+2 Places) - $2,624,124
3. Carl Edwards -35 points (Unchanged) - $2,003,164
4. Mark Martin -105 points (+1 Place) - $1,727,115
5. Jimmie Johnson -127 points (-3 Places) - $1,700,048
6. Ryan Newman -174 points (Unchanged) - $1,381,404
7. Matt Kenseth -181 points (Unchanged) - $1,243,360
8. Rusty Wallace -353 points (Note: Because of Kurt Busch's suspension from the final two races of 2005, and the #97 team's overall eight-place owner points position, the payouts for 8th, 9th, and 10th places are different. Rusty Wallace, who finished 8th in driver points, will receive 8th place awards from Sprint Nextel, and the NASCAR Driver Points Fund award, but the 9th place NASCAR Owner Points Fund award.) (Unchanged) - $1,201,850
9. Jeremy Mayfield -460 points (Note: Jeremy Mayfield, who finished 9th in driver points, receives the 9th place Nextel Cup and NASCAR Driver Points awards, and the 10th place NASCAR Owner Points awards.) (+1 Place) - $1,174,177
10. Kurt Busch -535 points (-304 #97 team overall) (Note: Kurt Busch, who finished 10th after the suspension, receives the 10th place Nextel Cup and NASCAR Driver Points awards, and 17/18ths of the #97 team's 8th-place position in the NASCAR Owner Points Fund.) (-1 Place) - $1,151,543

52. Kenny Wallace -6,157 points (-304 #97 team overall) (Note: Kenny Wallace drove the #97 car for the last two races, receiving a 1/18ths share (2 of 36 races) of the team's 8th place NASCAR Owner Points fund for the two races he drove.) - $36,471

Nextel Cup Top Ten bonus monies do not include a share of the Nextel Cup Leader Bonus left unclaimed at the end of 2005.

== Sources ==
- "Scoreboard". TimesDaily. Vol. 16, no. 289. October 16, 2005. p. 2C – via Google Books.
- Fryer, Jenna (November 19, 2005). "Roush gets final word". Spartanburg Herald-Journal. Associated Press. p. C7 – via Google Books.
- Hood, Jeff (September 23, 2005). "Busch runs red-hot after costly mishap". Kentucky New Era. Vol. 118, no. 255. Cox News Service. p. B5 – via Google Books.
- James, Brant (November 21, 2005). "Stewart's smooth ride". St. Petersburg Times. pp. 1C, 3C – via Google Books.
- McConnell, Jim (January 25, 2006). "Changes coming for Yates". The Free Lance–Star. Vol. 122, no. 25. pp. B1, B5 – via Google Books.
- Whipple, Phil (September 17, 2005). "For Craven, track's like coming home again". Sun Journal. pp. C1, C7 – via Google Books.

| Preceded by 2004 Chase for the Nextel Cup | NASCAR seasons 2005 | Succeeded by 2006 Chase for the Nextel Cup |
